= History of Shinto =

Shinto is a religion native to Japan with a centuries'-long history tied to various influences in origin.

Although historians debate the point at which it is suitable to begin referring to Shinto as a distinct religion, kami veneration has been traced back to Japan's Yayoi period (300 BCE to CE 300). Buddhism entered Japan at the end of the Kofun period (CE 300 to 538) and spread rapidly. Religious syncretization made kami worship and Buddhism functionally inseparable, a process called shinbutsu-shūgō. The kami came to be viewed as part of Buddhist cosmology and were increasingly depicted anthropomorphically. The earliest written tradition regarding kami worship was recorded in the 8th-century Kojiki and Nihon Shoki. In ensuing centuries, shinbutsu-shūgō was adopted by Japan's Imperial household. During the Meiji era (1868 to 1912), Japan's nationalist leadership expelled Buddhist influence from kami worship and formed State Shinto, which some historians regard as the origin of Shinto as a distinct religion. Shrines came under growing government influence and citizens were encouraged to worship the emperor as a kami. With the formation of the Japanese Empire in the early 20th century, Shinto was exported to other areas of East Asia. Following Japan's defeat in World War II, Shinto was formally separated from the state.

Even among experts, there is no definitive agreement on what Shinto is, what it encompasses, or even where the history of Shinto begins. Shinto scholar Shōji Okada argues the bedrock of Shinto was laid between the Yayoi period and the Kofun period but also lays out four possible points in history when organized Shinto came into being as a religion. These are as follows (with the primary scholar supporting that theory in parentheses):

1. In the 7th century with the formation of Ritsuryō system (Shōji Okada)
2. In the 8th and 9th centuries when the Imperial court developed an awareness of Shinto (Masao Takatori)
3. In the 11th and 12th centuries when an awareness of Shinto spread throughout the various regions of Japan (Hiroshi Inoue)
4. In the 15th century with the emergence of Yoshida Shinto (Toshio Kuroda)

== Overview ==
While there is no agreed-upon argument for when Shinto began as a religion, its foundations can be seen in ancient times. It begins with the development of nature worship on the Japanese archipelago which saw nature as one with kami, a belief that developed along with the introduction of rice production in the Jomon and Yayoi periods. This faith was spread across the archipelago through state rituals conducted by the Yamato Kingship in the Kofun period. Rituals were held at early shrines such as Munakata Taisha and Ōmiwa Shrine, forming a template for future Shinto. Upon entering the Asuka period, the establishment of the Ritsuryō system led to a systemization of rituals, shrines, and ceremonies and the creation of the Department of Divinities which oversaw Ritsuyō rituals. Tang dynasty codes were used as reference for the regulations regarding the management and administration of rituals in this system. As the Nara period began, Japanese myths and history were compiled in the Kojiki and Nihon Shoki, linking the imperial family to these rituals. As the Ritsuryō system was relaxed in the Heian period, the emperor and his attendants became directly involved in the rituals of regional shrines without going through the Department of Divinities. Buddhism then began to fuse with this faith in kami that had originated in ancient times in a process called shinbutsu-shūgō, but it is also possible to see the opposite, a shinbutsu-bunri mindset, with a clear division being placed between Shinto rituals and Buddhism. The Shugendō and Onmyōdō faiths also developed in this period and had an influence on Shinto.

In the Middle Ages, there was a movement to create doctrine for Shinto and make it a societal norm among the people. In the Kamakura period, the Kamakura shogunate's worship of kami resulted in protections for shrines throughout the regions of Japan and the widespread worship of kami such as Kumano Gongen, Hachiman, Inari Ōkami, Amaterasu, and Tenjin beyond the limited regions in which they had seen significant worship by the common people in ancient times. As this form of Shinto spread, the intelligentsia began experimenting with interpreting Shinto through Buddhist philosophy, a movement which began with Ryōbu Shintō established by mikkyō monks, and supported the honji suijaku theory which claimed the kami were manifestations of Buddhas. As shrines began to feel threatened by this, they responded by creating systemized theories such as a version of the honji suijaku theory which placed kami in a superior position in relation to the Buddhas with a foundation in a background belief of Japan as a divine land following Japan's victory against the Mongol invaders. They also created Ise Shinto based on the Shintō Gōbusho (神道五部書; "Five Shinto Scriptures"). Later, when many ancient texts were lost in the Ōnin War during the Muromachi period, the opportunity allowed Yoshida Kanetomo to create false documents which he used to establish Yoshida Shinto, the first Shinto theory that was independent from Buddhism but had its own unique doctrine, texts, and rituals. Yoshida Shinto quickly rose to prominence, helped by the societal instability of this period of war, resulting in widespread adoption among the upper class which made it the core form of Shinto at the time. Yoshida Shinto was also involved with the establishment of shrines dedicated to Sengoku Daimyō from the Sengoku period to the Azuchi–Momoyama period.

Japan's modern era primarily consists of the Edo period. During this period, the Tokugawa shogunate reformed the administration of shrines, and the improved societal stability and transportation infrastructure of the time led to increased religious activity among the common people in the form of pilgrimages to Ise Shrine and people-led festivals. In contrast, Buddhism, which had previously enjoyed a position as the state religion, had entered a period of philosophical stagnation. As this was happening, mainstream Shinto philosophies of the early Edo period become more closely linked with the Cheng-Zhu school of Neo-Confucianism as they became critical of Buddhism, leading to a shift from Buddhist Shinto to Confucian Shinto such as Suika Shinto. In the mid Edo period, there came a development of the academic field of kokugaku which integrated Shinto into the empirical study of Japanese classics, such as the study of poetry and linguistics. Kokugaku engaged with Confucian Shinto and flourished in this period. Kokugaku scholar Motoori Norinaga strongly criticized the practice of interpreting Shinto through Buddhism or Confucianism, which had been transmitted from China, and was a proponent for the empirical research of Shinto texts. In the late Edo period, Hirata Atsutane's Fukko Shinto adopted these religious studies of Motoori, though modified some aspects. Fukko Shinto placed a strong emphasis on the afterlife after being influenced by Christianity and also claimed all the myths of the world, from China, India, and in Christianity, were variations on Japanese myth. It then became involved in the restoration of imperial rule. However, Motoori's arguments faced criticism in the Mito Domain for rejecting Confucianism. In this region, scholars fused kokugaku with the Confucian ethics of loyalty and filial piety to create late Mitogaku. By connecting Confucianism and Shinto, Late Mitogaku advocated for the imperial rule of Japan, becoming fertile grounds for the development of shishi philosophies of the final years of the Edo period.

After the shogunate fell and Japan entered the modern era, the Decree for the Restoration of Imperial Rule tied Shinto to government in a move by the new government to unify ritual and rule. The Taikyo Proclamation led to the spread of Shinto proselytization, while the Shinbutsu Hanzen-rei (神仏判然令; "Order for Distinguishing Shinto and Buddhism") aimed to separate Shinto and Buddhism, resulting in an extreme form of haibutsu kishaku in which many Buddhist temples and statues were destroyed. The Meiji government then formed a system for State Shinto, where the state administrated over shrines with the stance that the rituals of Shinto were state rituals. Afterwards, the faction supporting the union of government and religion were ousted by those seeking a separation of church and state. This resulted in Shinto being defined as non-religious and the creation of Secular Shrine Theory which provided shines with status as government organizations, and regional shrines were cut off from government funding. In response, the Shinto priesthood formed the National Association of Shinto Priests and began a movement to reinstate the Department of Divinities in order to receive public funds. Members of the Shinto priesthood who opposed the government as well as Shinto philosophers criticized the State Shinto system for defining Shinto as non-religious and for eliminating the teaching of Shinto philosophy, and private Shinto organizations were established in the form of the thirteen sects of Sect Shinto. After the end of World War II, the Supreme Commander for the Allied Powers (SCAP) issued the Religious Corporations Order which identified State Shinto as a source of nationalistic ideology and changed shrines into religious corporations under the umbrella of the Association of Shinto Shrines. Shrines lost their status as government organizations, but gained the freedom to conduct religious activities, allowing some shrines to achieve a financial prosperity previously unattainable. Now, shrines play a steady role in annual events and ceremonies for life events.

== Ancient times ==
=== Pre-Ritsuryō Rituals ===
As rice cultivation spread through the Japanese archipelago from the late Jomon into the Yayoi period, a type of nature worship based on the cultivation of rice also arose. This belief was based on the idea that nature and the kami were one, and that sacrifices and rituals prevented the kami from ravishing the land in the form of natural disasters.

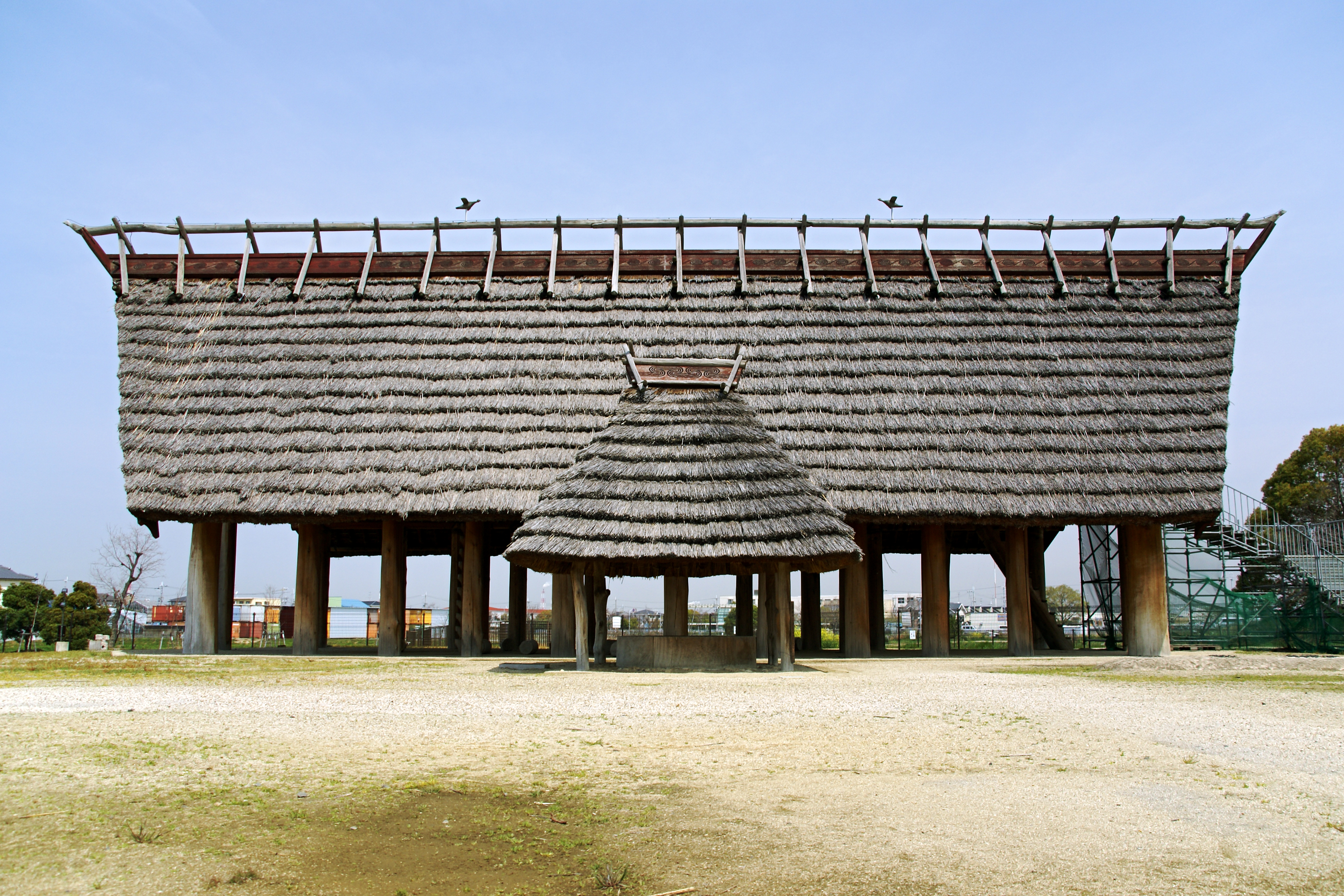
High Hall at the Ikegami-Sone Site, a Yayoi period site that shares architectural features with shrines.

In the Yayoi period, several Shinto practices appeared that had clear similarities to those seen in the Kojiki and Nihon Shoki. Archeological finds supporting this include finds believed to be in a similar vein as shrines, such as a new style of square-shaped burial mounds (方形周溝墓, hōkei shūkōbo), bronze ritualistic items from archeological sites including the Kōjindani Site, and large buildings with freestanding roof pillars (独立棟持柱, dokuritsu munamochi-bashira), an architectural feature in common with later shrines, an example of which is seen at the Ikegami-Sone Site. Charred bones of deer and other animals used for divination have also been found in the vicinity of such sites, as well as grave goods such as mirrors, swords, and beads.

Around the 3rd century, what would become the Makimuku ruins began to develop in the Yamato Province near Mount Miwa, and early, large-scale zenpokoenfun began to emerge as well, such as the Hashihaka kofun. It is believed the Yamato Kingship was established in this period. The 3rd century is also the estimated time of creation of the triangular-rimmed shinjūkyō passed down by the Kagami-tsukurinimasu Amateru-mitama Jinja (鏡作坐天照御魂神社) shrine as well as the iron sword excavated at Isonokami Shrine. These objects resemble the holy sword and mirror described in the Kojiki and Nihon Shiki, and allowed for a clearer understanding of elements that would lead to the Shinto faith later.

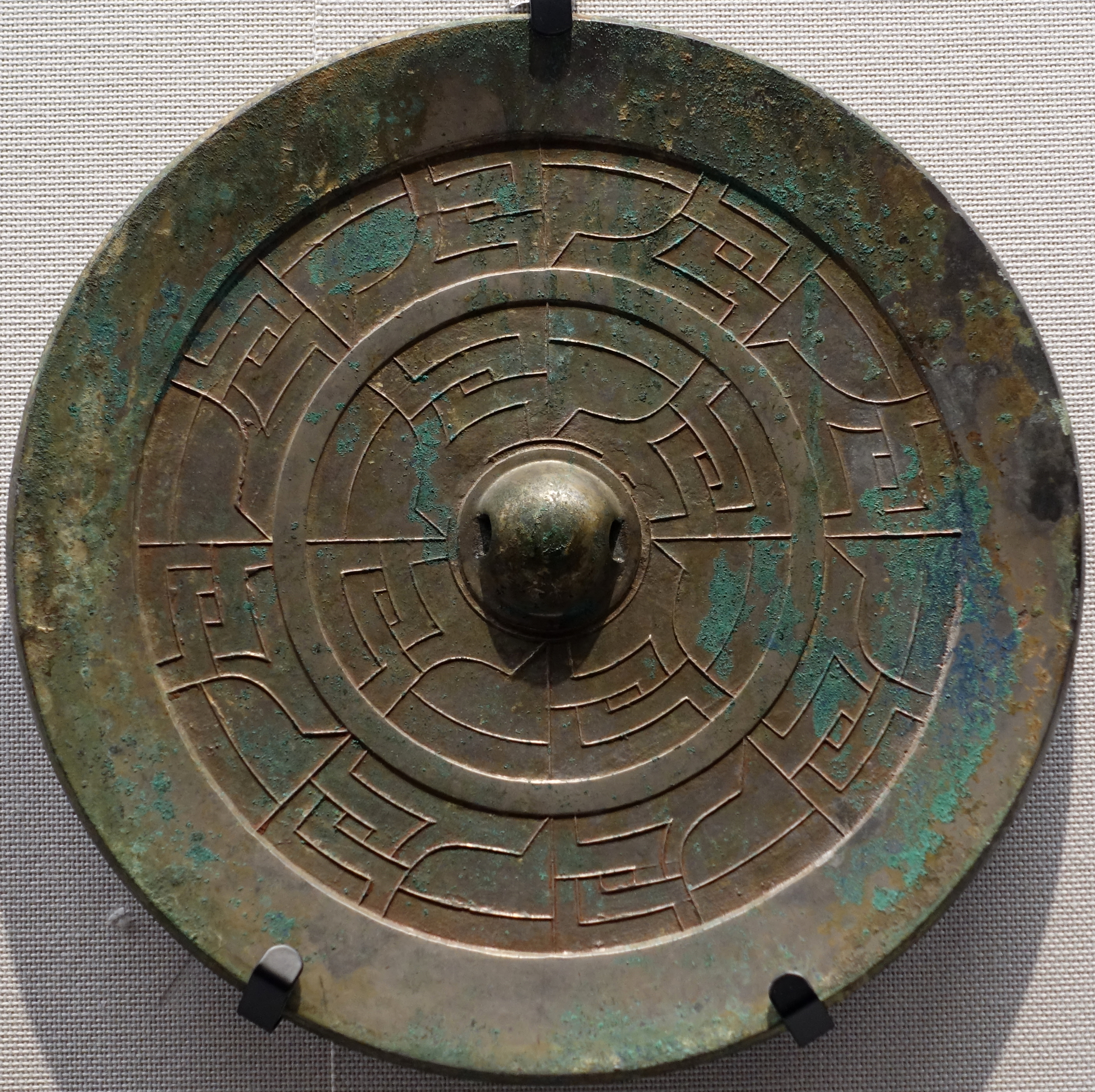
A mirror with a straight arc pattern with a plain border excavated from the Shinyama burial mound, Nara Prefecture (Collection of the Imperial Household Agency).

The first state Shinto rituals occurred in the 4th century. Large numbers of religious artifacts such as bronze mirrors and iron weapons with similarities to the kofun grave goods of the late 4th century in the Yamato region have been excavated from Munakata Taisha on Okinoshima in Munakata, Fukuoka. This indicates that Yamato Kingship rituals began on Okinoshima prior to this. Ritual objects such as small bronze mirrors have also been excavated at Mount Miwa which match those at Munakata Taisha, which lends credibility to the theory that rituals at Mount Miwa (home later to the Ōmiwa Shrine) began at approximately the same time as those on Okinoshima. It is believed that the 4th century, with the rituals held at the early shrines of Munaka Taisha and Ōmiwa Shrine, was when the base of the following Shinto faith developed.

The 5th century sees the spread sekisei mozōhin (石製模造品; small pieces of stone shaped like larger objects such as tools) across Japan. These were originally used in rituals in the Yamato region, and their spread suggests the Yamato Kingship expanded across the Japanese archipelago. Of particular note are the many sekisei mozōhin of haji pottery, takatsuki tables, and magatama beads discovered on the eastern side of the country at the Miyanaka Jōri Site Ōfunatsu of Kashima, Ibaraki or the Odaki Ryōgenji Site in Minamibōsō, Chiba, which indicates Yamato Kingship rituals were taking place in these locations. It is believed the Imperial Court later valued the rituals in these regions which led to the establishment of the Kashima Shrine and Awa Shrine with defined holy precincts (神郡, shingun).

Other religious objects of the 5th century include iron grave goods in kofun, as well as sue pottery and cloth excavated from various sites including the Senzokudai Site in Chiba Prefecture and Shussaku Site in Ehime Prefecture, and, therefore, this era is believed to be when the precursors of modern Shinto religious offerings (幣帛, heihaku) developed.

The 6th century brings changes in kofun funerary rituals and a shift from vertical stone burial chambers to horizontal. The exact nature of these kofun funerary rituals was determined by researching haniwa clay figures depicting people using weapons or tools, gifted animals, and nobles riding horses. These figures give a concrete view at these rituals. The shift from vertical to horizontal stone burial chambers suggests the development of beliefs about the nature of the soul in which the soul leaves the body after death. This can be seen in myths in the Kojiki and Nihon Shiki and is believed to have had an impact on the formation of belief in kami with humanlike aspects.

=== Formation of Ritsuryō Rituals ===
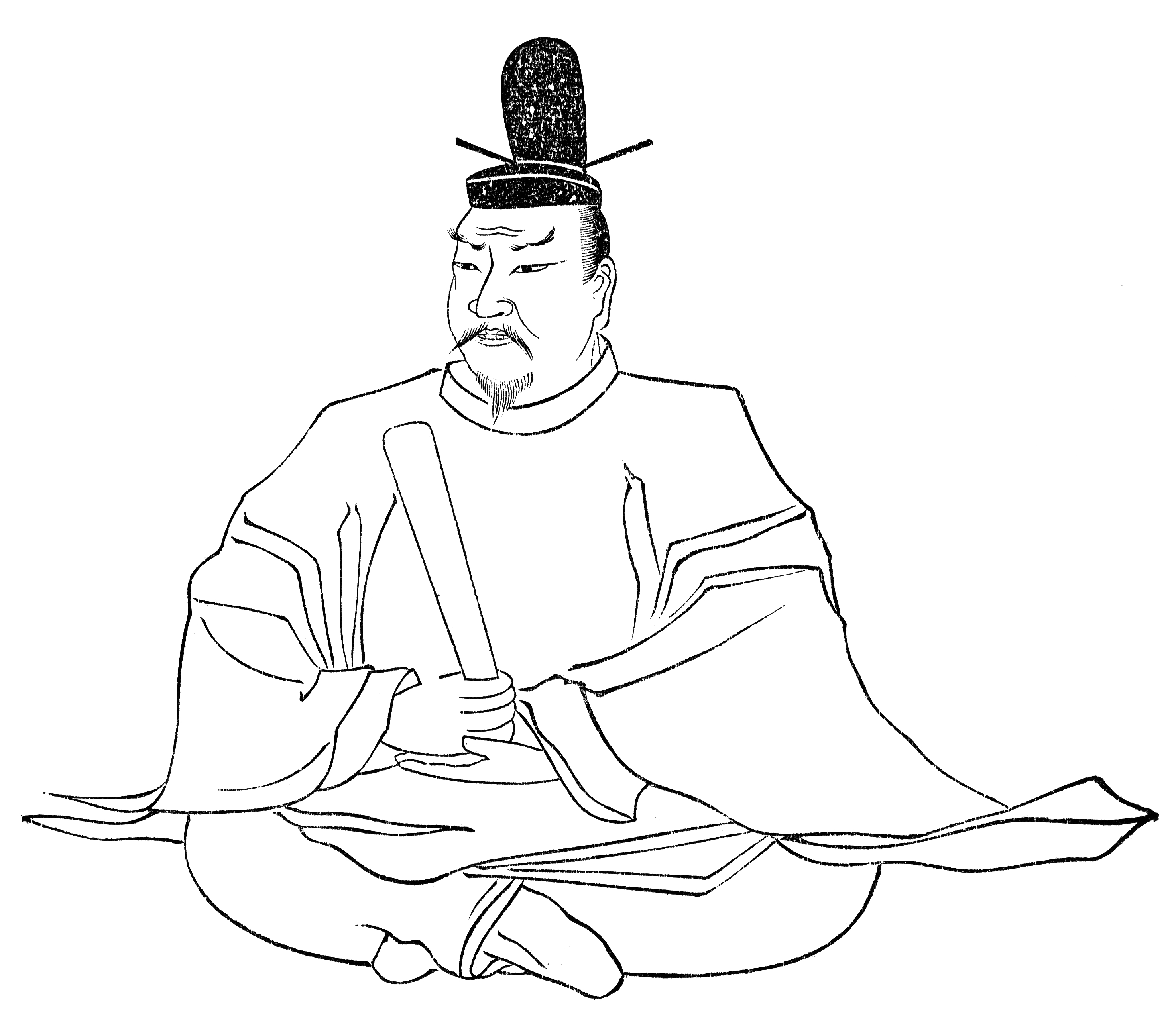
Emperor Tenmu

In the 7th century, the establishment of the Ritsuryō system began primarily during the Tenmu period and Jitō period, during which Shinto underwent a major transformation. The systemization of Shinto and the development of an institutional framework of its rituals progressed based on the faiths formed from the Kofun period onward while incorporating aspects from external beliefs, as ritual systems, shrines, and ceremonies developed.

The public ritual system of the ritsuryō state was developed in accordance with the Jingi Ryō (神祇令; lit. "Code of the Kami"). It is believed the Jingo Ryō was established at the same stage as the Asuka Kiyomihara Code and that codes from the Tang dynasty were used as reference. While the regulations for the management and administration of the rituals did follow in accordance with this code, the nature of the rituals was almost entirely unique to Japan, meaning the Jingi Ryō can be thought of as a reformation of Japan-specific religious beliefs based on the Tang code.

The Jingi Ryō established the Department of Divinities, the administrative department for overseeing rituals, as well as the director position the jingi-haku (神祇伯). It was under this jingi-haku that 13 types of rituals were established as state rituals and regulated to occur in accordance with the seasons. These were the Kinen-sai, Chinka-Sai (鎮花祭), Kanmiso-no-Matsuri (神衣祭), Saikusa-no-Matsuri (三枝祭), Ōimi-no-Matsuri (大忌祭), Tatsuta Matsuri (龍田祭), Hoshizume-no-Matsuri (鎮火祭), Michiae-no-Matsuri (道饗祭), Tsukinami-no-Matsuri (月次祭), Kannamesai Festival, Ainame-no-Matsuri (相嘗祭), Mitamashizume-no-Matsuri (鎮魂祭), and Daijō-sai (Niiname-no-Matsuri). The Kinen-sai held in the second month of the lunar calendar as an advance celebration of good harvest. The Chinka-Sai held in the third month of the lunar calendar as flowers petals scatter is held to send off evil spirits. The Tatsuta Matsuri, a prayer to prevent wind damage from typhoons, and the Oimi-no-Matsuri, a prayer to prevent water disasters, are both held in the fourth and eleventh months of the lunar calendar. And just as the Niiname-no-Matsuri held in the eleventh month of the lunar calendar was to show gratitude for freshly harvested grain, the Ritsuryō rituals were characterized by a strong link with the harvest, aligning with the change of the seasons to show gratitude for the blessings of nature which were needed for agriculture. Regulations required the purification of a government official, and there are two types of purifications within the Ritsuryō rituals: the araimi (荒忌), and the maimi (真忌). The maimi consists of the official abstaining entirely from their duties to undergo purification as they dedicate themselves to preparing for the ritual. The araimi only requires abstaining from the rokujiki no kinki (六色の禁法; lit. "six types of taboos") while continuing their duties. The six taboos are mourning, visiting the ill, consuming the meat of four-legged mammals, carrying out executions or sentencing criminals, playing music, and coming in contact with impurities. The government officials could be punished if they failed to conform to this requirement. The festivals were divided into major, medium, and minor rituals depending on the length of the time required for the purifications. For example, a major ritual (of which there is only the Daijō-sai) requires an araimi of one month and a maimi of three days.

Out of the several Ritsuryō state rituals, the Kinen-sai, Tsukinami-no-Matsuri, and Onie-matsuri included a ritual format unique to Japan called heibu (班幣). This involved the Department of Divinities calling an assembly of priests from every formally recognized shrine in the country, where the Nakatomi clan performed ritual prayers and the Inbe clan distributed religious offerings called heihaku to the priests. The priests took the heihaku to offer to the kami of each of their shrines. There were also regulations for the Ōharae, in which the Nakatomi clan first offered an ōnusa to the emperor, and the Yamato no Aya clan and Kawachinohumi clan offered a harae-no-tachi (祓刀; sword used for purification) as well as performed the reading of ritual incantations. Then, a large group of male and female court officials gathered at the haraido (祓所; purified ritual location) in the suzakumon where the Nakatomi clan read purification incantations and divinators of the imperial court performed the purification.

Up until this point, many shrines had no actual buildings, but these buildings started to become established in this period, particularly at officially recognized shrines. The shinkai ranking system was also established at this time, and shrines at which miracles occurred were assigned a jinpu (神封) (a shrine equivalent of a fuko (封戸) which established the shrine as a partial tax recipient) and a shinkai rank, and particularly venerated shrines were given a shingun holy precinct. Some shrines also received a type of citizen assigned to the shrine known as kanbe (神戸) as well as shrine-owned farm fields called kanda (神田) in which they worked to support the economic requirements of the shrine. Regions without officially-recognized shrines continued without physical shrine buildings. Someone was selected to act as the hafuri (祝), a person in charge of rituals, and they conducted agriculture-related rituals in spring, when the rice was planted, and fall, at harvest, to thank the kami. However, as time went on, government officials began visiting these places where the rituals were held where they informed the locals of the country's laws, adding an official aspect to these rituals, and the establishment of physical shrines spread across the country.

The ritual system of the Ise Shrine was also developed during this period, and, during the reign of Emperor Temmu, the yuki (悠紀) and suki (主基) (regions to provide rice for the emperor's ascension ceremony) were selected through divination, and the emperor would dine with Amaterasu while facing the direction of Ise, which formed the Daijō-sai as it is known in its modern form. The saiō system also came to be in which an unmarried female member of the imperial family was sent to serve at the Ise Shrine, and the practice at the Ise Shrine of shikinen-sengū (式年遷宮) began during the reign of Empress Jitō which is the practice of rebuilding all the shrines buildings at once every approximately 20 years.

Shinto had an influence on the compilation of national history, a duty which was formed during the reign of Emperor Temmu and developed further during the reign of Empress Genmei. The Kojiki and Nihonshiki were compiled during the 8th century and contain Japanese myths in the form of tales from the Age of the Gods, as well as stories of Emperor Jimmu and how he established the country. The compilations were the basis of the imperial family's claim as the rightful rulers. Efforts were made to link ancient rituals to the kami believed to be the progenitor of the imperial family, such as by assuming the kami of Munakata Taisha (the Three Female Deities of Munakata) are the three goddesses birthed by Amaterasu, while the origins of the court ritual clans such as the Nakatomi clan, Inbe clan, and Sarume-no-kimi people were sought after in the world of myth.

=== The Transformation of Ritsuryō and Heian Rituals ===
The Ritsuryō ritual system transformed during the Heian period (794–1185) as the Ritsuryō system was relaxed.

In 798, it became impossible to maintain the heibu system of distributing religious offerings to all shrines in the country, resulting in the shrines being divided into two types: the kanpeisha (官幣社) which continued to receive their religious offerings from the Department of Divinities, and kokuheisha (国幣社) which received began to receive theirs from their provincial government. Shrines were further divided in greater and lesser shrines, as well as some shrines with particularly powerful miraculous powers classified as myōjin taisha (名神大社). These classifications were outlined in the Engishiki Jinmyōchō of 927.

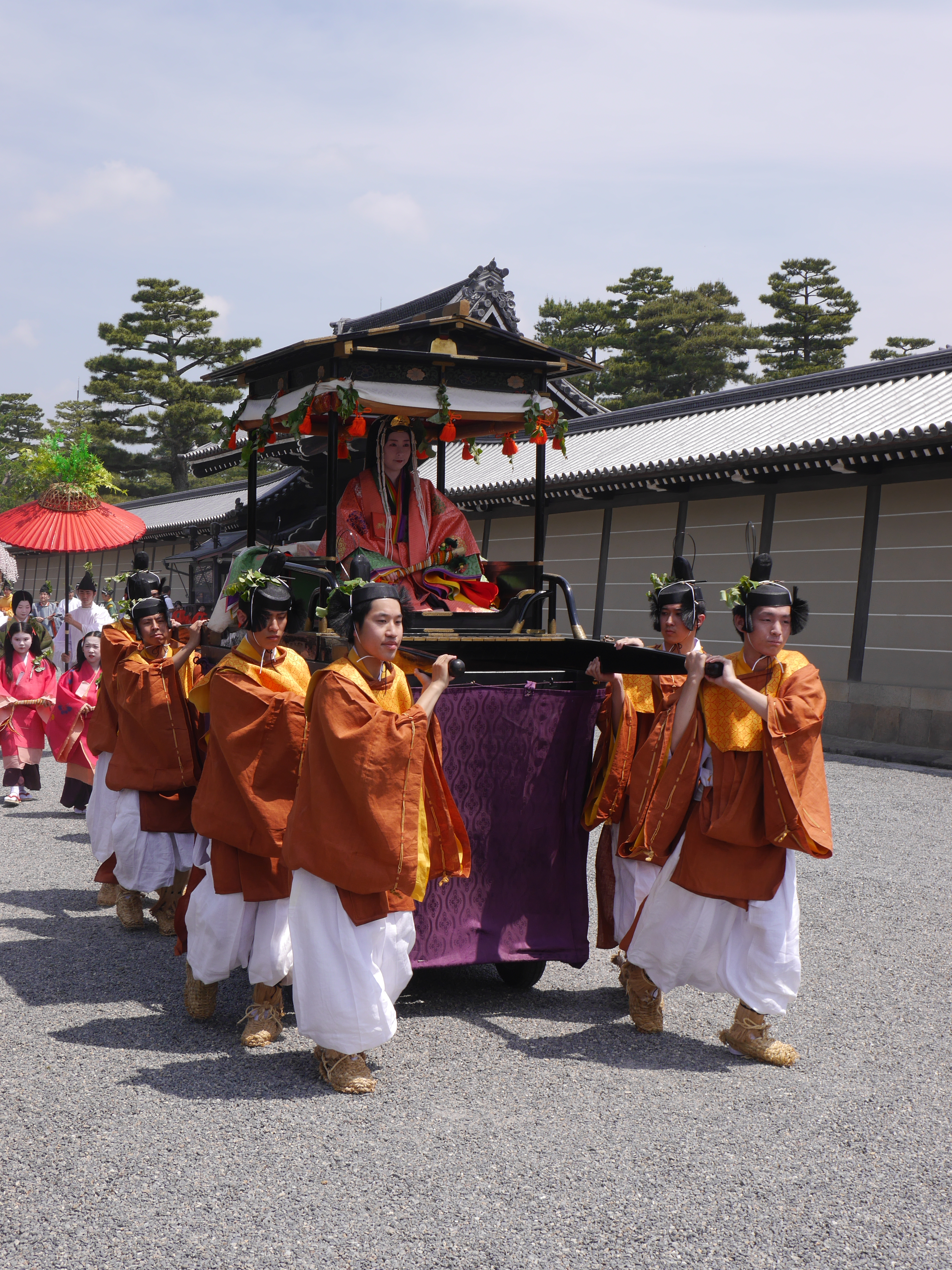
The Aoi Matsuri Festival is a typical festival of the Heian period. It has been preserved in its original form.

As the imperial court expanded along with the relaxation of the Ritsuryō system, the emperor and their close advisors became directly involved in regular rituals of shrines that had particularly strong connections to the imperial court, rather than the Department of Divinities overseeing this duty, which led to the development of kōsai (公祭; lit. "public festival"), officially recognized and officiated rituals, during the late Nara and early Heian periods. During the reign of Empress Kōken, Empress Kōmyō and others began changing the regular rituals of the many kasuga jinja (春日神社), shrines housing the patron kami of the Fujiwara clan, into kōsai rituals. Special rituals also became more common as the emperor's authority grew. These were rituals for specific kami, and in addition to the regular rituals, in which the emperor themself dispatched the imperial representative. The first example of this was the Kamo Rinjisai (賀茂臨時祭; lit. "Kamo special festival") held by Emperor Uda during his reign. The regular festival that developed after this retained the "special" name.

The emperor and their close advisors became directly involved with even more rituals such as the emperor's Maichōgai (毎朝御拝; lit. "every morning worship"), morning prayers sent to Ise Shrine, conducted at a platform within the palace called the Ishibainodan (石灰壇) or the Ichidai-Ichido no Daijinbō-Shi (一代一度の大神宝使), a tradition which began in this period in which a court messenger takes sacred relics to specific shrines at an emperor's ascension. The practice of gyōkō (行幸) first occurred during Emperor Suzaku's reign. Gyōkō is the practice of the emperor themself going to a shrine and dispatching the ritual official from there, while up until that point, the emperor would have stayed in the imperial court and dispatched the officials from there.

At this time, the nobles became more interested in ujigami rituals, and we see several collections of traditions written during this time. There is the Kogo Shūi written by Inbe no Hironari which consisted of an orally transmitted history of the Inbe clan and also acted as a counter to the Nakatomi clan. There is also the Sendai Kuji Hongi which contains a collection of histories about the different clans thought to have been compiled by the Mononobe clan, as well as the Shinsen Shōjiroku containing the lineage and histories of the various clans which divided the clans into the branches of divine ancestry, imperial ancestry, foreign ancestry, and those of unknown ancestry.

The Engishiki, containing laws and customs, was completed in 927. Volumes one through ten contain laws regarding Shinto, and these ten volumes are collectively referred to as the Jingishiki (神祇式). The contents of each volume are as follows: One and two, seasonal rituals. Three, special rituals. Four, the Ise Shrine. Five, position at the Ise Shrine. Six, the role of saiin priestesses. Seven, Daijō-sai. Eight, norito. Nine and ten, the upper and lower kami.

In addition, as it was no longer possible to maintain the practice of sending religious offerings to all myōjin taisha shrines, it turned to a practice called kinen kokuhouhei (祈年穀奉幣) which involved making offerings only to the most prominent of these shrines twice a year. This practice expanded to sixteen shrines later, then eventually to Twenty-Two Shrines, and this continued until 1449 (the first year of the Hōtoku era) in the Late Middle Ages.

In regards to local rituals, provincial officials were dispatched and ranked the shrines in that province, developing the Ichinomiya system which ordered the shrines to be worshiped at. These officials noted the shrines that saw worship in a kokunai jinmyōchō (国内神名帳; lit. "domestic shrine register"), and, later, shrines of ninomiya rank or below were grouped together into a sōja shrine.

=== Synthesis with and Separation from Buddhism ===
After the official introduction of Buddhism in the 6th century, Buddhism spread across Japan through the conflict between the Monobe clan and the Soga clan over the adoption of Buddhism. Early on in the adoption, however, Buddhism was not seen as different from Shinto and was taken up in the same way as local Shinto had been. Buddha was called Adashikuni-no-kami (蕃神; lit. "kami of barbarians"), and some women, such as Shima, Datto Shiba's daughter, left home to maintain Buddhist statues similar to what miko did. Later, in the 7th century, the kami were believed to reside in devaloka and thought to be seeking liberation just like humans. Jingū-ji were built within shrines as locations where Buddhist practices could occur such as reading Buddhist scriptures before the kami. An early example of this is the jingū-ji at Tado Shrine founded by the monk Mangan. Buddhist temples also made attempts to move Shinto closer to Buddhism which resulted in the belief that kami were also Defenders of the Justice, beings who protect dharma, and so jinjū-sha shrines were built into Buddhist temples.

Several faiths appeared during the Heian period which contained elements of both Shinto and Buddhism such as belief in Goryō and the Kumano faith which regards Kumano a Pure land, and the influence of Buddhism led to the creation of statues of kami inspired by Buddhist statues. Shinto-Buddhims syncretism continued as time went on, giving rise to the honji suijaku theory which claims kami are the temporary forms of Buddhist deities manifested in Japan to save the people. There were also instances of using Buddhist deity terms such as bosatsu (菩薩; bodhisattva) and gongen when referring to kami, as well as the practice of carving buddhist images, the true forms of the deities, on the backs of mirrors, believed to be the house of the kami. These mirrors were called mishōtai (御正体; lit. "honorable true form") because they depicted the kami's true form.

At the same time, the desire to separate Shinto and Buddhism was seen in the imperial court and among the shrines. Regulations such as the Jōgangishiki (貞観儀式) and the Gishiki (儀式) forbade central officials and officials from the Five Provinces from conducting Buddhist services during the period of the Daijō-sai. Buddhist monks and nuns were also forbidden from attending medium rituals or minor rituals that occurred during purification of the imperial palace, and Buddhist services could not be held in the palace. From the middle of the Heian period onwards, the emperor was also required to stop any Buddhist activities during the period of purification for rituals in which the emperor conducts the purification themself, such as for the Niiname-no-Matsuri, Tsukinami-no-Matsuri, and the Kannamesai Festival, and other government officials were also meant to avoid Buddhist practices during this time. At the Ise Shrine, some words were considered taboo. For Buddha (仏, hotoke) they used nakago (中子; lit. "center") and for Buddhist priest (僧侶, sōryo) they used kaminaga (髪長; lit. "long hair"). These indirect terms were even used at the saiō priestess's residence. While Shinto and Buddhism had begun to blend as a faith, ritualistically, they remained two separate systems.

=== Development of Shugendō and Onmyōdō ===
In ancient Japan, mountains were believed to be other worlds, such as the afterlife, and were rarely entered, but they became areas for ascetic practices during the Nara period under the influence of various factors such as esoteric Buddhism, Onmyōdō, and kami worship. One figure in the early stages of this practice was En no Ozunu, and Shugendō was formed as these ascetic mountain practices developed into an organization near the end of the Heian period, with Kinpu Mountain, Kumano Sanzan, the Three Mountains of Dewa, and Mount Togakushi prominent examples of mountains of power. This was followed by the establishment of various Shugendō schools such as the Honzanha (本山派) of the Tendai school, the Tōzanha (当山派) of the Shingon school, the Haguroha (羽黒派) based at the Three Mountains of Dewa, and the Hikosanha (英彦山派) based at Mount Hiko.

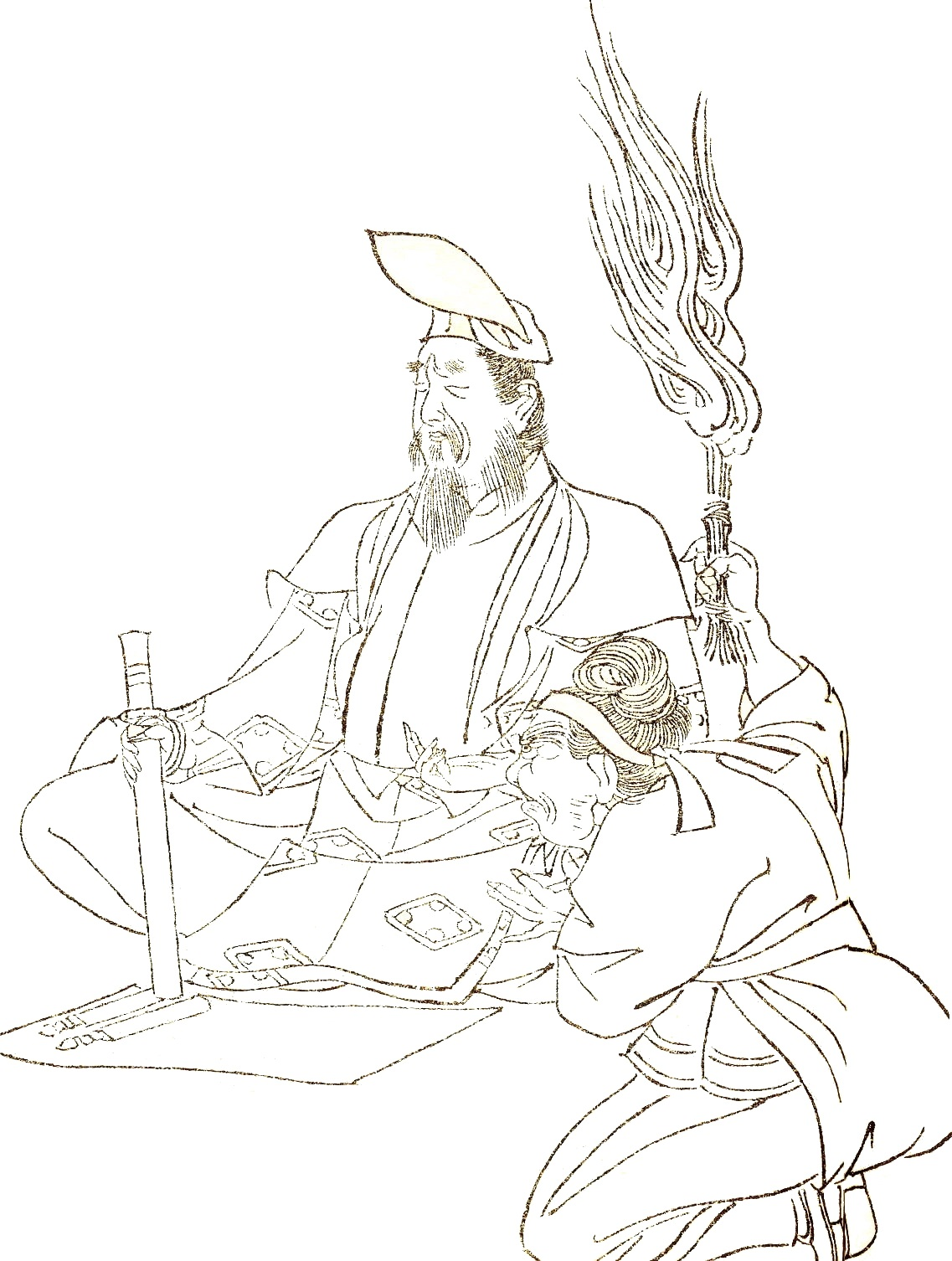
Abe no Seimei

Onmyōdō was established during the Heian period by the imperial court. It developed independently in Japan based on influences from the philosophies of yin and yang and wuxing which came over from China. Onmyōdō's development also had an impact on Shinto, as some rituals such as the Ōharae and Michiae-no-Matsuri (道饗祭) which had been conducted by the Department of Divinities were later conducted by the Onmyōryō (陰陽寮), the department of Onmyōdō. Additionally, the ritual text for the Ōharae, also known as the Nakatomi Harae (中臣祓), changed into the Nakatomi Saimon (中臣祭文; lit. "Nakatomi ritual text") and became used by Onmyōdō priests. The change was that the original ritual incantation was in the senmyōtai (宣命体) style, in which the words are directed to the ritual's attendees, while the newer incantation was in the sōjōtai (奏上体) style, in which the words are directed to the kami. However, while Shinto rituals were affairs of the state, Onmyōdō rituals were conducted in an environment of heightened materialistic desires of the aristocrats to request personal success and the curing of illness. Beginning in the 10th century, the department overseeing Onmyōdō was almost entirely led by successive generations of the Abe and Kamo clans.

== Middle Ages ==
=== The Shogunate's Shinto System ===
The shrine system went under a reorganization under the shogunate with the establishment of the Kamakura shogunate. Minamoto no Yoritomo, the founder of the shogunate, was a devout follower of Shinto and officially acknowledged the Ise Grand Shrine's claim over its territory. Other particularly venerated shrines were the Izusan Shrine, Hakone Shrine, and Mishima Shrine, and it became custom for future Shoguns to visit Izu Hakone in January every year a practice called Nisho Gongen (二所権現) which may have been the origin of modern-day Hatsumōde. The Magistrate of Temples and Shrines was established in 1194. The Kamakura shogunate carried on the piety of Minamoto no Yoritomo, as seen in Article 1 of the Goseibai Shikimoku enacted in 1232 which called for the reformation of shrines which should focus solely on carrying out rituals. Additionally, the Kantō Shinsei (関東新制), a legal code released by the shogunate as opposed to the emperor, contained several regulations surrounding religion such as those relating to development of Shinto institutions and the prevention of the misconduct of Shinto priests. Government positions such as the kitō bugyō (祈祷奉行) and shinji bugyō (神事奉行) were established which oversaw religious events rather than the administration of shrines. The Senjū clan began to inherit the kitō bugyō position during the Muromachi period.

The jisha-densō (寺社伝奏) position had been established within the imperial court and was responsible for conveying requests from the shrines to the emperor. However, once the shogunate came into power, this shifted to reporting to the shogun then communicating the shogun's decisions back to the shrines. The retired emperor also conducted more frequent pilgrimages to Kumano Taisha during this period, and the imperial court began to focus more on Shinto rituals as its authority declined as the shogunate rose. Emperor Juntoku wrote in the Kinpishō (禁秘抄), "Shinto matters first, all other matters after."

=== The People's Faith in the Middle Ages ===
The faith of the common people also changed during the Middle Ages. During ancient times, the people's faith centered on rituals worshipping local ujigami to pray for the prosperity of their community. In the Middle Ages, however, kami with mystical power were divided in a process called bunrei and taken to other regions, leading to an increase in shrines called kanjōgata-jinja (勧請型神社) housing these divided kami where people prayed for individual prosperity.

Particularly widely worshipped were Kumano Gongen (熊野権現), Hachiman, Inari Ōkami, and Amaterasu. The region of Kumano was originally believed to be another world where the spirits of the dead went, but the syncretism with Buddhism led to the belief that Kumano was a manifestation of the Pure Land in the real world, with Kumano Gongen at Kumano Hongū Taisha believed to be Amitābha. Many people went on pilgrimages in groups to Kumano to pray to pass on to the next world in death as well as to receive prosperity in this world, so much so that they became known as the "ants' pilgrimage to Kumano" as they resembled a line of ants. Visits by the retired emperor became common during the Insei period as well. Hachiman was brought from Usa Jingū as a divided kami and protector of Emperor Seiwa by Iwashimizu Hachimangū, while also being worshiped as the guardian kami of the Seiwa Genji clan, while Minamoto no Yoshiie also established Tsurugaoka Hachimangū in Kamakura with the divided Hachiman. When Minamoto no Yoritomo established the Kamakura Shogunate, Gokeijin throughout Japan who followed the Kamakura Shogunate also prayed to Hachiman in their own territories, and the Hachiman faith spread throughout the country. Inari was originally the clan deity of the Hata clan, but in the Heian period (794–1185), Inari was revered as the guardian deity of Toji, and was combined with Dakini to spread throughout Japan as a deity of agriculture. In the Fushimi Inari-taisha, the first day of the first month of the lunar year, many common people would come to the shrine to pray. The first day of the first month of the lunar year is the time when the gods of the mountains descend to the villages to become the gods of the rice fields in the Tanokami faith.

Originally, it was forbidden for anyone but the emperor to make religious offerings or give prayers at the Ise Shrine, but it and other shrines lost their financial foundation in the Middle Ages under the Ritsuryō system which led to religious officials from the shrine, mostly oshi (御師), actively gathering contributions and funds for building costs. They did this through proselytizing and conducting private prayers at manors across the country which spread the Ise faith first to lords and the warrior class, then to the common people. The earlier Kumano faith also contributed to the spread of the Ise faith as pilgrims on the Kumano Pilgrimage had to pass through Ise Shrine along the Ise-Ji Route, resulting in many people beginning to worship the kami at Ise Shrine. An account of the rebuilding of the outer shrines of Ise Shrine in 1287 in the Kanchūki (勘仲記) from the Kamakura Period states, "The exact number of the thousands, tens of thousands of worshippers who attended is unknown," showing the large numbers of common people who traveled to the Ise Shrine.

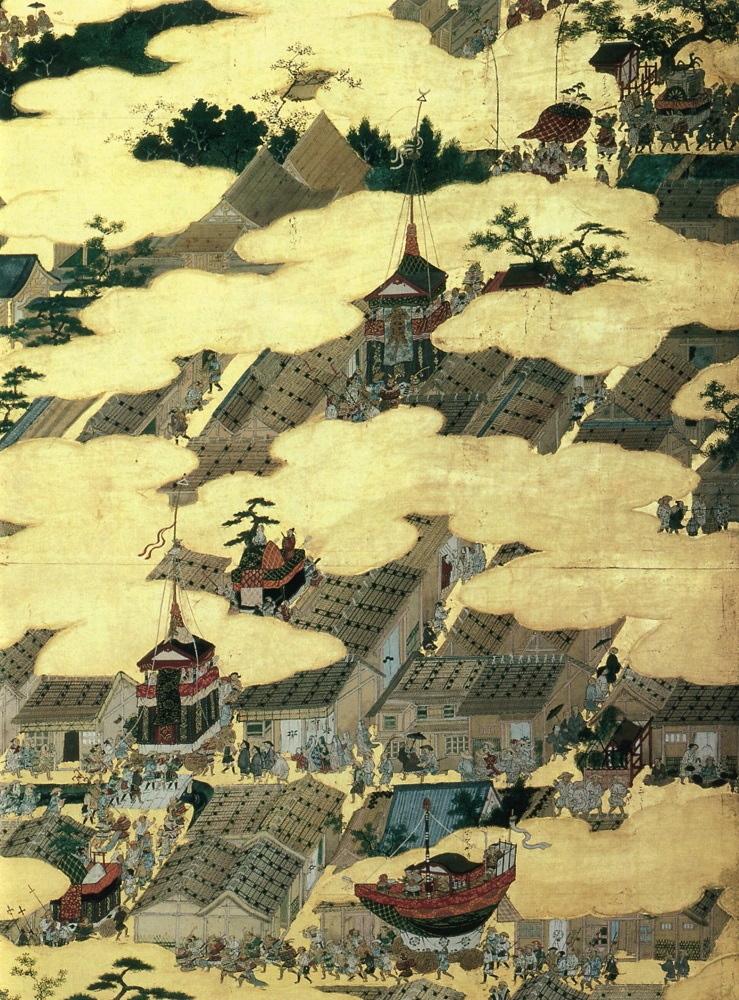
A scene from the medieval Gion Festival depicted in National Treasure (Japan), Yonezawa City Uesugi Museum, by Kanō Eitoku

As worship at a main shrine increased, the kami of those main shrines were divided and brought to various villages. With the rise of the shōen manorial system as well, the kami of shrines of the manorial lords were divided and brought across Japan resulting in a third of all shrines of modern Japan being associated with one of the five faiths of Hachiman, Ise, Tenjin, Inari, or Kumano.

Festivals for the commonfolk also spread within urban areas. The people began to host the Gion Festival every year after 863 when the Imperial Court held an open goryōe (御霊会) at temple of Shinsenen in which the people of the city could participate. During the goryōe, the mikoshi was paraded around town from the ritual welcome of the kami at the beginning of the festival until the return to the shrine at the end which was thought to increase the spiritual power of the kami. The residents of Kyoto prepared the otabisho resting places for the mikoshi as well as prepared for and conducted the rites, meaning the Imperial Court had little involvement in the public aspects, resulting in a public festival with a strong local feel and identity. Other festivals established by the middle of the Heian period were the Kitano Goryōe, Matsuo Festival, Imamiya Festival, and Inari Festival.

Furthermore, as the villages of the manors became more autonomous and as the self-governing communal sō (惣) villages were established, administrative village organizations overseeing faith activities called miyaza (宮座) gained attention as organizers of festivals. The miyaza were led by elders known as otona (オトナ; lit. "adult") or toshiyori (年寄; lit. "elder") while younger members were responsible for conducting the rituals. Shrines became a spiritual center for the villagers as they recited oaths to the kami there when the village made decisions, as well as conducted vow ceremonies (一味神水, ichimijinsui) when forming a group such as an ikki (一揆). The villagers would visit the shrine even during their daily lives as farmers, and the head of the shrine was selected for a year-long term from among the villagers.

=== Development of Shinto Theory and the Honji Suijaku Theory ===
A movement spread through the intellectual class to develop a doctrine for and incorporate the religion of Shinto into their ideals. The first attempt was the Ryōbu Shintō (両部神道) Theory developed around the mid-Heian period by esoteric Buddhist monks using esoteric terminology. An early example of this is seen in Shingon Fuhō San'yō-shō (真言付法纂要抄; Collected Essentials on Shingon Dharma) written by Shingon Buddhist monk Seison in the 11th century in which he depicts Amaterasu as the same being as Vairocana and argues Japan is well suited to the spread of esoteric Buddhism. The most important Shinto theories of the Middle Ages were derived from this theory.

Following this, Buddhist monks began to frequent the Ise Great Shrine, including Chōgen in 1186, with many Ryōbu Shintō texts written in monk residences located within the Ise Great Shrine's territory. The Mitsuno-gashiwa Denki (三角柏伝記) and the Nakatomi no Harae Kunge (中臣祓訓解) are believed to be early examples of such texts. These texts place the shrine's Inner Shrine as the Womb Realm and the Outer Shrine as the Diamond Realm of esoteric Buddhism, and both together are seen as a manifestation in this world of a mandala. Additionally, Amaterasu is said to be Brahmā as Surya, while Toyouke-hime is said to be Brahmā as Chandra. The Reikiki (麗気記) was compiled afterwards as a collection of secret theories based in Shingon Buddhism and became a representative text of Ryōbu Shintō.

As Shinto manuscripts and writings were developed at temples, Ryōbu Shintō-style schools were established to pass down the writings, along with the establishment of several other factions including Sanbōin-ryū (三宝院流) founded by Imperial Prince-Monk Shukaku Hosshinō and Miwa-ryū (三輪流) which developed at Byōdō-ji Temple near Mount Miwa. These Ryōbu Shintō schools passed down their secrets while conducting abhisheka and initiations in a similar way to esoteric Buddhism in a practice known as Shinto Abhesheka (神道灌頂, Shintō kanjō).

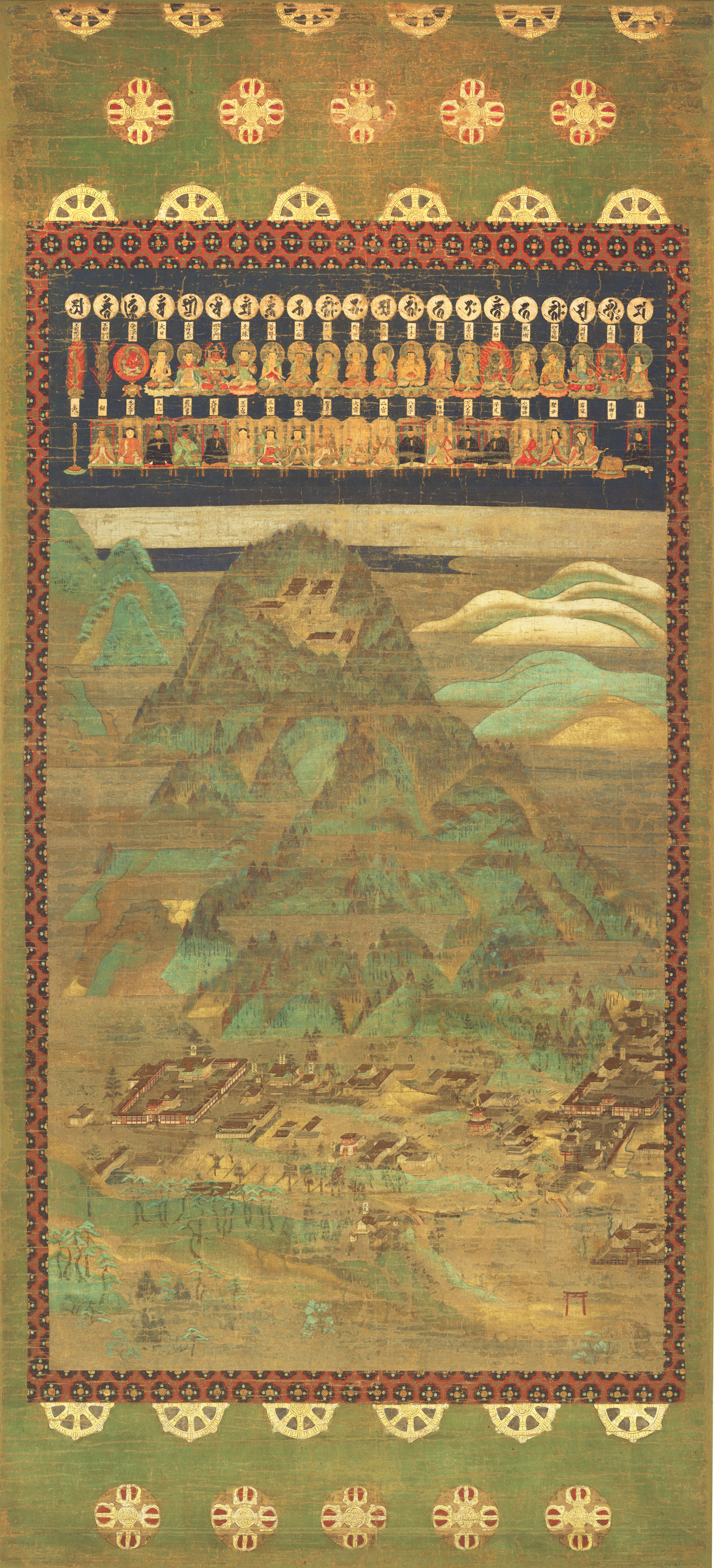
Mandala of Hiyoshi Sanno-gu (Muromachi period). The upper part of the mandala shows the deities, main deities, and seeds of the 21 shrines. The lower part is a bird's-eye view of the 21 Sanno shrines, depicting the two shrines at the top of Hachioji Mountain and the group of shrines at the foot of the mountain.

Shinto theories developed not only from Shingon Buddhism, but also from ideals based on Buddhist-Shinto syncretism from the view of Tiantai Buddhism. The foundation of this was an explanation of the significance of the kami of Hiyoshi Taisha, the guardian kami of Mount Hiei, through the lens of Tendai Buddhist philosophy. This was called Sannō Shintō.

The Yōtenki (耀天記) was written in the 13th century, and it was said the Buddha manifested as Ōnamuchi of the main shrine, Nishi Hongū, of Hiyoshi Taisha to save the people of Japan, a small country in the Degenerate Age of Dharma. Additionally, the monk Gigen (義源) wrote the Sange Yōryakki (山家要略記) in the 14th century in which he asserted not just Ōnamuchi but all kami of Hiyoshi Taisha were manifestations of buddhas. Afterwards, Gigen's disciple, Kōshō (光宗), wrote the Keiran Shūyōshū (渓嵐拾葉集) in which he systemized the doctrine by linking all Tendai Buddhism to Hiyoshi Taisha kami. He also claimed the Hiyoshi Taisha kami innately resided within people's hearts. As the belief of original enlightenment spread, the idea that people are already enlightened regardless of their religious practices, these writings began to claim the kami, as beings more familiar to the Japanese people, were in fact the true form and buddhas were a manifestation of the kami in what was known as the inverted honji suijaku theory (反本地垂迹説, han-honji suijaku). Shinto theory in the Tendai school was primarily developed by a group of monks known as kike (記家; lit. "chroniclers").

Sansha Takusen (三社託宣) hanging scrolls began to appear in the late Kamakura period in Tōdai-ji or the ancient region of Nara. These were the words of the three kami Amaterasu, Hachiman, and Kasuga Daimyojin, expressing the tenets of honesty, purity, and mercy in kanbun style. These three kami in particular become the object of this worship because it was said they, Amaterasu, the ancestor deity of the imperial family, Hachiman, the patron deity of the samurai class (Seiwa Genji), and Kasuga Daimyojin, the patron deity of the noble class (the Fujiwara clan), entered into a divine pact with each other in the Age of the Gods, resulting in the belief that it was in the Age of the Gods that those three classes were bound to work in coordination as they rule.

As Buddhist-Shinto syncretism spread during the Middle Ages, various shrines began to create engi (縁起), writings and illustrations of religious histories, particularly of the religious institutions themselves. Prominent examples include the Kasuga Gongen Genki-e (春日権現験記絵), the Kita no Tenjin Engi (北野天神縁起), and the Hachiman Gudōkun (八幡愚童訓), as well as the Shintōshū (神道集), a collection of such texts created in the 14th century. It is believed these texts and illustrations were created by the religious institutions to receive reliable patronage from the samurai class as the Imperial Court declined at the outset of the Middle Ages. This period also saw the spread of Middle Ages Mythology, a body of Shinto myths reinterpreted through a lens of Buddhist-Shinto syncretism.

The Honji Suijaku theory was incorporated into Shin Buddhism which rapidly grew during the Kamakura period. One Buddhist monk of the school, Zonkaku, authored the Shoshin Honkaishū (諸神本懐集) in which he divided Japan's shrines into gonsha (権社), shrines which housed a manifestation of a buddha, and jissha (実社), shrines which did not, and argued that only the kami of gonsha should be worshipped. Even in the Nichiren school of Buddhism, the monk Nichiren himself actively incorporated Shinto into the school, which his disciple Nichizō systemized into Hokke Shinto. Their belief was that if the true dharma as based on the Lotus Sutra was correctly conducted, then the Thirty Guardian Deities (三十番神, Sanjū Banshin) with Atsuta no Ōkami at their head would protect Japan, each one protecting for a day in a rotation. Other schools to take up the Honji Suijaku theory with varying approaches were the Jishū school, the Rinzai school, and the Sōtō school.

=== Japan as a Divine Land and the Inverted Honji Suijaku Theory ===
As that was occurring within the Buddhist faith, Shinto institutions were also receiving influence from external religions such as Buddhism while movements to create doctrine for and internalize Shinto grew more actively. Inverted honji suijaku theories which placed the kami above buddhas also developed in opposition to the honji suijaku theory. The collapse of the Ritsuryō system produced a sense of crisis among the Shinto authorities as the foundation that supported their existence was shaken. Shinto authorities began creating writings for Shinto rituals in an attempt to gain religious authority and claim Shinto's place in resistance to Buddhism as Buddhist authorities were actively closing in on the world of the kami and attempting to reinterpret Shinto using Buddhist theories. Also in the background during the creation of systemized Shinto theory was Japan's victory in the Mongol invasions of Japan which resulted in a belief of Japan as a divine land protected by the kami, a belief which strengthened during this period along with the authority of the Ise Shrine through the increase throughout Japan of jingu mikuriya (神宮御厨), territories belonging to the shrine originally for the production of offerings to the kami.

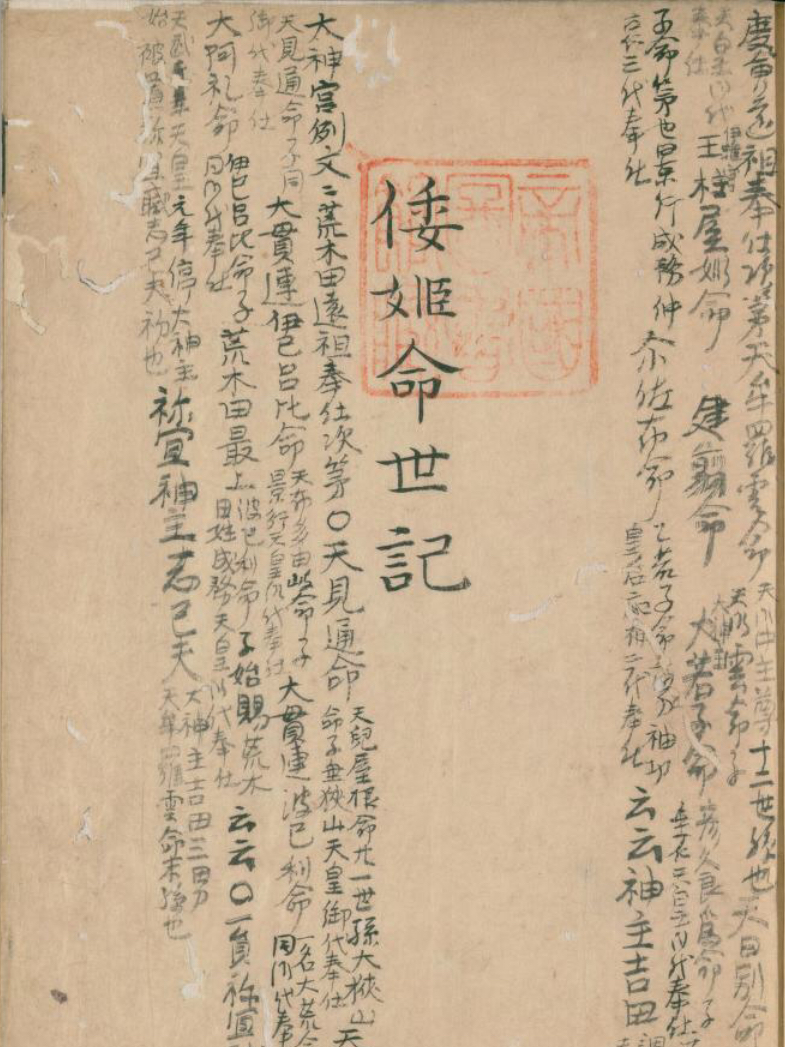
One of the sutras of Ise Shinto, "Wahime-no-Mikoto Seiki" (transcribed in 1769 by Togetsu Maro, a priest at the shrine)

The first school to do this was Ise Shinto, established in the mid-Kamakura period. Ise Shinto is a school of Shinto established primarily by the Watarai clan who were priests of the Outer Shrine with the Shintō Gōbusho (神道五部書; Five Shinto Scriptures) as central texts. Of the five Scriptures, the Yamatohime-no-Mikoto Seiki (倭姫命世記; Chronicle of Yamatohime-no-mikoto) and Zō Ise Nisho Daijingū Hhōki Hongi (造伊勢二所太神宮宝基本記) were created relatively early. They referenced the Womb World-Diamond World theory of Ryōbu Shintō as they placed the Inner and Outer Shrines on the same level, continuing on with plans to place the Outer Shrine in a superior position. These writings identified the kami of the Outer Shrine, Toyouke-hime, to be Ame-no-Minakanushi, one of the original kami, to increase her standing compared to Amaterasu, as well as defined the Inner Shrine as the Wuxing agent of Fire and the Outer Shrine as the agent of Water in an attempt to raise the Outer Shrine's standing as Water regulates Fire. The kami Takuhadachiji-hime, mother of Ninigi-no-Mikoto, was also placed as a grandchild of Toyouke-hime, inserting Toyouke-hime into the imperial ancestral line. Other movements in addition to these kami theories included an emphasis on Japan as a divine land through preaching the eternal nature of the imperial line, the dignity of the Three Sacred Treasures, and the honor of the shrines, a spread of reason and morality based on the Two Great Virtues of Shinto, honesty and purity, and a focus on the diligent practice of, cleansing prior to, and purification through Shinto rituals.

Ise Shinto further developed as a result of what is known as the imperial character controversy (皇字論争) which revolved around the addition of the character meaning "divine" or "imperial" (皇) was added to the Outer Shrine's name in 1296. Center of the Outer Shrine at the time Yukitada Watarai referenced the first two of the Shintō Gobusho as evidence of the Outer Shrine's legitimacy, authored the further three of the five, Amaterashimasu Ise Nisho Kōtaijingū Gochinza Shidaiki (天照坐伊勢二所皇太神宮御鎮座次第記), Ise Nisho Kōutaijin Gochinza Denki (伊勢二所皇太神御鎮座伝記), and Toyōke Kōtaijin Gochinza Hongi (豊受皇太神御鎮座本記), then spread those writings of Ise Shinto throughout society.

Ieyuki Watarai followed Yukitada Watarai as center of the Outer Shrine and established Ise Shinto. In addition to penning the Ruijū Jingi Hongen (類聚神祇本源) and systemizing Ise Shinto while references various other writings from Neo-Confucianism, Taoism, and Buddhism, he also presented kizen-ron (機前論), a theory unique to Shinto doctrine. According to this theory, the chaotic state that existed prior to the world's formation was calledkizen (機前), that this kizen was the source of consciousness, as well as the essence of the kami. He further preached maintaining purity was how one uses kizen.

Later, Tsuneyoshi Watarai claimed the Inner and Outer Shrines were of equal standing as the Watarai Clan served the Inner Shrine before the Outer Shrine was established and that the view of Toyouke-hime as a kami of Water allowed a comparison of the two kami to the Sun and the Moon. Just as the Sun and the Moon together light the heavens, so do Amaterasu and Toyouke-hime stand together.

Kitabatake Chikafusa

At the opening of the Nanboku-chō period, Kitabatake Chikafusa wrote the Jinnō Shōtōki (神皇正統記; "Chronicles of the Authentic Lineages of the Divine Emperors") and the Gengenshū (元元集) while influenced by Ise Shinto in which he noted the imperial line remained unbroken since the Age of Gods and argued Japan was superior due to being a divine land. He also argued the emperor is required to have Confucian virtues and must not abandon the various teachings of religion. It was also during this period that Tendai monk Jihen also received influence from Ise Shinto and wrote Kuji Hongi Genki (旧事本紀玄義) in which he presented a depiction of the emperor as sovereign and established political discourse within Shinto. Court noble Ichijō Kaneyoshi wrote the Nihon Shoki Sanso (日本書紀纂疏) in which he conducts a philosophical analysis of the scrolls on the Age of Gods of the Nihon Shoki, forming Shinto thought. Inobe-no-Masamichi wrote the Jindai Kankuketsu (神代巻口訣) which discussed Shinto theology through commentary of those same scrolls.

=== Formation of Yoshida Shinto ===
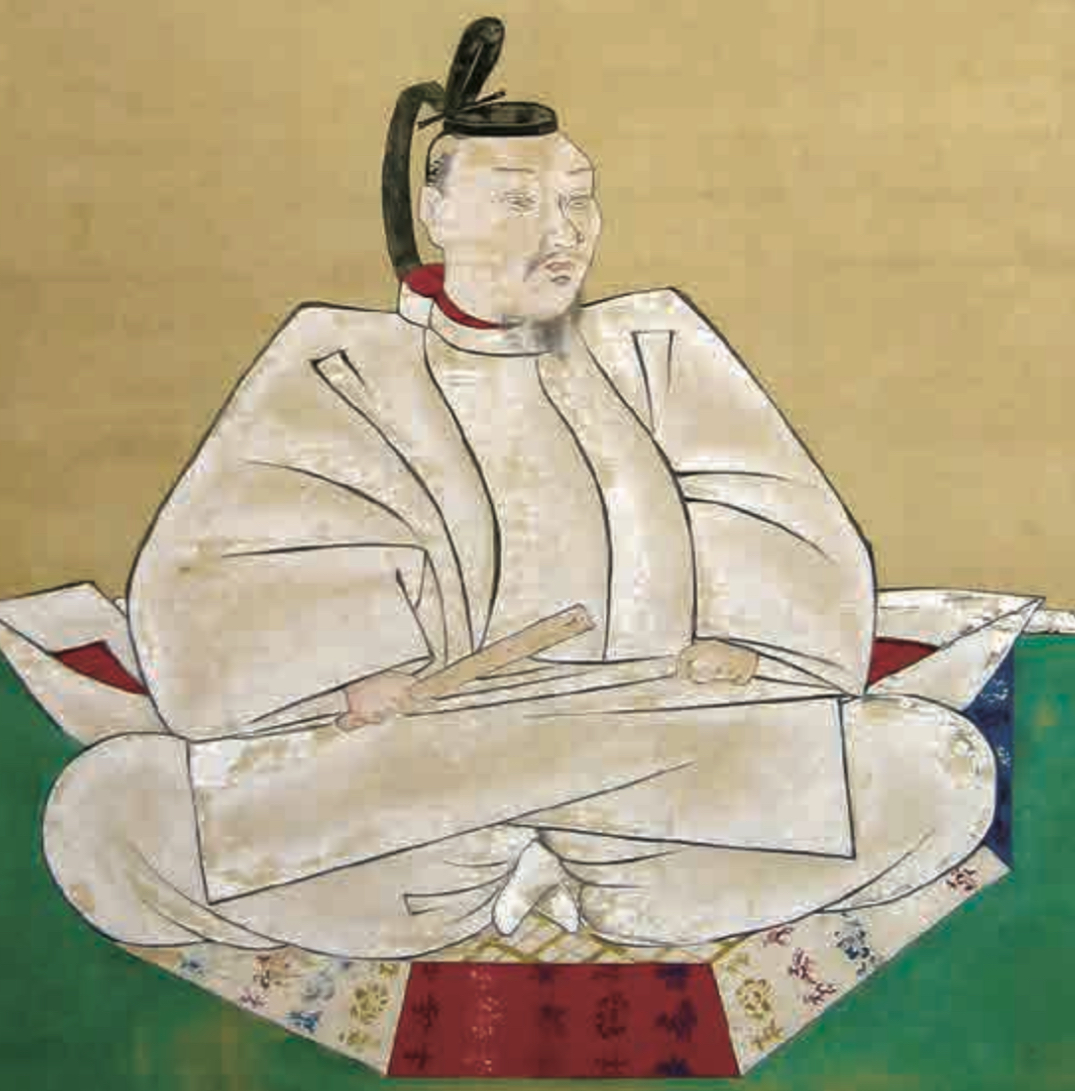
Yoshida Kanetomo

The destruction of Kyoto during the Ōnin War in the Ōnin period affected many temples and shrines and resulted in the cessation of rituals, including the Daijōsai and crowning ceremonies. One Shinto priest most affected by the turmoil was Yoshida Kanemoto. Kanemoto had served at the Yoshida Shrine which was lost in the fires of war, along with tens of lives of the residents living in the area around the shrine. In his turmoil, he fled into the wilds. However, the loss of many ancient texts in the war became an opportunity for new Shinto doctrine to develop in the form of Yoshida Shinto.

The Yoshida family's original name was Urabe, of the Urabe Clan. As Shinto priests, they specialized in tortoise-shell divination and long inherited the position of Senior Assistant Director of Divinities (神祇大副, Jingi Taifu), the second-highest position in the Department of Divinities. In the Middle Ages, Urabe no Kanekata was an expert of research into Japanese texts, as seen in the Shaku Nihongi (釈日本紀) he authored, earning the Yoshida family the monicker of "House of Japanese Chronicles".

Kanemoto went on to write the Shintō Taii (神道大意) and the Yuiitsu Shintō Myōhō Yōshū (唯一神道名法要集) in which he compiled Shinto philosophy from the Middle Ages while incorporating discourse from several other religions to present a new Shinto theory in the form of Yoshida Shinto. In his writings, Kanemoto divided Shinto into three varieties: Honjaku-engi Shintō (本迹縁起神道) (the histories passed down by shrines), Ryōbu-shūgō Shintō (両部習合神道), and Gempon-sōgen Shintō (元本宗源神道). He further claimed the Gempon-sōgen Shintō passed down by his own family was the only true Shinto transmitted since the very origin of the country. He also placed the kami as the peak of all things, and Shinto as the origin of all things. In regard to the relationship between Shinto, Confucianism, and Buddhism, he strongly purported a root-leaf-fruit theory which claimed Shinto was the roots, Confucianism was the leaves that grew in China, and Buddhism was the fruit which blossomed in India. This argued that while the three religions were one, Shinto was the true religion.

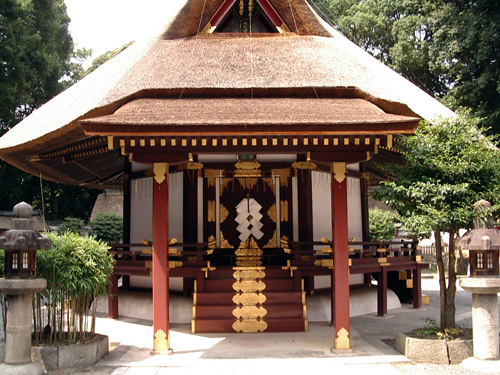
Yoshida Shrine in Sakyo-ku, Kyoto City

Additionally, he claimed Shinto had three aspects: the body, its true essence, the appearance, how it manifests, and the purpose, how it affects the world. These three aspects govern the sun and the moon, the warmth and the cold, nature, and all other phenomena. Ultimately, his Shinto theory was a type of pantheism in that he claimed the kami resided within all things in existence, permeating the entire universe. In addition to his theories of Shinto, Kanemoto developed many rituals. He began by building the Daigengū Saijōsho (大元宮斎場所) at Yoshida Shrine. This enshrined the kami of Ise Shrine, the Hasshinden, and the more than 3,000 kami of the Engishiki shrines. He then declared the Daigengū to be the root of all religion in Japan from the time of its founding, as well as the main shrine for all shrines throughout the country. Furthermore, with influence from esoteric Buddhism, he created three rituals known collectively as the Three Dais Rituals (三壇行事, San Dan Gyōji). These included the Eighteen Shinto Rituals (十八神道行事, Jūhachi Shintō Gyōji), the Sōgen Shinto Ritual (宗源神道行事, Sōgen Shintō Gyōji), and a homa ritual which consisted of lighting a fire in the octagonal dais in the center of the hearth then praying as grains and rice porridge were cast into the fire.

These Shinto theories were purported to have been developed based on a collection of three writings known as the Three Sacred Scriptures (三部の神経) which include Tengen Shinpen Shinmyō-kei (天元神変神妙経), Jimoto Jintsū Shinmyō-kei (地元神通神妙経), and Jingen Jinryoku Shinmyō-kei (人元神力神妙経). These scriptures are said to contain the teachings of Ame-no-Koyane, however, they are considered fictitious as there is no evidence they were ever created. Kanemoto himself fabricated writings resembling these scriptures under the names of other authors, such as Fujiwara no Kamatari. He also fabricated the history of the Daigengū Saijōsho.

Yoshida Shinto also established the ceremony for Shinto funerals in which people are worshipped as kami. There had been little engagement with funerals prior to this as Shinto viewed death as impure, and it was only when appeasing vengeful spirits through worship such as in the case of goryō or Tenjin that people could be considered kami. Yoshida Shinto, however, held a belief in a close relationship between people and kami and thus actively conducted funerals. In fact, the Kamitatsu Shrine (神龍社) was constructed above Kanemoto's remains and became a shrine housing him as a kami.

Yoshida Shinto became an emerging force, with its rise perhaps contributed to by the societal unrest caused by the warring of the period. The sect spread widely, particularly among the upper class with Hino Tomiko's patronage of the Daigengū upon its construction as well as an imperial sanction in 1473, allowing it to become central to the Shinto sphere in the modern era. However, it also received strong resistance, such as from the priests of both the Inner and Outer Shrines of Ise Shrine.

Yoshida Shinto is the first Shinto theory to have its own doctrines, scriptures, and rituals independent of Buddhism while amalgamating Shinto from the Middle Ages and reaching across religious lines to incorporate discourse from various religions. Several scholars consider the establishment of Yoshida Shinto a turning point in the religion's history, such as Shinto scholar Shōji Okada who called it a transitional period for Shinto, and historian Toshio Kuroda who claims the creation of Yoshida Shinto was the creation of Shinto itself.

Having established Shinto funerals, Yoshida Shinto went on in the Sengoku period to become involved with the founding of shrines which worshipped the daimyo of the time as kami, including the founding of the Toyokuni Shrine in Kyoto, in which Toyotomi Hideyoshi was enshrined as a kami. Additionally, Bonshun of the Yoshida family recited Shinto prayers for Tokugawa Ieyasu and conducted Ieyasu's Shinto funeral upon his death in accordance with his will.

== Early modern times ==
=== The Shogunate's Restoration of the Shinto System and Imperial Rites ===
The administration of shrines was restructured once the Edo period began after the end of the wartime of the Sengoku period. The Shogunate officially recognized the territory controlled at the time by each shrine and granted them the right to refuse entry to shugo and their officials. Those regions that received this directly from the Shogun were referred to as red-seal lands (朱印地, shuin-chi) while those who received it from the regional lord were called black-seal lands (黒印状, kokuin-chi). However, being acknowledged in this way meant the shrine's right to profit and to own land was given to the Shogunate. The Shogunate also established the Jisha Bugyō (寺社奉行; lit. "temple and shrine commissioner") position which was placed at the top of the three Tokugawa bugyō positions under Rōjū authority (the other two bugyō it was above being the Machi Bugyō and Kanjō bugyō). The Shintō-kata (神道方) position was also established as an advisory role to the Jisha Bugyō who they reported to. They were responsible for researching ancient Shinto practices and ceremony documents. This position became hereditary within the Yoshikawa family following Yoshikawa Kikkawa's service in the position. Special bugyō positions were also assigned to select shrines such as the Yamada Bugyō (山田奉行) which oversaw Ise Shrine and the Nikkō Bugyō (日光奉行) which oversaw Nikkō Tōshō-gū.

In 1665, the Shogunate enacted the Regulations Governing Shintō Shrines, Senior Priests and Other Shrine Functionaries (諸社禰宜神主法度, Shosha negi kannushi hatto) which gave the Yoshida family almost complete control over all clergy members including requiring general clergy members without a court rank to receive a Shintō Sai Kyojō (神道裁許状; lit. "Shinto Function Certificate") from the Yoshida family before wearing kiriginu (狩衣) or ikan (衣冠). However, shrines which received court status previously from the Imperial Court such as Ise Shrine, the Kamo shrines, Kasuga-taisha, Usa Jingū, Izumo-taisha, and Fushimi Inari-taisha were allowed to operate through the Shaji Tensō (寺社伝奏; lit. "Imperial Liaison for Temples and Shrines") as they had in the past rather than through the Yoshida family. This law also instated a punishment for neglect of duties for those in the clergy, prohibited the buying and selling of shrine territory, and stipulated a duty to maintain the shrines.

With the creation of the Shūmon Ninbetsuaratame-chō (宗門人別改帳; lit. "Denomination Census Ledger"), the Shogunate required all funerals to be held at the family's registered temple in what was known as the danka system (檀家制度, danka seido), essentially requiring all common people to have Buddhist funerals. Some people, such as the Yoshida family and family of hereditary priest lines at influential temples, were allowed Shinto funerals with approval of the Jisha Bugyō. This restriction was relaxed in the mid-Edo period as the anti-danka movement developed, allowing those who had agreed with their registered temple to receive a Shintō-sai Kyojō (神道裁許状; lit. "Shinto Rite Approval Certificate") and have a Shinto funeral. When this happened, the shrine rather than the temple confirmed the person was not Christian and issued what was called a Shinto certificate (神道請, Shintō-uke) rather than a temple certificate (寺請, tera-uke) of affiliation.

The Shogunate also provided financial support for the partial revival of imperial rites which had been suspended during the warring period. The Daijōsai—which had been suspended for 222 years ever since the ascension of Emperor Go-Tsuchimikado—was revived for Emperor Higashiyama and then made permanent at the ascension of Emperor Sakuramachi. The Niinamesai was also revived in 1688, the year following the year the Daijōsai was restored. The practice of sending heihaku ritual offerings from the emperor to select shrines also restarted during this time with heihaku delivered to the Upper Seven Shrines, Usa Jingū, Kashii-gū in 1744. Reihei (例幣) offerings which were sent from the imperial court for the Kannamesai were also reinstated in 1647 by order of Emperor Go-Kōmyō. Ise Shrine's ritual rebuilding process called the Shikinen Sengū had also been discontinued but was also revived during the Azuchi–Momoyama period through the combined efforts of Buddhist nuns Seijun and Shūyō of Keikō-in Temple. While the Department of Divinities, which was burned in the warring period, was not restored, the Hasshinden in the Saijōsho of Yoshida Shrine did take its place.

The Shogunate also instated regulations in regards to Shugendō with the enactment of the Regulations Governing Shugendō (修験道法度, Shugendō Happa) in 1613 forbidding any not affiliated with either the Tōzan Sect or the Honzan Sect from mountain ascetic practices. This caused Shugendō practitioners to split into two groups: those who resided in the mountains, and those who resided in settlements practicing what was called sato-shugen (里修験; lit. "village shugen"). It was these latter Shugendō practitioners who filled a role of guiding the common people in their folk beliefs, such as in the practice of Kōshin.

=== Popular beliefs in the early modern era ===
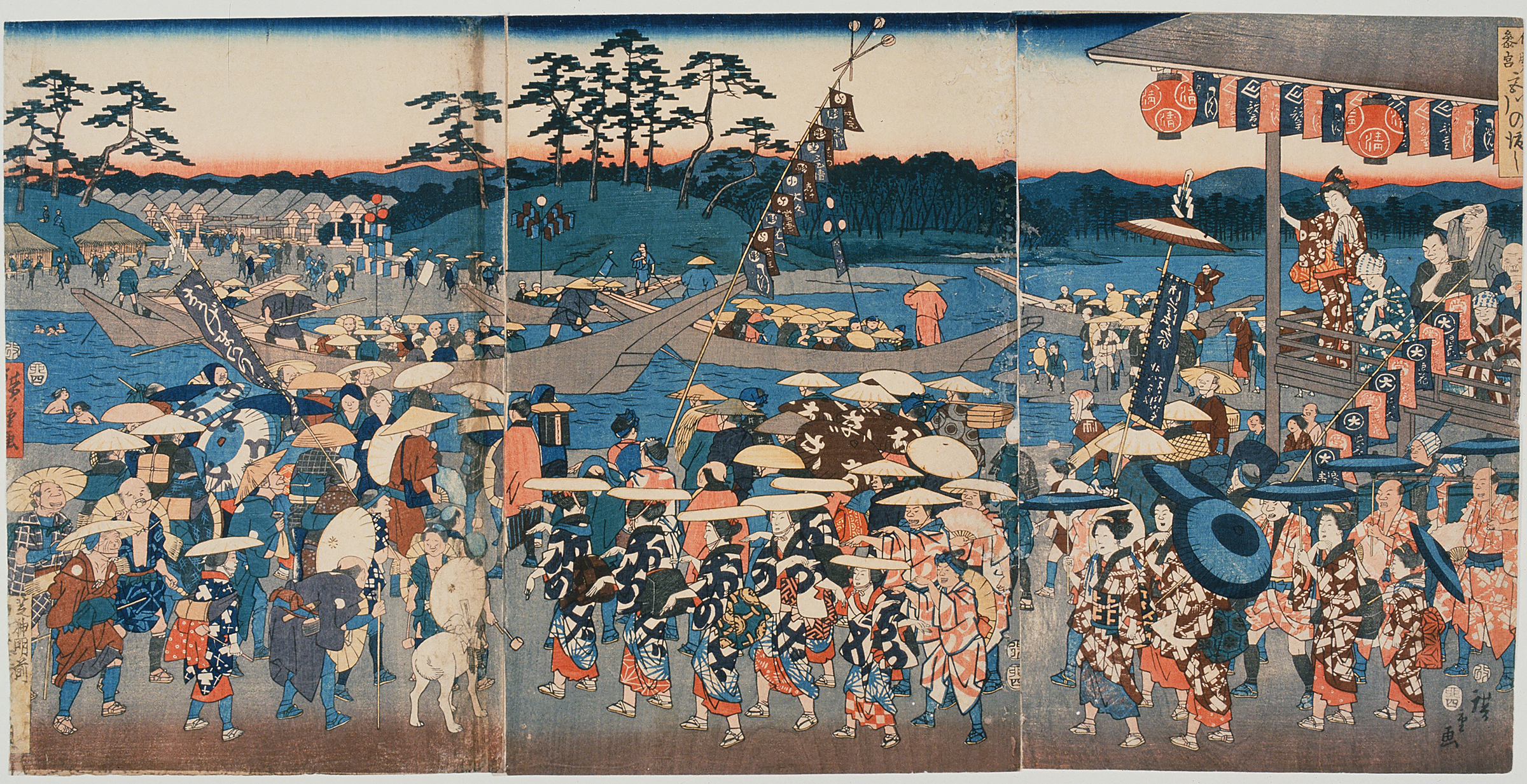
Utagawa Hiroshige "Ferryboats to the Ise Shrine on the Miyagawa River"

Following the early modern period, the Shinto faith spread more throughout the common class due to the recovery of societal stability and improvements in travel, such as with the construction of the kaidō road system and establishment of shukuba station towns along them. Throughout the land, people formed associations called kō (講). Particularly widespread were daisan-kō (代参講) in which the association gathered a modest sum of money from the members every year and selected one member by lottery to travel to the shrine where they collected each member's ofuda from the shrine. Other associations spread across the country which traveled to specific prominent shrines such as the Ise-kō (伊勢講) which went to Ise Shrine, the Fujisan-kō which went to Fujisan Hongū Sengen Taisha, Konbira-kō, Inari-kō, and Akiha-kō. Each association formed a relationship with an oshi (御師) or a sendatsu (先達) guide who would arrange lodging for when the pilgrim(s) came for prayers or to visit the shrine.

Faith in Ise Shinto in particular saw a strong surge during this period. Oshi of Ise Shrine proselytized through traveling priests who visited one to three times a year by giving them Jingū taima or copies of the Ise calendar (伊勢暦, Ise koyomi) to give out, along with regional products such as a type of cosmetic called Ise oshiroi (伊勢おしろい) or Ise tea. The oshi also invited visitors to their own homes and treated them to kagura performances, alcohol, Ise delicacies, and down quilts in addition to providing tours to the Inner and Outer Shrines of Ise or famous historical sites to allow visitors to fully experience the much-desired visit to Ise Shrine. All of this led to increased following of the Ise Faith by the people, with the okagemairi (お蔭参り) occurring several times in the Edo period in which millions of visitors traveled to Ise Shrine at once. Over 90% of households across Japan had an Ise ofuda in their home.

Many guidebooks were published during this period as visits to shrines became more common among the people. Several were published that catalogued temples and shrines across the country and introduced them to the people such as Edo Meisho Zue (江戸名所図会; Guide to Famous Edo Sites) by Saitō Gesshin, Edoshinbutsu Gankake Chōhōki (江戸神仏願懸重宝記; Handy Guide to Shinto and Buddhist Worship in Edo) by Kobei Namiki, and Edo Meisho Hanagoyomi (江戸名所絵花暦; Illustrated Floral Calendar of Famous Edo Sites) by Sanchō Oka. Furthermore, the popularity of Jippensha Ikku’s Tōkaidōchū Hizakurige about a misadventure-filled journey to Ise Shrine influenced other works, leading to literature centered on stories of pilgrimages to Ise such as the genre of comedic novels (滑稽本, kokkeibon) called hizakurigemono (膝栗毛もの), and this also contributed to the people's faith in Ise Shinto.

In contrast, as non-religious visits to shrines and temples became more frequent, entertainment providers began to operate outside the temple or shrine, or even within its grounds, including licensed red-light districts (遊廓, yūkaku), unlicensed prostitutes, outdoor performances, and impersonation artists. Edo-period writer and critic Buyō Inshi wrote a critique of the state of temple and shrine visits in the Sejiken Bunroku (世事見聞録), stating, "The area just outside the gates of temples and shrines has become a land of debauchery."

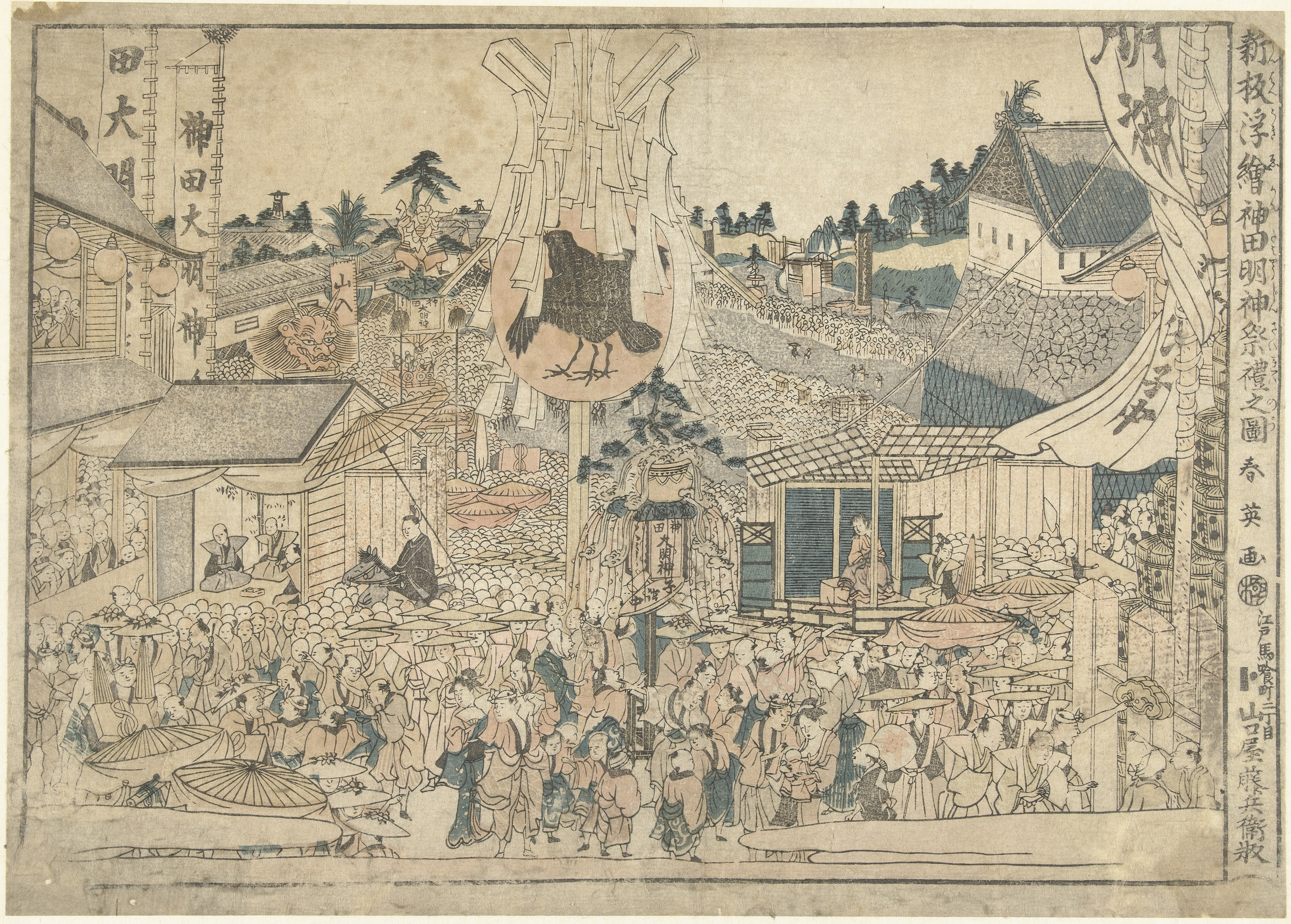
Katsukawa Shun'ei's work Shinpan Uki-e Kanda Myojin Sairei no Zu (新板浮絵神田明神祭礼之図)

In addition to this increase in visitors to shrines, festivals for urban commoners grew as non-locals attended festivals even if they were not worshippers of that kami. Examples of festivals that saw expansion include Sannō Matsuri of Hie Shrine (one of the Three Edo Great Festivals (江戸三大祭り, Edo San Daimatsuri)), Nezu Festival of Nezu Shrine, and Kanda Matsuri of Kanda Shrine. Spectators were drawn to the festivals to see the ornately crafted stalls and floats in competition with each other or parades costumed as Korean delegations or a daimyo's procession. Festivals grew in many other cities as well, such as with Gion Festival and Imamiya Matsuri of Kyoto, Tenjin Matsuri of Osaka, Hiyoshi Sannō Matsuri of Shiga, Chichibu Night Festival of Saitama, and Takayama Festival of Gifu. Some of these festivals had been passed down through the ages since before this period, but many of them were restarted thanks to the improved social stability of the early modern period.

Urban festivals fell into two categories in terms of their financial sourcing: those financed primarily by the local lord, and those financed by the townsfolk. When financed by the lord, the lord would require townspeople to fill labor requirements such as in preparing the roads and breeding divine horses (神馬, shinme), as well as had them participate in the festival as float bearers. When the people financed the festival, an organizer called a tōya (頭屋) was selected and they would either bear the financial burden or share it with the town. While the lords did issue expenditure regulations in these cases, they otherwise provided the people freedom in running the festival.

As the number of Shinto followers increased amongst the common people, lecturers appeared that provided education to the common people through oral talks. Masuho Zankō of Asahi Shinmei-gū Shrine was one such people and delivered talks in a clever and humorous style. His was not an academic style of Shinto that sought its foundation in scriptures but rather drew freely from the three religions of Shinto, Buddhism, and Confucianism to apply Shinto to problems both spiritual and practical. He preached of a morality applicable to the commoner such as harmony between husband and wife and equality between men and women, and taught a fundamental principle of Shinto was that people should strive to live up to their standing, all of which were teachings commoners sought as they lived in a status-based society.

The religious education activities of these lecturers influenced the Shinto followers of the next era. Masakane Inoue, a clergy member of Umeda Shinmei Shrine, established the Misogikyō sect of Shinto and taught the practice of chōsoku (調息), proper breathing, and of reciting the Sanju-no-Ōharae (三種祓) while leaving one's fate in the hands of the kami. He gained many followers this way, but the shogunate grew suspicious of him and he was banished to Miyakejima. Kurozumikyō was another sect established by Kurozumi Munetada, a clergy member of Imamura-gū Shrine in which he taught all were one with Amaterasu regardless of social class, teachings which spread widely across the different social ranks.

Additionally, Ishida Baigan, founder of Sekimon-shingaku which would become the largest sect among the populace in the early modern period, was influence by these Shinto lecturers in his youth, leading him to place an emphasis on the medieval Shinto virtue of honesty as he found harmony between the teachings of Shinto, Buddhism, and Confucianism to express concepts to the common people and merchant class.

In the late Edo period, Ninomiya Sontoku preached his hōtoku shisō (報徳思想; gratitude mentality) which consisted of the four principles of sincerity, diligence, economy (living within one's means), and service (giving to others) as "the great path of genesis" and "the great path of Shinto" as Amaterasu had opened Toyoashihara (豊葦原; the field of abundant reeds) in the form of the land of Mizuho. He described his own teachings as an amalgamation of Shinto, Buddhism, and Confucianism with a good helping of Shinto and dashes of Buddhism and Confucianism.

=== The establishment of Confucian Shinto ===
During the Edo period, while Buddhism held a state religion-like status under the terauke system, it stagnated intellectually as a whole. In the intellectual sphere, Confucianism, particularly the Cheng–Zhu school, flourished greatly as it was effective as an ideology to support the shogun-daimyo system and preached ethics suitable for the secularism of the Edo period. Buddhism, with its rejection of worldly matters, faced much criticism from Confucianists who saw it as incompatible with secular ethics.

In tandem with the rise of Cheng–Zhu Confucianism, mainstream Shinto theories shifted from Shinto-Buddhism syncretism to Confucian Shinto. While there were Shinto theories advocated for by the Yangmingism faction, such as those from Nakae Tōju's Taikyo Shinto (太虚神道, Taikyo Shintō)], most of these Shinto theories were formed by those in the Cheng–Zhu school. Although Confucian thought was also incorporated into Shinto-Buddhism syncretised ideology, Confucian Shinto differed in that it explicitly criticized Buddhism and sought to break away from its influence. At the same time, Confucian Shinto's logical structure was heavily influenced by medieval esoteric traditions in such a way that the Buddhist theories of Shinto-Buddhism syncretism were replaced with Cheng–Zhu Confucianism theories such that it could be said this was a transition period between the Middle Ages and the early modern period.

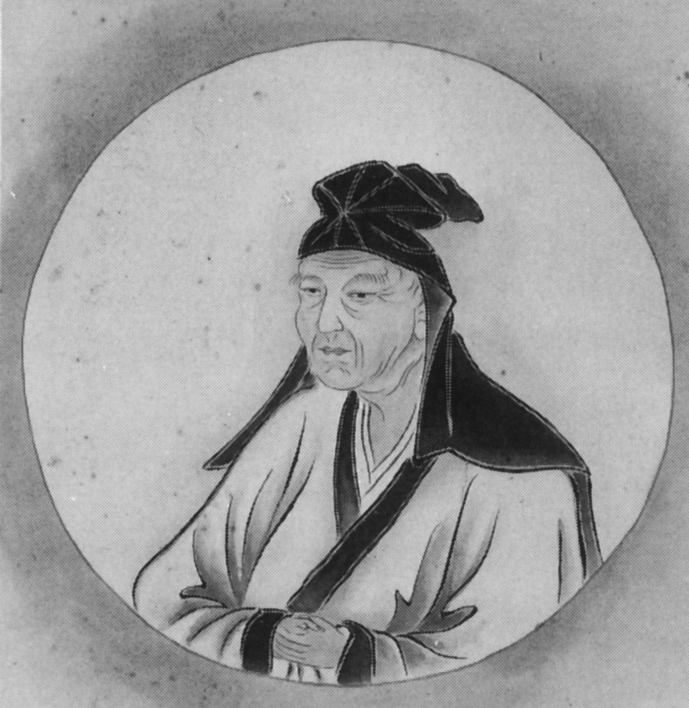
Hayashi Razan, a pioneer of Confucian Shinto

The forerunner of Confucian Shinto was Hayashi Razan. As Hayashi spread Cheng–Zhu Confucianism knowledge throughout Japan, he studied Shinto, wrote Shintō Denshū (神道伝授; "The Transmission of Shinto") and Honchō Jinjakō (本朝神社考; "An Examination of the Shrines of our Realm"), and formed his own Shinto theory known as Ritō Shinchi Shinto. According to his ideology, the Confucian concept of Li was one in the same with Shinto's kami, and Li's ultimate manifestation was the kami Kuni-no-Tokotachi, which effectively merged Confucianism's Li with Shinto's kami. Furthermore, Hayashi advocated for the idea of Japan as a divine land and criticized Buddhism with claims that pre-Buddhism Japan was superior and purer. Additionally, using a lens of Sinocentricism, he claimed Emperor Jimmu was a descendent of Taibo and the Three Sacred Treasures were an expression of Confucianism's Three Vitues, and therefore Japan had long belonged to the Sinosphere which was why Japan had such an advanced civilization. He also claimed Shinto was in fact a political system given to the emperor by Amaterasu and handed down through the generations, called the rituals of the average shrine and festivals held by the people "Shinto of witchcraft and plays", and rejected those who practiced them as mere actors.

Changes were seen in Yoshida Shinto as well. Yoshikawa Koretari (吉川惟足), a merchant at the time, joined the Yoshida family and was made the official successor by the head of the Yoshida family, Hagiwara Kaneyori. Yoshikawa removed Buddhist discourse from Yoshida Shinto and added in a significant amount of Confucian discourse, creating Yoshikawa Shinto. Beliefs of Yoshikawa Shinto included, foremost, that Shinto was the source of all things, as well as that Kuni-no-Tokotachi presided over the entire world, and that that world and humans within it were created by the kami, which were one in the same with the Confucian concept of Li. Because of this, the human body was certain to contain Li, making humans fundamentally one with the kami. However, humans’ divine wisdom was clouded by impurity, and they must return to their natural form through self-restraint. Specific methods for which this was accomplished was purification of the self, both inside and out, demonstrations of sincerity through the conducting of rituals, and praying to the kami. It was also believed that Confucianism's Five Great Relationships were a duty given to humanity by the kami, with the ruler-subjects relationship being of particular importance.

Even Ise Shinto saw the rejection of Buddhist teachings and adoption of Confucian philosophy in the early Edo period through the priest Deguchi Nobuyoshi to form Late Ise Shinto (後期伊勢神道, Kōki Ise Shintō). Deguchi wrote several works on Shinto theory including Daijingū Shintō Wakumon (太神宮神道或問; "Answering Questions of the Shinto of the Great Shrine") and Yōbuku-ki (陽復記; "Record of the Winter Solstice") in which he stated the true nature of Shinto was a path that was only natural for the Japanese people to take for their daily lives, an everyday path for carrying out one's duty with an honest and pure heart. He argued one must keep the kami in mind during every moment of their daily lives, from moving their limbs to eating and drinking, and that it was wrong to think of Shinto as simply reciting prayers or holding a tamagushi at a shrine's ritual. While he did admit that, ultimately, all religions are a common and universal path which align with each other and that Shinto and Confucianism in particular had many aspects in common, he argued that the governmental systems and cultural practices of each country are different and the Japanese people should respect Japanese law and customs. Therefore, he argued it was wrong to use Confucianism and Buddhism for the purpose of creating a syncretized system. He claimed that while he did use Confucianism himself, it was only because it naturally had commonalities with Shinto. He was not attempting to force a merging of the two religions. He also went on to say that there was nothing wrong with studying Confucianism or Buddhism so long as one's central focus was on Shinto, and that it was against the natural progression of things, and therefore unaligned with Shinto, to ban Confucianism or Buddhism or eliminate current customs with some claim they were harmful.

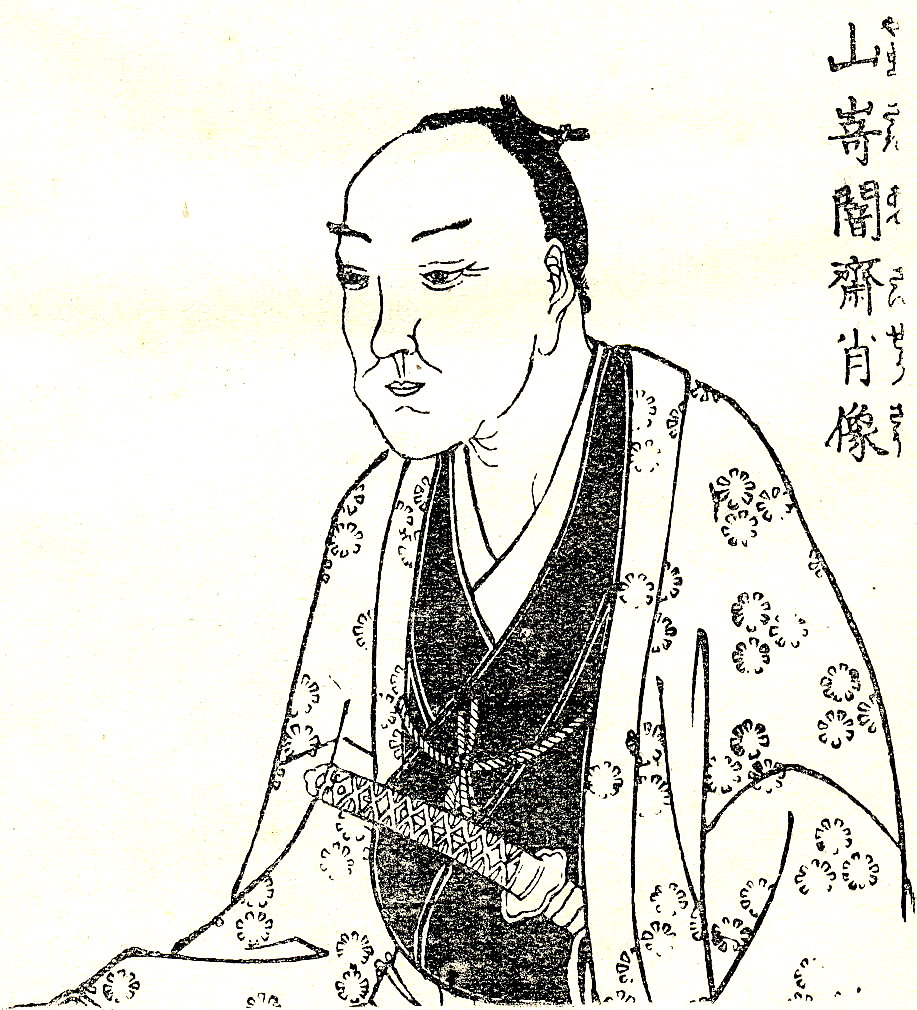
Yamazaki Ansai, who compiled Confucian-Shinto thought

These Confucian Shinto theories were compiled by Yamazaki Ansai. After making a name for himself as a Confucianist, Yamazaki was employed by Hoshina Masayuki, the daimyō of the Aizu Domain, where he met Yoshikawa Koretari, who was also a tutor for Hoshino, and learned Yoshikawa Shinto. This resulted in Yamazaki creating his own form of Shinto, Suika Shinto (垂加神道, Suika Shintō). Suika Shinto linked the Neo-Confucian school of Cheng-zhu to the Kamiyo-nanayo kami and identified Kuni-no-Tokotachi as the Confucian concept of taiji. He also claimed the five kami born after Kuni-no-Tokotachi were the Five Agents of wuxing, and the final kami created of those, Izanami and Izanagi, brought together the Five Agents to create the earth, the kami, and humans. The spirits of these kami that created humanity also reside within humans, and humans and kami together are united as one in the "sole way of heaven and man". In addition, he stated Shinto was the way in which humans live in accordance with the kami, that humans must receive divine protection from the kami through prayer, and that they must be honest in that prayer. The most important thing for achieving that honesty was the Confucian concept of jing. Similarly to Yoshikawa Shinto, there was a strong focus on the ruler-subjects relationship. The ruler-subjects relationship was not seen as one of opposition or power, but rather that rulers and subjects were one unified group, and a true ruler-subjects relationship in Shinto was the one which had long protected Japan through the two protecting each other. The relationship between the sovereign and the vassal is not one of rivalry or power, but one of unity, and the sovereign and the vassal have protected the country through their mutual protection. This had a significant impact on later attitudes of reverence towards the emperor.

After Yamazaki Ansai's death, his pupil Ōgimachi Kinmichi succeeded him, and Suika Shinto flourished, spreading across Japan from its focal points in Edo and Kyoto where it was widely taken up by the nobility, warrior class, and priesthood and became the greatest influence in the Shinto world. After Ōgimachi's death, his pupil Tamaki Masahide succeeded him and systemized his one, two, three, and fourfold secret teachings which placed his writings in the Jijushō (持授抄) as the ultimate great mystery. In addition to his systemization of Suika Shinto, he created his own Shinto theory, Kikke Shinto. This move of transforming Suika Shinto thought into secret teachings was criticized by some, such as Kawabayashi Kyōsai, as they felt it obscured Yamazaki Ansai's original intentions.

Forms of Shinto passed down by families were also influenced by Suika Shinto leading to a widespread move to create doctrines for and systemize them. Examples of Shinto influenced in this way include Kikke Shinto, as mentioned previously, as well as Hakke Shinto (伯家神道, Hakke Shintō) of the Shirakawa clan and Tsuchimikado Shinto, a form of Onmyōdo Shinto.

One of Tamaki Masahide's pupils, Yoshimi Yukikazu, wrote the Gōbusho Setsuben (五部書説弁; "An Explanation of the Gōbusho") and provided grounds to argue that Shintō Gōbusho were fake writings of the Middle Ages while also criticizing Ise Shinto and Yoshida Shinto in addition to Suika Shinto, which used the Shintō Gōbusho as its central texts. During this period, Yoshimi become a pupil of Keichū. This transition reflected a trend of the times in which mainstream Shinto theory shifted from Suika Shinto to kokugaku. In fact, Suika Shinto theory began to stagnate after Tamaki Masahide and was overtaken by kokugaku as the primary theory.

In conjunction with this trend of anti-Buddhist ideology, a movement to separate Buddhism and Shinto spread through a portion of the daimyo. Tokugawa Mitsukuni of the Mito Domain conducted an investigation into the history of those shrines with particularly significant signs of Shinto-Buddhist syncretism and consolidated or closed shrines in such a way as to eliminate these Buddhist aspects. Hoshina Masayuki of the Aizu Domain also did similar consolidation. Ikeda Mitsumasa of the Okayama Domain encouraged Buddhist monks from the Fuju-fuse subsect of Nichiren and the combined schools of Tendai and Shingon to renounce their vows, while at the same time reducing the number of temples and recommending Shinto funeral ceremonies over the standard Buddhist ones of the time. In 1647, Matsudaira Naomasa, leader of the Matsue Domain, led Izumo-taisha, a shrine which had been influenced by Suika Shinto, in eliminating all Buddhist element.

=== Development of kokugaku ===
The kokugaku field of academic thought began to flourish during the mid-Edo period in place of Confucian Shinto. While the origin of kokugaku can be seen in the poems of Kinoshita Chōshōshi, Kise Sanshi, Toda Mosui, Shimokōbe Chōryū, Kitamura Kigin and other poets of the early-Edo period who rejected the Middle Ages-style poetry norms, it was the monk Keichū who disseminated and provided philological annotations for this poetry. Keichū travelled from temple to temple as he dedicated himself to the study of Japanese literature. His writings, including Man'yō Daishōki (万葉代匠記) and Waji Shōranshō (和字正濫鈔), are achievements in the empirical study of poetry and the study of the use of hiragana, which established a method for researching Japanese classical texts empirically rather than through a lens of Buddhist or Confucian doctrine.

Keichū was succeeded by Kada no Azumamaro who was born into the Higashi-Hakura family who served as priests at Fushimi Inari-taisha. He later moved to Edo to lecture. While Azumamaro did not officially become Keichū's pupil, his collections of texts included many works written by Keichū such as his Man'yō Daishōki. Azumamaro's own annotation work on the Man'yōshū, his Man'yōshū Hekianshō (万葉集僻案抄), also imitates large sections of Keichū's arguments, making it clear he was heavily influenced by Keichū's work. As can be seen in Azumamaro's Sōgakkōkei (創学校啓), he intended to systemize the study of history, theology, and customs of the ruling classes into one academic school he called wagaku (和学). It was he that began to integrate Shinto and language research (through Keichū and other related scholars) into the school of kokugaku.

Kamo no Mabuchi was born into a branch of the Kamo clan, the family which inherited the position as priests at the Kamo shrines, and studied under Sugiura Kuniakira and other pupils of Azumamaro. He later travelled to Edo and studied directly under Azumamaro and became a prominent kokugaku scholar after Azumamaro's death where he became employed by Tokugawa Munetake on recommendation of Kada no Arimaro. Mabuchi also studied the Man’yōshū, part of which included his research into ritual incantations called norito, and wrote annotated texts such as his Manyō-kō (万葉考; "A Study of the Man'yōshū"), Kanji-kō (冠辞考; "A Study of Makurakotoba"), and Norito-kō (祝詞考; "A Study of Norito"). Additionally, after presenting a systematic methodology for expanding from the study of ancient language to ancient ideals and ways in his Kokui-kō (国意考; "A Study of National Thought"), Mabuchi added into kokugaku philosophy an anti-Confucian view that valued the Japan of old. His philosophy argued that it was in fact because Confucianism preached morality that it caused strife, whereas ancient Japan had its naoki-kokoro (直き心; "honest heart") which was a convergence of reverence for the two great concepts of the kami and the emperor, which innately calms society without preaching on morality. To achieve this spirit of ancient Japan, one must study the poetry of the Man’yoshū and practice composing one's own poetry. The composition of poetry is itself the essence of kokugaku. However, Mabuchi only touched briefly on the contents of this ancient path, only in his comparisons between it and Confucian ethics. He did speak of its similarities with Toaism, but he never directly drew a system of philosophy from ancient Japanese texts or developed kokugaku into a systemized theology.

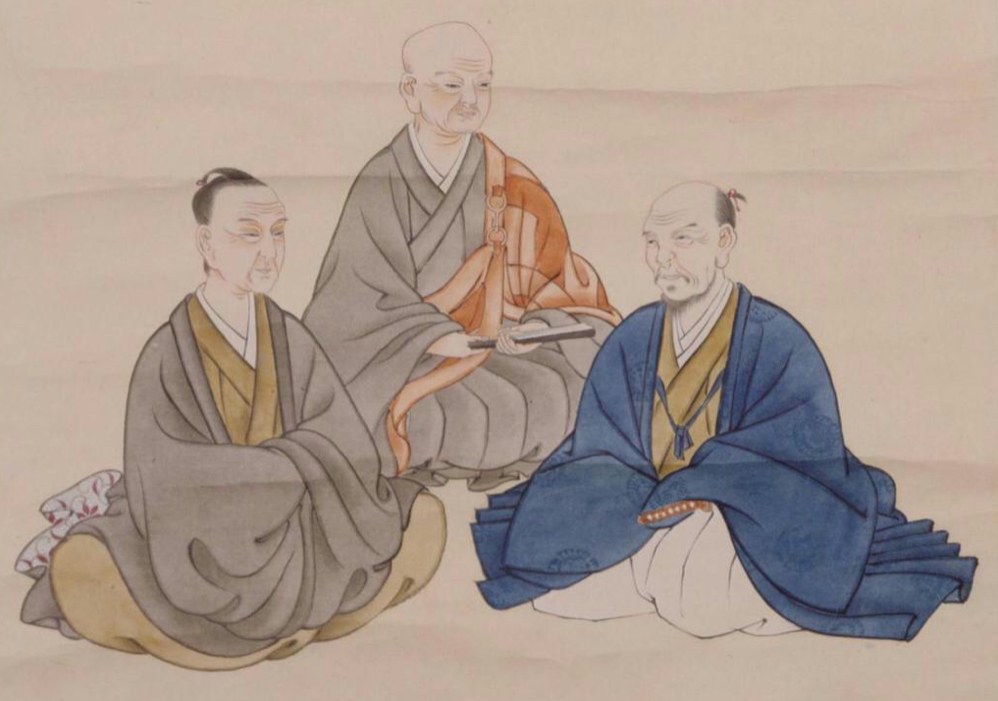
The Three Kokugaku Philosophers. From left to right, Motoori Norinaga, Keichū, and Kamo no Mabuchi

Mabuchi was followed by Motoori Norinaga who grew kokugaku. Norinaga was born into a merchant family and had an interest in studying Japanese classics and poetry alongside his study of medicine. He continued his dedicated study of kokugaku while practicing medicine. He met Mabuchi and became his pupil when he was 34 where he would remain to study until Mabuchi's death. In addition to continuing the literary and linguistic studies began by Keichū, Norinaga significantly developed Shinto theology within kokugaku. He argued that Confucianism with its preaching of morality was a false path created by Confucian sages to control the people, and when they claimed a country was difficult to rule due to improper customs, it was in fact an attempt to rule with force. He also criticized Confucianism for Heaven always supporting the sages as well as the Mandate of Heaven, which determines the Son of Heaven, for being simply a method for allowing one to justify oneself as the king of stolen lands. In contrast, Japan had since ancient times never had teachings like Confucianism and Buddhism, yet the descendants of Amaterasu had continued to rule over the country despite this lack of paltry wisdom, with the imperial line running unbroken with no chaos whatsoever. Evidence he gave in support of this was that Japan had never seen a change in dynasties, while China, which had the teachings of Confucianism, had seen the ruler killed and replaced several times. He went on to criticize Confucian and Buddhist Shinto for their interpretations of Shinto through Buddhist or Confucian doctrine, arguing that scholars must not interpret Shinto texts with such Sinocentric philosophy and should instead conduct empirical research.

Norinaga also argued that the philosophy of the Cheng-Zhu school of neo-Confucianism which stated the world is composed of yin and yang, and li and qi was nothing more than an unfounded theory the sages created through mere speculation. He also criticized Taoism and its view that the universe exists "by itself and of itself", instead saying that all phenomena of the universe are governed by the kami. The reason why bad things happen in a world governed by the kami is due to the work of the evil kami, Magatsuhi-no-kami. Additionally, he viewed myths as facts and claimed it was disrespecting the kami to attempt to explain existence's workings with logic such as in the theory of li and qi, and instead developed an agnostic theory which claimed these things were beyond the scope of human comprehension.

Norinaga received criticism for his theology in which myths were seen as truth, even from his fellow kokugaku scholars. Fujitani Matsue criticized Norinaga's annotation of the Kojiki, arguing that the words of myths and poems were not like every day language but were rather kotodama, words of power, that represented something other than what they appeared to represent and therefore should be taken not as fact but understood as scripture. His theology was also criticized by Tachibana Moribe and Murata Harumi.

After Norinaga, each kokugaku scholar became more specialized in their field of study. The linguistics and philology side of Norinaga's study was taken up by Ban Nobutomo, Motoori Ōhira, and Motoori Haruniwa, whereas Norinaga's "pupil after death" Hirata Atsutane focused primarily on his study of the ancient ways and theology.

=== Restoration Shinto and Late Mitogaku ===
Japan saw significant changes at the beginning of the late Edo period, such as in the repeated attacks from foreign ships, and a new Shinto philosophy was born in the midst of these changing social conditions.

In the 18th century and prior to that, "Shinto had moved away from its roots as a cult of nature worship to become intertwined with Buddhism and Confucianism." In the 1730, Kada Azumamaro, Kamo Mabuchi, and their followers wanted to create a new Shinto that restored what they saw as traditional, indigenous Japanese practices and "ancient rites".

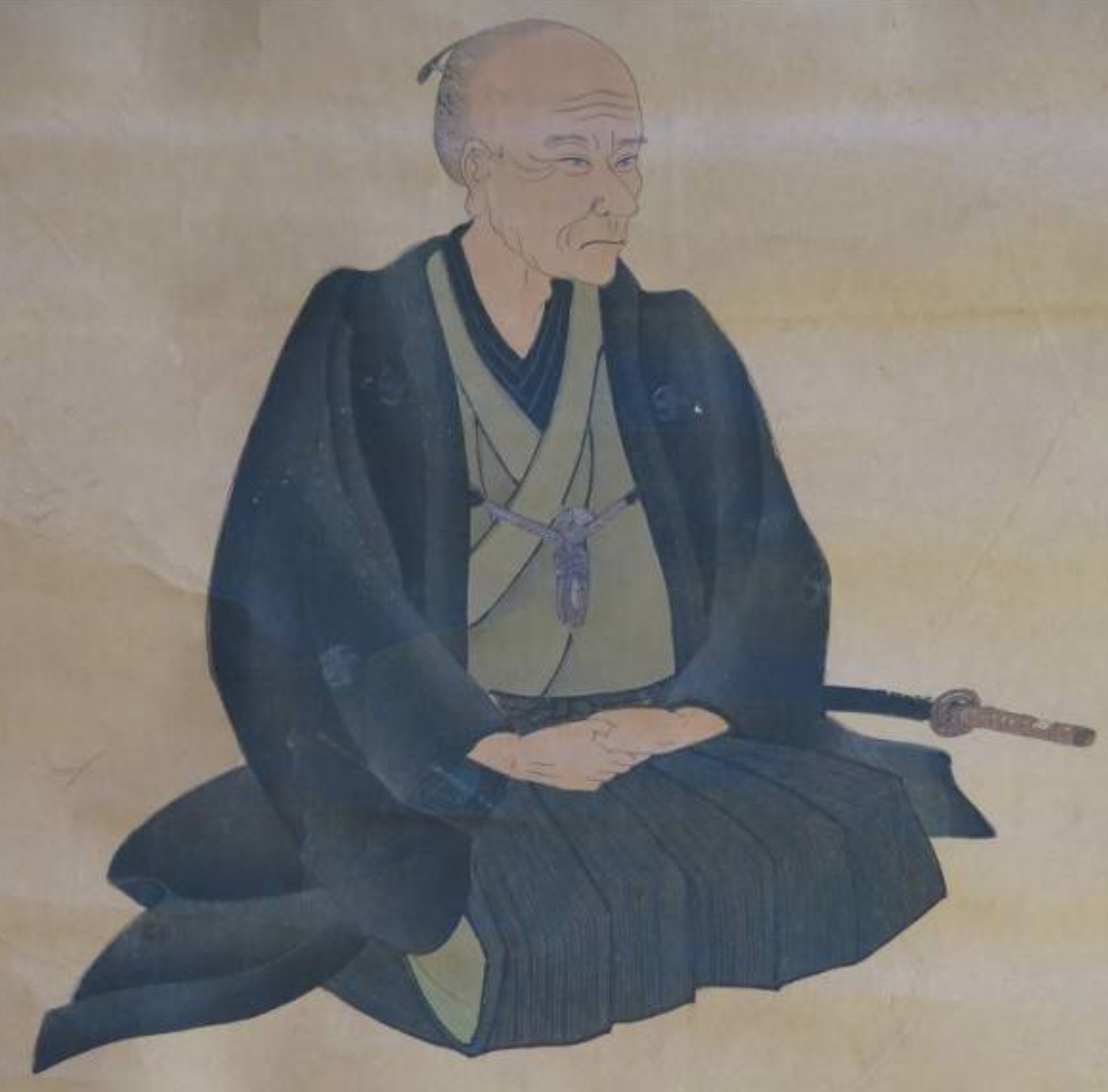
Hirata Atsutane

Hirata Atsutane, who referred to himself as the “pupil after death” of Motoori Norinaga after being visited by him in a dream, wrote several works including Tama no Mihashira (霊の真柱; "True Pillar of the Spirit"), Koshiden (古史伝; "Commentary on Ancient History"), and Honkyō Gaihen (本教外篇; "Outer Chapters of Our Doctrine") and organized a new type of Shinto called Fukko Shinto while adopting Norinaga's theology though he was critical of some aspects. Atsutane stated that in order for one to cultivate a Yamato spirit, one must know where the spirit goes, and his ideology placed an emphasis on the world after death, claiming that the current world we live in is a false world kept in existence by Ōkuninushi in order to evaluate an individual's virtue. He believed the universe was formed of three aspects—heaven, earth, and yomi—and rejected the Shinto belief that people go to yomi after death. Instead, he claimed that upon death, one's spirit travels to Ōkuninushi's yūmeikai (幽冥界; lit. "gloom world") located within the earth aspect, and Ōkuninushi would judge the person on their deeds in life there. Yūmeikai was a land ruled over by Ōkuninushi, located alongside the Kotoamatsukami, and was the counterpart to the kenmeikai (顕明界; lit. "bright world") ruled by the emperor. As the yūmeikai was still in earth, the spirits of the dead who had gone there were able to watch over those still living. This was applying an explanation to long-held Japanese views on the nature of the soul and also provided a theoretical underpinning for Shinto funerals. He also claimed the myths of all countries, from Chinese and Indian mythology, to even the story of Adam and Eve in Christianity were in fact altered versions of Japanese myths simply expressing the same truths in different words. It is believed that Atsutane's beliefs regarding the character of his ruling deity and his judgements after death were heavily influenced by Christianity. In his Shūjōshōgo (出定笑語), Atsutane was harshly critical of Buddhism, while, though he was critical of Confucianism in his Tamadasuki (玉襷) for “babbling on about nothing more than Chinese philosophy without knowing the ancient ways,” he did agree with Confucianist ethics. Unlike Norinaga who was critical of primarily Confucianism in his theories on the ancient ways, Atsutane who actualized the religious nature of kokugaku saw not Confucianism but Buddhism as his primary adversary.

In this way, Hirata Atsutane moved away from Norinaga's positivist research and offered a Shinto theory integrated with many religious aspects. This resulted in criticism from other kokugaku scholars of the period that had been pupils of Norinaga such as Motoori Ōhira and Ban Nobutomo. At the same time, his theology drew many to study beneath him including Ōkuni Takamasa, Yano Harumichi, Maruyama Sakura, Gonda Naosuke, and Fukuba Bisei who would become influential in the restoration of imperial rule and the formation of religious policies in the early Meiji period.

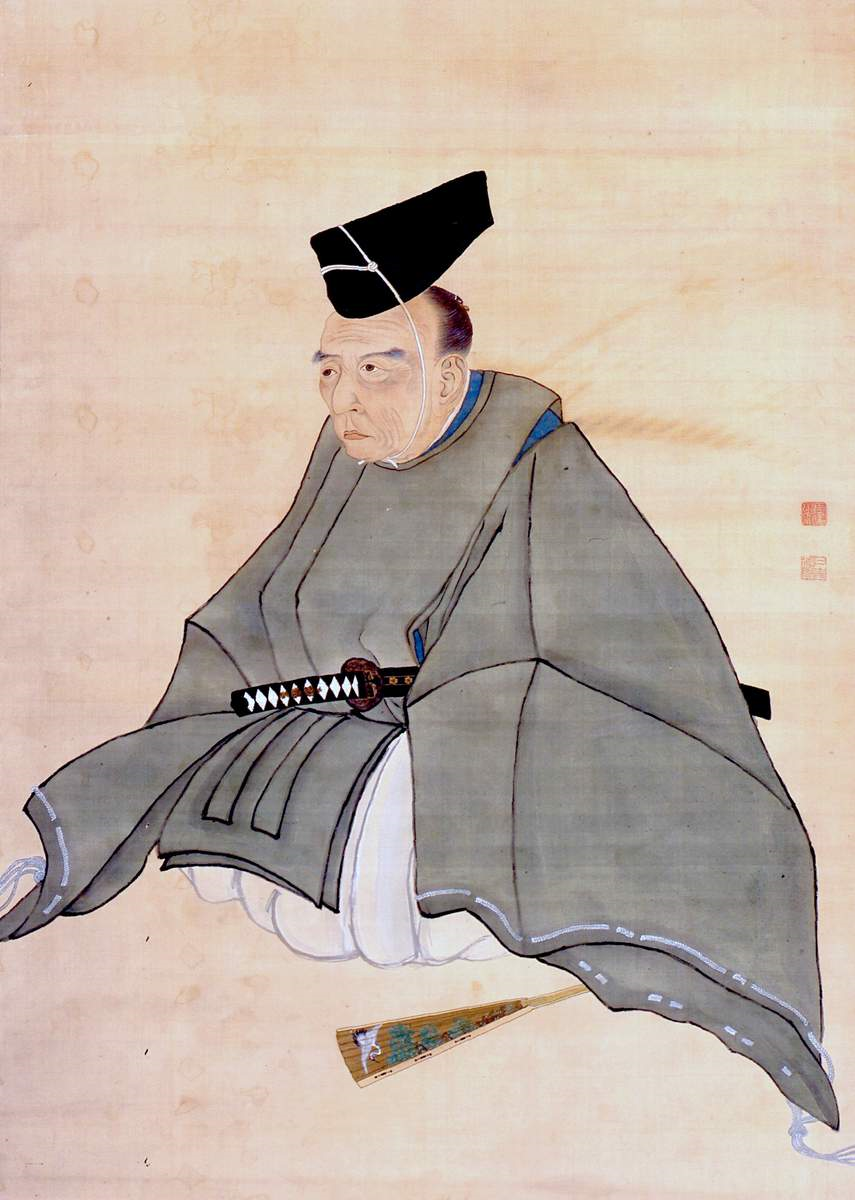
Aizawa Seishisai

Another force that emerged as the Shogunate was coming to an end was late Mitogaku. Mitogaku was a school of thought that emerged from the Mito Domain and an academic field that originated when Tokugawa Mitsukuni began the Dai Nihonshi. Early Mitogaku was a Confucianist school of thought characterized by its work on historical compilation and a view of history founded in the Cheng-Zhu-school-like concept of hierarchical distinction between rulers and vassals which developed up to the 18th century led primarily by Asaka Tanpaku, Sassa Munekiyo, Kuriyama Senpō, and Miyake Kanran. In the beginning of the 19th century, Japan was beset with troubles both domestic and foreign, such as in the form of pressure from foreign powers and the decline of the Tokugawa shogunate, and the academic school built up by early Mitogaku merged with kokugaku which then began speaking on societal ideals and actively providing suggestions for politics based in reality rather than ideals. This style of scholarship is called late Mitogaku which was led by Tachihara Suiken, student of Fujita Yūkoku who had been influenced by Ogyū Sorai’s teachings, and was then further developed by Tachihara's students, Fujita Tōko and Aizawa Seishisai. In Tōko's Kōdōkan Kijutsugi (弘道館記述義), he traces the unbroken imperial line first described in Japanese myth and rejected the system of Chinese dynasties which saw assassinations and transfers of power, while also criticizing the dynasties of Xia, Shang, and Zhou which had become viewed as divine eras in Confucianism. At this point, Confucianism had lost its guaranteed position within Mitogaku. However, Tōko also criticized kokugaku, expressing disagreement with Norinaga's position that Confucian ethics were in opposition to human nature, instead taking the view that Confucianism's ethics were valuable as, ever since its creation, Japan inherently had the Confucian values of loyalty, filial piety, benevolence, and justice. He was also harshly critical of Shinto-Buddhist syncretism, claiming that it would lead to the breakdown of the country but did praise Buddhism as an effective means for educating the people.

Later, Aizawa Seishisai made his arguments public through his Shinron (新論; “New Theory”). To counter Christianity—which he considered a means for invasion from the outside—and maintain Japan's independence, he outlined his views on the structure of the country, which included the view that Amaterasu placed rule of Japan with the long line of emperors and that all people of Japan from all classes were involved in some way in the governance of Japan as they maintained the place in society of the rulers and the ruled. He also integrated the Confucian values of loyalty and filial piety into his arguments, stating the people fulfil the value of loyalty by having served the emperor as his vassals through the generations, which is a manifestation of filial piety as people take on the work done by their ancestors. He also argued the Daijōsai was a ceremony meant to affirm the unity of emperor and people and applied Confucianism to the interpretation of Japanese myth by arguing that the Tenjōmukyū no Shinchoku (天壌無窮の神勅; lit. "divine decree as eternal as heaven and earth") seen in the Nihon Shoki in which Amaterasu commands Ninigi-no-Mikoto and his descendants to rule Japan is the beginning of loyalty in the ruler-subject relationship of the Five Relationships, and that the Hōkyō Hōsai no Shinchoku (宝鏡奉斎の神勅; lit. "divine decree to enshrine the mirror") which commanded the people to worship the Yata-no-Kagami as if it were Amaterasu herself was the beginning of the filial piety in the parent-child relationship. In this way, he linked Shinto and Confucianism with the belief that this was proof that human morality had been established in Japan long ago.

Late Mitogaku became a nursing ground for imperialists of the late Edo period such as Yoshida Shōin to develop their ideas.

== Modern era ==
=== Imperial Restoration and Separation of Shinto and Buddhism ===
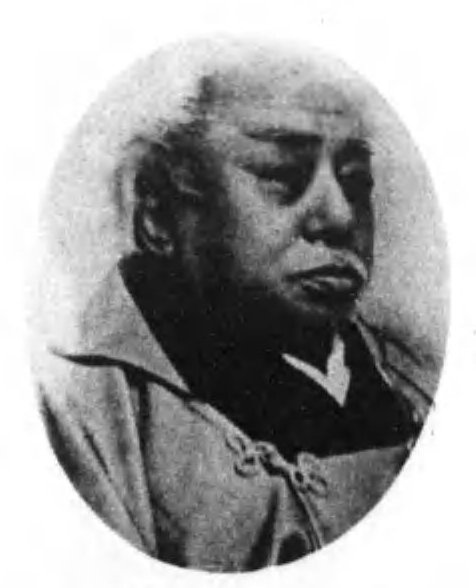
Fukuba Bisei. An influential power in the administration of Shinto in the early Meiji period.

The Decree for the Restoration of Imperial Rule (王政復古の大号令, Ōsei Fukko no Daigō-rei) was issued in 1867. The decree was drafted by kokugaku scholar Tamamatsu Mahiro, advisor to Iwakura Tomomi. The slogan Jinmu Sōgyō (神武創業; "Jinmu’s founding") was used to invoke the first emperor, supporting the legitimacy of the emperor today. The government focused first on Shinto as a means to support its goals of uniting government with religion and putting direct rule with the emperor and as such reestablished the Jingi-kan which was placed on the same level as the Daijō-kan. A position called senkyō-shi (宣教使) was established within the Jingi-kan which was responsible for the promulgation of Shinto in accordance with the Taikyo Proclamation. On 28 March 1868, the Shinbutsu Hanzen-rei (神仏判然令; "Order for Distinguishing Shinto and Buddhism") was issued, along with a directive ordering Buddhist monks who had become involved in ceremonies at Shinto shrines such as bettō and shasō (社僧) to be stripped of their Buddhist monk status and made into Shinto priests. Buddhist titles and rankings for kami such as daibosatsu (大菩薩) and gongen (権現) were abolished, and Buddhist paraphernalia within shrines such as statues and stupas were required to be relocated to a Buddhist temple outside the shrine's grounds. However, a loose interpretation by some of the Shinbutsu Hanzen-rei resulted in an extreme form of haibutsu kishaku, the rejection of Buddhism, which led to the destruction of Buddhist temples and statues by some lower-ranking government officials influenced by the anti-Buddhist ideals of Hirata Atsutane’s branch of kokugaku, Shinto priests who remained resentful towards Buddhist temples which had been in a position of power during the Edo period due to the temple certificate system (寺請制, terauke-sei), and a subsection of the common people. On 22 June 1868, the government released a notice stating, “the separation of Shinto and Buddhism does not mean the rejection of Buddhism,” in an attempt to curb this haibutsu kishaku. The Koki Kyūbutsu Hozon-kata (古器旧物保存方; "Plan for the Preservation of Ancient Artifacts") was enacted in 1871 and the destruction of Buddhist objects did subside. However, while this haibutsu kishaku lasted for only a short period, its impact was extensive and resulted in the loss of many Buddhist works of art.

Shugendō and Onmyōdō were also abolished. Onmyōdō was abolished in 1870 and onmyōshi (陰陽師; government officials of Onmyōdō) were released from government service to become private religious practitioners. Shugendō was abolished in 1872 and official practitioners left the government to become private practitioners or transferred into either the Shingon or Tendai Buddhist sects.

Furthermore, a new system for ranking shrines based on the system from the period of Ritsuryō was introduced, called the modern system of ranked Shinto shrines (近代社格制度), giving shrines government-issued rankings. Shrines were divided into two broad categories, those with these official rankings, called kansha (官社), and those without, called shosha (諸社). The kansha were then further divided into kanpeisha (官幣社), which received their heihaku from the national treasury for the Kinen-sai, Niiname-sai, and regular important festivals, and those that received their heihaku from their regional government. These were then further divided into major, mid, and minor shrines with Ise Shrine placed in its own category above. Shosha were divided into fusha (府社) and kensha (県社) where citizens of the prefectures worshipped, and gōsha (郷社) where residents of villages worshipped. There were also unranked shrines (無格社, mukakusha) which belonged to none of these categories. These and the shosha fell within the regional governors’ jurisdictions.

In 1875, the Shikibu-shō published Jinja Saishiki (神社祭式; "Shinto Rituals"), standardizing ceremonies at shrines throughout the country for the first time. This ordinance set the attendees and schedule of ceremonies at the various festivals held at the shrines, establishing set proceedings including a schedule for opening of the shrine, the offering of food, the offering of other goods, the reading of norito, the offering of tamagushi, the removal of offered goods, the removal of offered food, and closing of the shrine. In 1907, the Home Ministry issued the Jinja Saishiki Gyōji Sahō (神社祭式行事作法; "Shrine Ceremonies Event Etiquette") standardizing the etiquette for worshipping at shrines across the country. In 1914,Taisho Imperial Ordinance No. 9 Jingū Saishi-rei (神宮祭祀令; Ordinance on the Ceremonies of Ise Shrine) was issued which divided the festivals of Ise Shrine into major festivals (Kinen-sai, Niiname-sai, regularly scheduled festivals, relocation ceremonies, and unscheduled ritual offerings), mid festivals (Saitan-sai, Genshi-sai, Kigensetsu-sai, Tenchōsetsu-sai, Meijisetsu-sai, and other rituals with special history), and minor festivals (all other festivals). At the same time, Taisho Imperial Ordinance No. 10 Kankokuheisha-ika Jinja Saishi-rei (官国幣社以下神社祭祀令; Ordinance on the Ceremonies of Imperial and National Shrines and Below) was issued, doing the same to all nationally recognized shrines. Ceremonies in the imperial palace were standardized in the Kōshitsu Saishi-rei (皇室祭祀令; Imperial Household Rites Ordinance) and its supplements. In addition, the Tōkyoku-rei (登極令; Ascension Ordinance) and Riccho-rei (立儲令) formalized the ceremonies for the emperor's ascension, Sokui-no-rei, the Daijosai, and the Investiture as Crown Prince.

=== Formation and Development of State Shinto ===
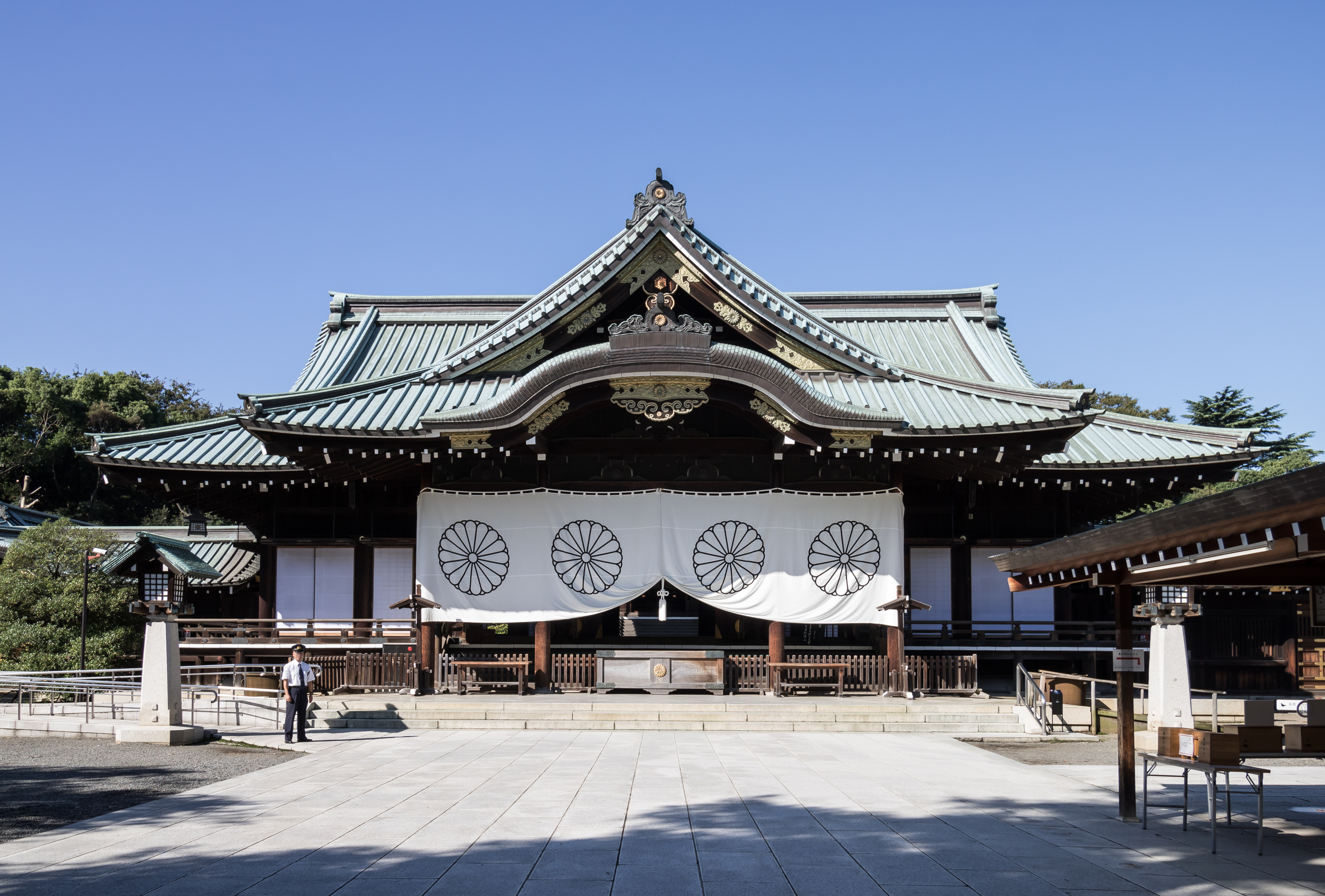
Yasukuni Shrine

In 1871, the issuing of Dajō-kan Proclamation (太政官布告, Dajō-kan Fukoku) 234 designated ceremonies at shrines as state rituals. This drastically changed the nature of shrines and Shinto that existed prior to this modern era, forming the system that would come to be known as State Shinto in which shrines were under state administration.

Kokugaku scholars of the Hirata school formed the central core of the government and aimed to unify government and religion (saisei itchi) and establish Shinto as the state religion, but progressive, influential members of the government such as Itō Hirobumi and Iwakura Tomomi instead aimed for the separation of church and state. In 1870, Tamamatsu Masao left the government after a clash with Iwakura. In 1871, Shintoists of the saisei itchi faction—Yano Harumichi, Gonda Naosuke, Tsunoda Tadayuki, Maruyama Sakura—were arrested for their involvement with the Two Lords Incident and exiled.

In 1875, the freedom of religion became guaranteed by law, and a Cabinet notice in 1882 designated Shinto as non-religious. In a reversal of the government's original aim of unifying state and religion came Secular Shrine Theory which applied an official character to Shinto which was now outside the realm of religion. The Meiji Constitution which was enacted in 1890 contained no mention of Shinto. Now that Shinto had come to be seen as state “rituals”, the existing hereditary system of the priesthood was abolished under the reason that no one family should monopolize a position, and priests were instead trained and appointed in the same way as other public servants. As shrines were now non-religious institutions, the priests of officially recognized shrines were forbidden from engaging in religious activities, preventing them from conducting Shinto funeral services or preaching Shinto doctrine. This resulted in a sudden loss of power for shake Shinto sects that had existed until that point, such as Yoshida Shinto and Ise Shinto. In 1871, land owned by shrines and temples other than the direct grounds were seized by the government with the issuance of the Shaji-ryō Jōchi-rei (社寺領上知令; Shrine and Temple Territory Seizure Order).

In 1871, the Department of Divinities which had been formed at the outset of the Meiji Restoration was downgraded into the Ministry of Divinities and made into a branch of the Daijō-kan. In 1872, administration of shrines was merged into a new department called the Ministry of Religion which controlled all religious activities, and the Ministry of Divinities was abolished. In 1877, it was downgraded further into the Bureau of Shrines which was nothing more than a bureau within the Home Ministry. Later in 1877, it was then merged with the administration of temples into the Bureau of Shrines and Temples. The Ministry of Religion had implemented a system of religious teachers called kyodo shoku which involved a combined effort by Shinto priests and Buddhist monks to instil patriotism and love for the emperor in the people. However, this system quickly collapsed due to conflict between the Shinto and Buddhist sides. Additionally, those who were working as kyodo shoku were only allowed to spread the so-called sanjō kyōsoku (三条教則; three teachings) which taught patriotism and respect for the emperor and were forbidden from preaching on the teachings or doctrines of Shinto or Buddhism. After the dissolution of the Ministry of Religion, the Bureau of Shinto Affairs was established by priests and others with connections to Shinto to carry on the activities of the Ministry of Religion. However, a debate developed around the Bureau over whether or not Ōkuninushi should be added to the Bureau's shrine. In 1882, the Kōten Kōkyūsho was established by taking over the dorms for the priests in study at the Bureau of Shinto Affairs. In 1890, the Kokugakuin (國學院), an educational institution, was established within the Kōten Kōkyūsho which later expanded into Kokugakuin University, a university for Shinto education. Similarly, the Kōgakkan (皇學館) which would later become another Shinto university, Kogakkan University, was established in 1882 on order of the master of ceremonies of Ise Shrine in the shrine's Hayashizaki Library.

When the administration of shrines was merged into the Bureau of Shrines and Temples in 1877, shrines of the prefectural rank and below were deemed religious in the same way as temples, and Shinto priests lost their status as civil servants. Then, in 1879, these shrines no longer received public funds. Public funds had no longer been used for paying priest salaries as of 1873. While priests of imperial and national shrines retained their status as civil servants, in 1887, the implementation of the system for the preservation of imperial and national shrines (官国幣社保存金制度, kankoku heisha hozonkin seido) which made it so that these priests would receive public funds for only the next ten years. These changes separating government and shrines was following a new policy of separation of church and state

The aforementioned Shaji-ryō Jōchi-rei (社寺領上知令; Shrine and Temple Territory Seizure Order) issued in 1871 damaged the financial state of shrines and temples, but shrines were hit particularly hard as the stance that shrines were non-religious had forbidden shrines from earning money through religious services such as funerals and now no longer received public funds either, while temples were expected to earn from their religious services. This placed shrines in a difficult financial situation throughout the Meiji era.

Also at the beginning of the Meiji era, several shrines were built for the worship of those who contributed significantly to the country such as Yasukuni Shrine which enshrines those who died in service to their country, Minatogawa Shrine which enshrines Kusunoki Masashige of the Southern Court, Kamakura-gū which enshrines Prince Morinaga, and the Kikuchi Shrines which enshrine members of the Kikuchi clan.

In contrast, the Meiji government combined a large number of shrines. This occurred in tangent with the rural improvement movement (地方改良運動, chihō kairyō undo) and reorganizing primarily the shrines closely linked to their regions such as village shrines and unranked shrines, reducing the number of shrines from 190,000 to 130,000. This process was criticized by several such as naturalist Minakata Kumagusu and folklorist Kunio Yanagita.

=== Movement to Revive the Department of Divinities ===
With Shinto shrines cut off from public funding, the Shinto priesthood established the National Association of Shinto Priests, demanding that if Shinto was the country's state religion, then the state had a responsibility to fund it, and led a movement to reestablish the Department of Divinities. This resulted in 1894 in the issuance of the Imperial Ordinance Regarding the Priesthood of Prefectural Shrines and Below (府県社以下神社ノ神職ニ関スル件), which established all clergy of prefectural shrines and below as salaried government officials appointed to their position by their local governor. In 1896, the Proposal to Reinstate the Department of Divinities was brought before the House of Representatives, but the proposal failed. However, in 1900, the Home Ministry’s Bureau of Shrines and Temples was split into the Bureau of Shrines and the Bureau of Religions, providing a clear, if superficial, division between the administration of Shinto and other religions. In 1906, the system for the preservation of imperial and national shrines was abolished, and state and imperial shrines were provided with permanent government funding, while local governments were given permission to provide funds to shrines of the prefectural level and below to be used for both edible and non-edible offerings.

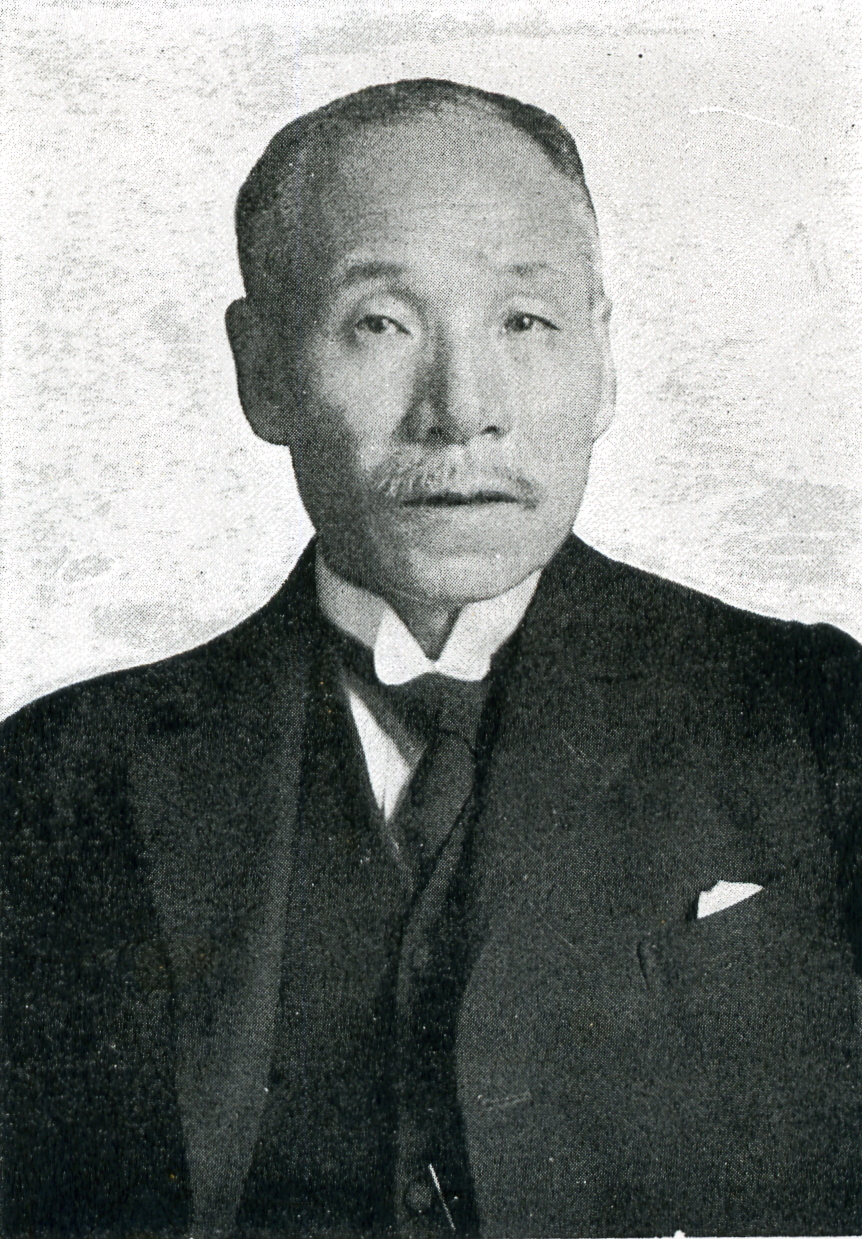
Mizuno Rentarō, the fourth director general of the Bureau of Shrines. He was an influential power in Shinto administration.

However, the amount of funds allocated to a state or imperial shrine was required to stay within the framework of the now defunct preservation system, limiting yearly disbursements to 210,000 yen adjusted for inflation which was close to a tenth of the operating costs of a shrine as large as a state or imperial one. And while local governments were allowed to provide an offering fee to a prefectural or lower shrine, they were not required to. For these reasons, these changes did not significantly improve the economic situation of shrines.

Additionally, the new Bureau of Shrines of the Home Ministry was passive in its administration of Shinto. The Bureau was firm in its stance that Shinto was not religious, endeavored to prohibit the transmission of religious ideology specific to Shinto, and strictly restricted the religious activities of the priesthood such as the performance of Shinto funerals and proselytization. The Bureau also worked to limit conflict between Shinto and other religions, stating that those foreign religions had all been assimilated into the national ethos and therefore must not be challenged. With this foundation, Shintoist Ashizu Uzuhiko argued that the Bureau of Shrines's primary duty was to completely undo any attempts to form a Shinto ideology, to wipe clean the Shinto ethos, and to eliminate any expressions of a unique Shinto way of thinking, all while striving to find peaceful resolutions for conflicts between Shinto and all other legally recognized religions such as Buddhism and Christianity so that State Shinto could exist without contradicting the division of church and state. The Bureau of Shrines was itself treated as a third-class bureau within the Home Ministry. The director general position of the Bureau was treated as nothing more than a place for people to receive an official posting before moving on to become prefectural governors or the heads of more influential bureaus, making it a sort of one- to two-year stop along a politician's career path before moving on to their next assignment, and many would have never read any norito or Shinto classical texts before receiving the post.

At the start of 1940, the Bureau of Shrines was reformed into the Institute of Divinities, but the Institute never implemented any significant policies and was then abolished after Japan's defeat during World War II.

=== Sect Shinto and Opposing Shinto Philosophy ===
This State Shinto system which had eliminated the expression of Shinto philosophy and wiped clean the Shinto ethos drew criticism from opposing Shinto priests and philosophers, some of whom laid out their own Shinto philosophy or created non-government Shinto organizations.

Of particularly great influence among these organizations were the thirteen sects of Sect Shinto. This usually refers to Kurozumikyō, Shinto Shusei, Izumo-taishakyo, Fuso-kyo, Jikkō kyō, Shinshu-kyo, Shintō Taiseikyō, Ontake-kyō, Shintō Taikyō, Misogikyo, Shinrikyo, Konkokyo, and Tenrikyo. Jingūkyō was originally included in this as well but was later restructured into the Jingū Hōsaikai (神宮奉斎会) and withdrew itself. These sects began emerging in the late Edo period having laid their foundation with folk beliefs and the Shinto philosophies of the modern era and then expanded under the religious administration of the Meiji era. In 1875, the Ministry of Religion abolished the kyōdo shōku position, and State Shinto separated itself from all religious aspects on the basis of the Secular Shrine Theory as discussed above. With priests now banned from proselytizing, these Shinto sects rapidly developed systems for proselytization as they became forces for spreading the Shinto religious philosophy. Over time, the Bureau of Shinto Affairs publicly acknowledged the independence of these organizations as members of Sect Shinto, resulting in thirteen officially acknowledged sects.

Tenrikyo in particular grew rapidly stronger from the mid-Meiji era onward, becoming the sect that was able to gain the greatest number of followers. Tenrikyo has its origin in a divine revelation Nakayama Miki was said to have received in 1838. She then took the words of the kami who spoke to her, Tenri-ō, and wrote them out as waka poetry to create the Ofudesaki, creating the sect's religious philosophy. The Ofudesaki preaches the Joyous Life ideal and places an emphasis on the relationship between husband and wife, but does not emphasise family or filial piety. It has a unique creation myth which differs significantly from what is written in the Kojiki and Nihon Shoki in which Tsukihi Oyagami (月日親神) (another name for Tenri-ō) finds a fish with a human face named Izanagi and a snake named Izanami in a sea of mud and teaches them the ways of reproduction as husband and wife, resulting in the birth of humanity. Tsukihi Oyagami then charges ten kami, of which Izanagi and Izanami are included, in protecting humanity.

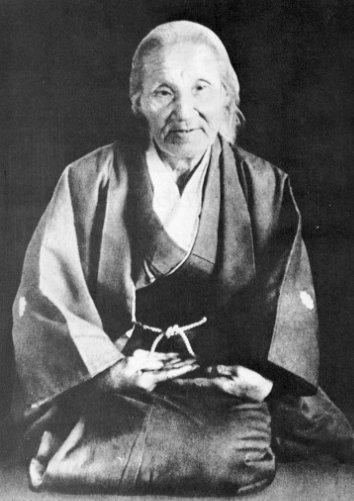
Nao Deguchi

Also of importance is the emergence of Oomoto which has its origins in 1892 when the kami Ushitora no Konjin is said to have spoken through Foundress Nao Deguchi who then went on to record those words in writing. In 1898, Deguchi met Kisaburō Ueda, who would become Onisaburo Deguchi, the Holy Teacher. In 1900, he married Nao Deguchi's daughter and was adopted into the Deguchi family as a mukoyōshi and began working with Nao Deguchi. The structure of the Oomoto sect was created from a combination of the divine proclamations of Nao Deguchi and the reijutsu (霊術) of Onisaburo Deguchi. After Asano Wasaburō of the Imperial Japanese Naval Engineering College became a follower, he was joined by several members of the intelligentsia and military resulting in a rapid increase of power to the point it was deemed a societal problem. Oomoto preaches the concept of human-God unity (神人一致, shinjin itchi) in which God is the being which has created all of existence, God's Spirit permeates all of creation, humans are the leaders of everything God has created, and they have been given tremendous knowledge and power by God in order to create God's ideal world. It is also believed that deep down humans understand God's heart, and that they should work to create the ideal world for humanity by receiving God's power and becoming one with God. Oomoto has had a significant influence on Shinto-style religious organizations that followed it, giving rise to a series of new religions referred to as “Oomoto-based” religions, including having influenced the formation of Seicho-No-Ie.

One general characteristic common among Sect Shinto sects is that, on top of a foundation of traditional kami-worship, they often also have a primary deity they worship and use traditional rites such as majinai (まじない) or divine divination to spread their teachings. And while Sect Shinto sects were officially recognized by the government, their ability to spread their individual teachings and gather followers resulted on several occasions in suppression by the government. Tenrikyo specifically was attacked with the Home Ministry's Secret Directive (秘密訓令, Himitsu Kunrei) forcing them to change their rites and other aspects of the sect. Oomoto as well saw suppression in the form of the First and Second Oomoto Incidents which resulted in the destruction of its headquarters, the dissolution of its entire organization, and the arrest of its leaders.

Additionally, Sect Shinto sects had a large number of Shinto philosophers who developed their own individual Shinto philosophies, unlike other Shinto-related religious organizations. Shintoist Kawatsura Bonji for example expressed his individual Shinto philosophy based on the belief that all religions are fundamentally one and all gods are fundamentally the same, including his critical view of the Home Ministry's administration of Shinto and his strong advocacy for the revival of a Shinto ethos primarily through the act of misogi. Influenced by Kawatsura was Imaizumi Sadasuke who was another who expressed his personal Shinto philosophies and conducted the first positivist research into Shinto since Motoori Norinaga while learning religious practices under Kawatsura. His beliefs were that it is a fundamental truth of the Universe that humans and kami are inherently one and that through the practice of harae one could purify their mind and body and bring the spirit of the aggregate kami within them and enter a state of unity with the kami. Imaizumi was critical of the government's administration of Shinto and the military's war policies and spoke against politicians to demand an end to war, resulting in a ban on his writings and records of his lectures during World War II.

=== The Shinto Directive and Postwar Shinto ===
After Japan surrendered at the end of World War II in 1945, the Supreme Commander for the Allied Powers (SCAP) enacted the Shinto Directive as one part of the occupation policy, dismantling the State Shinto system. Having determined Shinto to be a source of nationalistic ideology, in February 1946, SCAP abolished all laws regarding the administration of Shinto from the Meiji era onwards as well as all administrative bodies of shrines from the Institute of Divinities and below, a move that rejected the stance that shrines and their rites were state rituals. In accordance with the Religious Corporations Order (宗教法人令, Shūkyō Hōjin-rei) issued in December 1945, shrines were now treated as religious corporations in the same way as other religious organizations, and the Modern System of Ranked Shinto Shrines was abolished. The Religious Corporations Order was repealed at the end of the occupation, and the Religious Corporations Act was enacted in its place in 1951. The criteria for what constitutes a religious corporation are more strict in the Act than they had been in the Order, resulting in all shrines throughout Japan being classified as religious corporations.

In January 1946, three organizations were abolished—the National Association of Shinto Priests, the Institute of Japanese Classics Research, and the Jingū Service Foundation—and the Association of Shinto Shrines was established in their place to act as an umbrella organization overseeing the Shinto shrines throughout the country that would continue to exist as religious corporations.

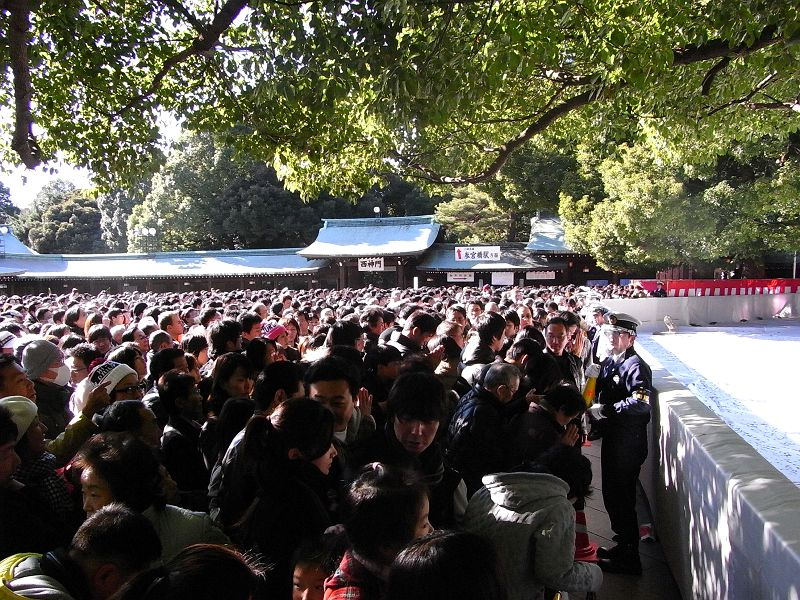
Hatsumōde at Meiji Shrine

Although shrines had lost their government standing, they attained an economic prosperity not seen before World War II as they were now able to conduct funerals and private prayer rituals which had been previously banned. As the Japanese economy grew in the Japanese economic miracle, shrines were able to repair and expand their facilities beyond what they had been able to do pre-war. However, increasing urbanization caused by the economic growth resulted in depopulation of rural areas, leading to other issues such as the loss of ujiko (the local worshippers of a shrine), and lack of successors for priest positions. Problems were also seen at shrines in the cities as the development of the cities and the increased mobility of the ujiko population worsened the shrine environment. There was also an increase in the number of people who were nominally ujiko but no longer took on the responsibilities of supporting the shrine that ujiko traditionally had.

== Contemporary Shinto ==
The Heisei era began in 1989, and Japan saw an increase in interest in power spots in the power spot boom beginning in the early 2000s, as well as an increase in interest in collecting shuin, red stamps given to visitors of shrines, in the 2010s. This resulted an increase in visitors to shrines, but also caused issues such as an increase in poor behavior and etiquette in shrine grounds and the reselling of shuin for profit. Additionally, the reduction in ujiko and advancing depopulation of rural areas together further exacerbated shrines’ financial situations. A 2015 survey of approximately 6,000 shrines across the country by the Association of Shinto Shrines found that only 2% of shrines had an annual income of 100 million yen or more, while approximately 60% of shrines responded that they had an annual income of less than 3 million yen. Particularly in rural areas, shrines had difficulties in securing revenue as the Japanese population aged and declined, resulting in a reduction in ujiko, making it infeasible for them to continue operating. An estimated 300 shrines closed between 2008 and 2018. Because of this, there have been several examples of shrines leasing portions of their grounds to be used for the construction of apartments and other such buildings as they had no other means to protect the continued survival of the shrine. There have also been examples of shrines overcoming these operational difficulties using a variety of strategies such as designing unique ema and shuin, hosting matchmaking parties, or opening cafes in order to make the shrine a place for people to relax. Additionally, there are many shrines across Japan that have become popular sites for fans of anime and manga to visit in a trend called seichi junrei in which fans visit the locations featured in these media, such as an increase in visitors seen at Washinomiya Shrine due to the 2007 anime Lucky Star.

In modern times, shrines also have a role in annual events for individuals and families as well as ceremonies for life events such as Hatsumōde, Miyamairi, Shichi-Go-San, and weddings. Shrines also play an important role in the preservation of cultural assets. As of 2009, there are thirty buildings at twenty-seven shrines designated as architectural National Treasures, several festivals and ceremonies such as Gion Matsuri are designated Important Cultural Properties, and shrines also preserve many traditional arts such as yabusame, gagaku, and kagura. Many shrines also play a role in preserving forests within urban areas, such as Meiji Shrine in metropolitan Tokyo which contains within its grounds 100 hectares of forest and approximately 3,000 species of living organisms. There has also been an increase in shrines making statements for the benefit of the environment, and the Association of Shinto Shrines representing the Shinto religion attended an international event in 2009 which saw several religions come together for peace. There, the Association argued from a Shinto perspective how important it is for nature and humanity to coexist.

During the COVID-19 pandemic the 2021 Hatsumode was called Saisaki-mode and had special observances for it.

== Bibliography ==
- Muraoka, Tsunetsugu [in Japanese] (1936). Naobi no Mitama & Tamaboko Hyakushu 直毘霊・玉鉾百首 [The Upright Spirit & A Hundred Poems on the Jeweled Sword] (in Japanese). Iwanami Shoten. ISBN 978-4-00-302194-1.
- Taira, Shigemichi [in Japanese]; Abe, Akie [in Japanese] (1972). Kinsei Shintō-ron, Zenki Kokugaku 近世神道論 前期国学 [Modern Shinto, Early Kokugaku]. 日本思想大系 39 (in Japanese). Iwanami Shoten. ISBN 978-4-00-070039-9.
- Tahara, Tsuguo [in Japanese] (1973). Hirata Atsutane, Ban Nobutomo, Ōkuni Takamasa 平田篤胤・伴信友・大国隆正 [Hirata Atsutane, Ban Nobutomo, Okuni Takamasa]. 日本思想大系 50 (in Japanese). Iwanami Shoten. ISBN 978-4-00-070050-4.
- Osumi, Kazuo [in Japanese] (1977). Chūse Shintō-ron 中世神道論 [Medieval Shinto Theory]. 日本思想大系 19 (in Japanese). Iwanami Shoten. ISBN 978-4-00-070019-1.
- Ashizu, Uzuhiko [in Japanese] (1987). Kokka Shintō to wa nan datta no ka? 国家神道とは何だったのか [What was State Shinto?] (in Japanese). Jinja Shinpōsha. ISBN 978-4-915265-60-0.
- Yoshie, Akio [in Japanese] (1996). Shinbutsu-shūgō 神仏習合 [Shinto-Buddhist Syncretism]. Iwanami Shinsho (in Japanese). Iwanami Shoten. ISBN 978-4-00-430453-1.
- Kokugakuin University Institute of Japanese Culture, ed. (1999). (Shukusatsu-ban) Shintō Jiten 〔縮刷版〕神道事典 [Shinto Encyclopedia (Compact Edition)] (in Japanese). Kōbundō. ISBN 978-4-335-16033-2.
- Sueki, Fumihiko (2003). Chūse no Kami to Butsu 中世の神と仏 [Kami and Buddha in the Middle Ages] (in Japanese). Yamakawa Shuppansha. ISBN 978-4-634-54320-1.
- Okada, Shouji [in Japanese], ed. (2010). Nihon Shintō-shi 日本神道史 [History of Japanese Shinto] (in Japanese). Yoshikawa Kōbunkan. ISBN 978-4-642-08038-5.
- Sakamoto, Koremaru [in Japanese]; Ishii, Kenji [in Japanese] (2011). Puresuteppu Shintō-gaku プレステップ神道学 [Pre-Step Shinto Theory] (in Japanese). Kōbundō. ISBN 978-4-335-00079-9.
- Ito, Satoshi [in Japanese] (2012). Shintō to wa Nani ka? 神道とは何か [What is Shinto?]. 中公新書 2158 (in Japanese). Chuokoron-Shinsha. ISBN 978-4-12-102158-8.
- Jinja no Iroha, tsuzuki 神社のいろは 続 [The ABCs of Shrines, cont.] (in Japanese). Fusosha Publishing. 2013. ISBN 978-4-594-06764-9.
- Shimizu, Masayuki [in Japanese] (2014). Nihon Shisō Zenshi 日本思想全史 [A Complete History of Japanese Thought]. ちくま新書 (in Japanese). Chikuma Shobō. ISBN 978-4-480-06804-0.
- Sueki, Fumihiko [in Japanese]; Yorizumi, Mitsuko [in Japanese], eds. (2018). Nihon Bukkyō o Toraenaosu 日本仏教を捉え直す [Rethinking Japanese Buddhism]. 放送大学教材 (in Japanese). The Open University of Japan. ISBN 978-4-595-31853-5.
- Mori, Kazuya [in Japanese] (2018). Shintō, Bukkyō, Jukyō 神道・仏教・儒教 [Shinto, Buddhism and Confucianism]. ちくま新書 (in Japanese). Chikuma Shobō. ISBN 978-4-480-07139-2.
- Numabe, Harutomo [in Japanese]; Motegi, Sadazumi [in Japanese], eds. (2018). Shintō Saishi no Dentō to Saishiki 神道祭祀の伝統と祭式 [The Traditions and Ceremonies of Shinto Rituals] (in Japanese). Ebisukosyo Publications. ISBN 978-4-86403-278-0.
