= Shrine Consolidation Policy =

Empire of Japan policy to merge shrines

The Shrine Consolidation Policy (Jinja seirei, also Jinja gōshi, Jinja gappei) was an effort by the Government of Meiji Japan to abolish numerous smaller Shinto shrines and consolidate their functions with larger regional shrines. In 1900, the Shrine Bureau (Jinja kyoku) was created as a branch of the Home Ministry, and it was this organ that was responsible for the implementation of the policy.

The aim of the policy was to reduce the political influence of Shinto, bringing the remaining shrines under government jurisdiction and making them easier to control. Within the first twenty years of the policy, 77,899 Shinto shrines were closed, despite considerable local opposition. The policy remained in effect until the end of World War II, although its greatest impact occurred in the first six years after its implementation in 1906; by 1912, the rate at which shrines were closed had fallen considerably.

== Overview ==
The process of shrine consolidation involved either enshrining the deities of multiple shrines in one shrine, or relocating them to the setsumatsusha of one shrine and eliminating the other shrines.

The Japanese government carried out shrine merger policies between the end of the Meiji and the start of the Taisho eras, with the goal of enhancing the presence of shrines as a whole. The Shrine Bureau in the Home Ministry planned the reorganization and abolition of smaller, unviable shrines, particularly village shrines and unranked shrines. The government's stated purpose was to organize existing shrines and limit the provision of shrine offerings to a select few. However it was accused of corruption and attempting to seize land for financial gain An imperial edict in 1906 entitled "With Regard to the Provision of Offerings to Shrines of Prefectural Rank and Below" was the beginning of this. The sought to financially support shrines but only those that were thriving, so the government started merging shrines so only supported shrines would be present. The surrender of land belonging to merged shrines, temples, and other sacred sites was required under the 1906 edict, without compensation. Local authorities in Wakayama and Mie Prefectures in particular forced through a rigorous program of mergers, resulting in a significant reduction in the number of shrines by 1914.

Some intellectuals and politicians resisted the merger policy, leading to its eventual eschewal by the Shrine Bureau.

== Shrine merger at the end of the Meiji period ==
=== Purpose of Shrine merger ===
The purpose of Shrine merger was to reduce the number of shrines and concentrate expenses on the remaining shrines so that they would be equipped with facilities and property above a certain standard, to maintain the dignity of the shrines, and to establish the continuous management of the shrines. In addition, the Meiji government's national principle that sect Shinto is recognized as a religion, but that shrines are not religions but "national religious ceremonies." The policy was also to reduce the number of shrines until it was financially feasible for local governments to provide public funds to prefectural shrines and smaller shrines in accordance with the Ministry of the Interior.

This policy was led by the Ministry of Home Affairs Shrine Bureau, but apparently the Ministry's Regional Bureaus were also involved. The local bureaus were reluctant to allow local governments to contribute public funds to shrines below the prefectural level, which was one of the purposes of Shrine merger, because it would require local governments to bear an additional fiscal burden. It was incorporated into the policy.

The shrine-centered theory refers to the idea that local autonomy should be centered on shrines, and this led to the application of the "one town, one village, one shrine" standard to the policy of Shrine merging. By aligning the shrine's Ujiko area with administrative divisions, the government sought to make the sole shrine of a town village the center of local activities.

== Background of the ritual policy ==
The shrine ritual policy was promoted by the edict issued by the Minister of the Interior, Takashi Hara, in the 1st Saionji Cabinet in 1906 (Meiji 39), and initially it was given a considerable range according to the actual situation of the region. However, 70,000 shrines, which were about 200,000 by 1914 (Taisho 3), were demolished nationwide because Tosuke Hirata, the Minister of Interior of the Second Katsura Cabinet, ordered that the instruction be strongly promoted. In particular, Mie Prefecture had a particularly strong policy of enshrining, and about 90% of all shrines in the prefecture were abolished. Wakayama and Ehime Prefectures were followed by a ritual policy. However, since it was left to the governor's discretion to proceed with this policy, the degree of implementation will vary from region to region, and in Kyoto Prefecture it is about 10%.

The shrine consolidation policy, which was based on bureaucratic rationalism, was not always implemented in accordance with the wishes of the shrine parishioners and worshippers. Settlements and administrative divisions did not always match, which resulted in some Ujigami being moved to places far from their worshippers due to the shrine mergers. As a result, some Ujigami were unable to be worshipped. Although some shrine parishioners refused to worship, in some places they were forced to worship.

=== Opposition movement ===
On the part of the shrine parishioners and worshippers, they sometimes held meetings in opposition, but mainly they could not make any major movements, and could only show their dissatisfaction in the form of talking about how the deities of the shrines that had been abolished by the merged shrine had caused hauntings, etc.

Minakata Kumagusu, a naturalist and folklore scholar known for his research on slime molds, strongly opposed this policy in his native Wakayama Prefecture. In a letter to Tokyo Imperial University Professor Shirai Mitsutarō, he listed eight detriments caused by shrine consolidation:

1. Regarding the principles of kami reverence, the Shrine Bureau is tricked by the provincial governments.
2. Shrine mergers disrupt the harmony of the people.
3. Shrine mergers cause the decay of the provinces.
4. Shrine mergers rob the peace of the people, weaken human sensibilities, and destroy local customs.
5. Shrine mergers damage the patriotic feelings of the people.
6. Shrine mergers harm the safety and prosperity of the provinces.
7. Shrine mergers destroy historical sites and oral tradition.
8. Shrine mergers destroy the natural scenery and natural monuments of the region.

Translated from Minakata Kumagusu's February 1912 letter to Shirai Mitsutarō.

Minakata's letter would eventually reach Wakayama Representative Nakamura Keijirō, who would deliver an speech based on its contents to the National Diet on 22 March 1912.

These opposition movements gradually came to a halt, and through the responses of the Imperial Diet, the sudden increase in Shrine merging was temporarily halted after 1910. However, it was already too late, and this policy of Shrine merging had left a large impact, resulting in the disappearance of many rituals and customs, and damaging religious beliefs.

== Reconstruction of destroyed shrines ==
After the war, the prewar shrine non-religious system was dismantled and everything became a religious corporation. Many shrines were once merged and then revived. Even after the shrine was nominally enshrined, there were some places where facilities such as the shrine were left, and it was easy to rehabilitate in those places. Overall, it was easy to rehabilitate where the pre-government reverence base was maintained, but if the community that became the worship base disappeared or changed due to the consolidation of administrative divisions or changes in circumstances.

== See also ==
- Shinto
  - State Shinto
  - Glossary of Shinto
- Haibutsu kishaku
- Shinbutsu bunri
- Shinbutsu-shūgō
