= Nonprofit corporation =

Legal entity that does not aim to earn profit

A nonprofit corporation is any legal entity which has been incorporated under the law of its jurisdiction for purposes other than making profits for its owners or shareholders. If the corporation meets the legal requirements, which vary by jurisdiction, it may seek official recognition as a non-profit corporation. Non-profit corporations are not automatically tax exempt, and many non-profit organizations, such as homeowners' associations, are not eligible to become tax-exempt. However, public charities, churches, and similar non-profit organizations may be taxed differently from for-profit corporations, and treated differently in other ways.

== Public-benefit nonprofit corporations ==
A public-benefit nonprofit corporation is a type of nonprofit corporation chartered by a state government, and organized primarily or exclusively for social, educational, recreational or charitable purposes by like-minded citizens. Public-benefit nonprofit corporations are distinct in the law from mutual-benefit nonprofit corporations in that they are organized for the general public benefit, rather than for the interest of its members. They are also distinct in the law from religious corporations.

== Religious corporation ==
A religious corporation is a nonprofit corporation organized to promote religious purposes.

Often these types of corporations are recognized under the law on a subnational level, for instance by a state or province government. The government agency responsible for regulating such corporations is usually the official holder of records, for instance a state Secretary of State. Religious corporations are formed like all other nonprofit corporations by filing articles of incorporation with the state. Religious corporation articles need to have the standard tax exempt language the IRS requires.

Religious corporations are subject to less rigorous state and federal filing and reporting requirements than many other tax-exempt organizations, such as mutual benefit nonprofit corporations, or public benefit nonprofit corporations. Depending on the state in which they are located, they may also be exempt from some of the inspections or regulations governing non-religious groups performing the same services.

=== Corporation sole ===
Religious corporations are permitted to designate a person to act in the capacity of corporation sole.

== Mutual-benefit nonprofit corporations ==
A mutual-benefit nonprofit corporation or membership corporation, in the United States, is a type of nonprofit corporation chartered by a state government that exists to serve its members in ways other than obtaining and distributing profits to them. Therefore, it cannot obtain IRS 501(c)(3) non-profit status as a charitable organization.

A mutual-benefit corporation can be non-profit or not-for-profit, but it still must pay regular corporate tax rates. A mutual benefit corporation will pay the same taxes as a regular for-profit corporation, with C corporation tax rates. Mutual benefit corporations must still file tax returns and pay income tax because they are not formed for a purpose from which anyone in the world could benefit. Mutual benefit corporations are formed for nonprofit purposes like managing a condo association, a downtown business district, or a homeowners' association.

A utility cooperative is an example of an MBNC.

== See also ==
- Civic Voice
- Civic Trust (England)
