= Shrine Shinto =

Mainstream non-doctrinal Shinto

Shrine Shinto is a form of the Shinto religion. It has two main varieties: State Shinto, a pre-World War II variant, and another centered on Shinto shrines after World War II, in which ritual rites are the center of belief, conducted by an organization of clergy.

Today, the term Shinto usually refers to Shrine Shinto. Shrines throughout Japan serve as places of worship. Until 1945 all Shinto shrines were under the jurisdiction of the Institute of Divinities, an external department of the Home Ministry. The Shinto Directive issued by the GHQ in December 1945 abolished the Institute of Divinities, which was reorganized as one religious corporation, the Association of Shinto Shrines.

Shinto shrines and Shinto rituals are performed in accordance with sacred texts such as Kojiki and Nihon Shoki. The Kannushi are in charge of the rituals, holding positions such as priests, priests-in-charge, and administer the rituals. The miko of Shinto shrines are not included in the priesthood. A Kagura dancer may participate in Shinto rituals, but may not preside over or perform Shinto rituals.

== Education ==
Two universities and seven technical/vocational schools exclusively offer training programs for the priesthood. The length of study ranges from one to four years. These educational institutions accept students from standalone shrines and from shrines belonging to Sect Shinto.

These two universities are Kokugakuin University, and Kogakkan University.

== Administration ==
After World War II, the Jinja Honcho supervised the largest number of shrines. But since technically the religious corporation status is a condition for membership, small shrines that do not have a juridical character are not eligible and are not allowed to belong to the Honcho. Fewer than half of juridical shrines, such as in Higashiosaka City are not members of the Association.

Several Shinto shrines throughout Japan, such as Kamakura-gū, Yasukuni Shrine, Fushimi Inari-taisha, Keta Shrine, Nikko Toshogu, Tomioka Hachiman Shrine, and Hinokuma Jingu are not members of the Association of Shinto Shrines, but still considered as Shrine Shinto rather than Sect Shinto.

80,000 Shinto shrines were under the jurisdiction of Institute of Divinities, consisting of 7,800 managed by the Association of Shinto Shrines and others that became standalone shrines. Outside the Association, 91 shrines belong to Seishin Meiseikai, 78 to Jinja Honkyo, 72 to Jinja Sandonkyo, 60 to Hokkaido Shrine Association, 23 to Japan Jingu Honcho, and 15 to Japan Shrine Kyodan.

== History ==
The term Shrine Shinto was created to distinguish it from denominational Shinto after the Meiji era. In 1868, the Restoration Government established the Department of Divinities to centralize administration. However, the State Shinto policy was unsuccessful, so the Ministry of Divinities was established and a campaign to proclaim the Great Doctrine began.

On January 24, 1882, the Ministry of the Interior issued Ministerial Instruction No. B7, "Jikko-kamikami ha kyōdōshi ni kyōdōshi ni kyōsoku wo kyōsoku wo kyōdōshi no kanryūmono mono to sasaru mono" ("Shinto Priests are not a religion") and declared that Secular Shrine Theory. As a result "religions" such as denominational Shinto and Buddhism and Shrine Shinto separated, and declared that Shinto was a national, not religious, ritual.

Although the Religion Bill of 1899 did not include Shinto or Christianity, denominational Shinto began to be referred to as national Shinto toward the end of the Meiji period.

Shinto shrines were included in the Shinto religion, but did not have the same teachings and precepts as Buddhism. They were protected by the government until the end of World War II.

In 1917, the Japanese Christian Church rejected Secular Shrine Theory on the grounds that students were forced to worship at shrines. A further complaint was filed that the coercion violated the freedom of religion specified in the Meiji Constitution.

State Shinto and Shrine Shinto were named in 1924. Before World War II, Shrine Shinto referred to the rituals, ideology, and organization of shrines, which in modern times have been subject to government control.

Shinto was once to be administered by the Bureau of Shinto Affairs, but was eventually separated from Shrine Shinto as Sect Shinto, and the Bureau itself made a sect called Shinto Taikyo. The Shinto shrines were then administered by the Home Ministry. Under the influence of the National Spiritual Mobilization Movement, they were separated from Shinto shrines in 1940, becoming independent.

== See also ==
- Seicho-no-Ie
- List of Shinto shrines
- Secular Shrine Theory
- Shinto sects and schools
- Sect Shinto

== Bibliography ==
- 世界大百科事典. Vol. 16巻. 平凡社. 1978 [1972-04-25].
