= Bureau of Shrines and Temples =

Japanese government organization

- Predecessor: Ministry of Religion
- Successor: Bureau of Shrines, Bureau of Religion
- Formation: 1877
- Dissolved: April 1900

The Bureau of Shrines and Temples. (社寺局, Shaji kyoku) was a bureau of the Meiji government.

It was established in 1877 to administer matters related to religion, including shrines and temples, and Sect Shinto such as Tenrikyo and Kurozumikyō. It was a bureau of the Home Ministry.

In April 1900 (33rd year of Meiji), the bureau was divided into two bureaus, the Bureau of Shrines and the Bureau of Religion. Temples, Christianity and new religions were transferred to the Bureau of Religion. This was an official acknowledgement of Secular Shrine Theory or the idea that Shrine Shinto was not a religion and as a result under state control, hence the separate Bureau of Shrines under the Home Ministry.

== See also ==
- Department of Divinities
- Ministry of Religion
- State Shinto
- Association of Shinto Shrines
