= Secular Shrine Theory =

Japanese idea on the separation of Church and State

Secular Shrine Theory (Japanese: 神社非宗教論, Hepburn: Jinja hishūkyōron) was a legal and political theory arising in Japan during the 19th and early 20th centuries that treated Shrine Shinto as nonreligious. It argued that shrines and shrine rites belonged to the public sphere as expressions of national custom, civic morality, and imperial tradition rather than private religious belief. This theory became an important basis for the state's administration and played a central role in debates over the relationship between Shinto, religion, and the modern Japanese state.

== Background ==
In the early Meiji era, Japanese officials were forced to decide how Shinto institutions would fit the new modern categories of state, society, and religion. As the government responded to the growth of organized Shinto groups, "Sect Shinto" was formed as an administrative category for movements treated more clearly as religions. However, shrines increasingly followed a different institutional path. In 1871, the state officially declared shrines to be public institutions rather than private ones. The 1882 separation of Shinto priests from national evangelists, and the later 1900 division between the Bureau of Shrines and the Bureau of Religions, helped establish the idea that shrines belonged to a national civic field distinct from Buddhism, Christianity, and Sect Shinto. By the late 19th century, the distinction became increasingly important as Japanese officials tried to define both "religion" and the "secular" within a modern constitutional order. In this context, Secular Shrine Theory developed as a way of explaining and defending the state's treatment of shrine rites as public practice rather than religion.

== Linguistic debate ==
The linguistic debate over shūkyō (宗教) was important because modern Japanese officials were not simply translating a foreign term. Instead, they were also deciding which institutions would be governed as religions and which would be treated as part of public life.

Translating the word "religion" into Japanese has been controversial from the beginning, with some scholars arguing it was a Christian concept that did not apply to Shinto.

Kozaki Hiromichi first translated the English word "religion" as shūkyō (宗教). (Note: First character means "school; sect; purpose"; second character means "teaching") Before that, Fukuzawa Yukichi translated it as shūmon (宗門) (Note: First character means "school; sect; purpose", same as in shukyō; second character literally means "gate", also used to mean "school of thought; phylum (in biology)") and shūshi (宗旨), (Note: First character means "school; sect; purpose", same as in shukyō; second character means "principle; decree") and Masanao Nakamura translated it as hōkyō (法教). (Note: First character means "law"; second character means "teaching", same as in shukyō)

According to Genchi Kato:

There is no doubt that Christianity in Japan had the idea that Christianity is the true religion in the background when they proposed the Japanese translation of the religion. In Japan, however, Buddhism, a major world religion, existed before Christianity and had a considerable number of followers. There were many high priests and great scholars among the monks. No one, not even Christians, could ignore this fact, so when the translation of the word "religion" was disseminated, there must have been some thought that Christianity was the greatest of all religions, and that Buddhism could be added to it and included in the translation of the word "religion". In other words, the translation of the word "religion" was devised only for world religions and individual religions such as Buddhism and Christianity, and not for tribal religions, national religions, or group religions in religious studies.

In other words, Shinto was not included in the translation of "religion".

In the Taishō era (1912–1926), the origin of the word "religion" was traced back to Latin, which came from Christian studies. The classical etymology of the word, traced to Cicero himself, derives it from relegere: prefix re- ("again") + lego ("read"), where lego is in the sense of "go over", "choose", or "consider carefully". Modern scholars such as Tom Harpur and Joseph Campbell have argued that religio is derived from religare, as re- ("again") + ligare ("bind; connect"), which was made prominent by Augustine of Hippo, following the interpretation of Lactantius in Divinae institutiones, IV, 28.

They have known me for a long time and can testify, if they are willing, that I conformed to the strictest sect of our religion, living as a Pharisee.

The word shūkyō (宗教) comes from Buddhism, according to Buddhist scholar Hajime Nakamura. In Buddhism, it referred to "the teaching of the sect", meaning the ultimate principle or truth; religion existed as a subordinate concept of Buddhism.

Christian theologians have traditionally held that the meaning and wording of the word "religion" has continued in its original meaning from Latin, which is the way it is used today. The Christian position since its introduction in Japan has been that Shinto is a religion. In Japan, there was a deep-rooted sense of caution against foreign religions. Christian missionary activity, which began at the start of the Meiji era, was also divided into different denominations, which caused problems.

It is believed that followers of Shinto adopted the Secular Shrine Theory in part because they argued that Shinto is different from Buddhism and Christianity; that is, it is unique to Japan. On the contrary, from Buddhist and Christian perspectives, the argument was that Shinto is a religion because it has an object of veneration.

During that time, the religious and non-religious nature of Shinto shrines was debated not as a legal issue but purely as a matter of religious studies. However, it never became a social or political issue that could move public opinion, because it was a debate within academia, and never developed into a political movement.

Peter L. Berger in The Sacred Canopy offers a modern objection to this idea:

Since religion is a comprehensive phenomenon with diverse, complex, and multifaceted aspects, if we try to define religion by focusing on one aspect of its characteristics, other important aspects will be neglected. Therefore, if we take up one aspect of religion as a characteristic, other important aspects will be neglected. In this way, the way religion is perceived from a scientific standpoint is also divided into various views. Therefore, it should be said that there is still no single definition of religion that has been finally agreed upon by all researchers.

== Meiji Constitution ==
The Meiji Constitution gave the debate over Secular Shrine Theory practical legal significance by linking religious freedom to the state's authority to define which practices counted as "religion".

The Meiji Constitution stated that subjects will have freedom of religion as long as it does not interfere with their duties as subjects, which has been interpreted as making the Imperial Cult separate.

On January 24, 1882, a Home Ministry notice stated that shrines were not religious (Secular Shrine Theory). However, Shinto funeral rites under Prefectural shrines were allowed, and the priests of the great shrines were not considered clergy.

It was argued that

Shinto shrines are an inherent belief of the Japanese people that has existed inseparably from the national identity since the beginning of Japan, and are the basis of the Constitution. It is only natural that there is nothing in the articles of the Constitution that provides for shrines, and the faith of the Japanese people in shrines should not be subject to the religious freedom provisions of the Constitution. The content of the Shinto rituals is a combination of Confucian moral and Buddhist religious thought and beliefs that are unique to the nation. This is not a complete shrine system.

The shrine system should be established by embracing the full range of the current situation of shrines, and in short, it should have a form unique to the empire and unrivaled in all countries, apart from the boundaries of translation law.

In the "On the Relationship between Religious Bills and Shrines", which appears to have been prepared by the Home Ministry Bureau of Shrines around 1930, it was stated that:

Shrines exist institutionally for the purpose of public rituals of the state. At the same time, individual citizens can obtain objects of worship through shrines, but this is not the original purpose of shrines in the system, but only a reflexive benefit that accompanies the system of shrines. Since the state, as a matter of principle, does not interfere with the faith of individual citizens (Article 28 of the Imperial Japanese Constitution), it is not necessary to explain again that it is not the purpose of the state to run shrines institutionally that shrines become the object of faith for individual citizens. If we assume that the existence of Shinto spirits is recognized, and therefore shrines must be treated as a religion, then we can say that shrines are the religion of our country.

However, since the state's own rituals of Shinto are unparalleled in all ages, it must be strictly distinguished from the so-called national religions of European countries. In short, regardless of the academic definition of religion, shrines are institutionally the rituals of our nation.

== Internal Shinto controversy ==
Originally, the Meiji government was aiming for a politics of "Unity of ritual and government" due to the "Proclamation of the Great Doctrine", but due to the conflict between the "Buddhist side" and the "Shinto side" over the teaching profession, "the joint mission of God and Buddha was prohibited". It begins with the transfer of each religious administration to the Ministry of Interior. The following is a description of the situation that led to the "separation of religious and political affairs" from the "Shinto controversy". The separation of religious and political affairs is said to have been proposed by the Shinto side, and was led by Maruyama Sakura and others.

Following the dissolution of the Great Teaching Institute, the Bureau of Shinto Affairs was established. In 1881, the Shinto priests of the Ise sect, Yoritsune Tanaka and others, and the priest of the Izumo sect, Senge Takatomi, argued over the ritual deity. This led to an imperial request to Emperor Meiji. The Jōdo Shinshū side did not stand idly by and watch this chaotic situation, and following Shimaji Mokurai, Atsumi Kaien, Akamatsu Renjo and other theoreticians went out one after another to advise the government to cooperate. It was the successor to Shimaji Mokurai's theory that Shinto is not a religion, and the political powers that be were forced to confirm it, and to forbid all religious speech, teaching, and religious acts (such as funeral rites) by priests involved in state ceremonies. This would have completely blocked the way for "Shinto as a religious belief" to become the national religion.

It is not clear who the primary proponents on the Shinto side were. Originally, the word "Shūkyō (宗教)" was a translation of the English word "religion", and there is no clear definition of the concept. The Shinto side referred to Shinto as the "national religion" or "main religion", but there was no such theory that Shinto was a part of a religion. The non-religious theory of Maruyama Sakura and others is thought to have been based on their concern about the situation in which Shinto was becoming divided due to ritual god disputes, etc., which resembled "religious theological disputes" in the new terminology of the time, and the fact that Shinto could not maintain its national status without stopping such divisions.

According to Yoshio Keino of Keio University, the government did not originally present the theory of non-religious shrines, but it was actively promoted by the Buddhist side. This is because the situation at the time was that the definition of religion was "proselytizing and conducting funerals.

Among them, Yamada Akiyoshi, the Minister of the Interior, adopted the theory of non-religious shrines presented by the Shinto side, including Maruyama Sakura.

Later, Senge Takatomi left the Bureau of Shinto Affairs in order to proselytize and founded the Izumo Taisha-kyo.

=== Department of Divinities Reconstruction Movement ===
After the Satsuma Rebellion, the Satsuma Domain and other Shizoku began to focus on the management of Shinto shrines dedicated to their Ujigami. And with that, the Priests emerged as the Freedom and People's Rights Movement.

In June 1887, Shinto priests in Kyushu organized the Saikai Rengo-kai, which appealed to Shintoists throughout the country, arousing strong sympathy and emerging as a nationwide organized movement of Shinto priests. On November 17, 1887, representatives from each prefecture met at the Imperial Classic Research Institute, and each committee member formed an association of priests, and launched a nationwide movement to revive the Shinto priests.

Also, in March 1890, rumors circulated in Shinto circles that Shinto was also included as a religion in order to restore it to its original state.

Uzuhiko Ashizu said:

In order to restore Shinto to its original state, at least the state structure must be changed, the Shinto priest must be restored, and the spirit and system of "Shinto is the ritual of the state" must be restored from this base.

And behind the nationwide movement in the 1890s to revive the Shinto priesthood was a sense of "crisis" among Shinto priests and those involved in the Shinto religion against a government that was promoting a skeletonization of the "state's suzerainty" of Shinto shrines. When rumors of the religious ordinances began to circulate, a full-scale movement was launched to restore the Shinto priesthood by returning the teaching positions of the so-called "Minsha (民社) priests" below the rank of prefectures and shrines.

This movement was somewhat successful, and on April 26, 1899, the Shrine Division, which was only a division of the Bureau of Shrines and Temples of the Ministry of Home Affairs, was upgraded to the Bureau of Shrines. The Bureau of Religions was also being split off to deal with other religions such as Sect Shinto.

On June 13, 1913, the Bureau of Religions which was run under the Home Ministry, which had jurisdiction over religions other than Shinto shrines, was transferred to the Ministry of Education, Science, Sports and Culture.

The debate was whether Shinto shrines are "non-religious" or "religious". In particular, if shrines were religious, the Ministry of Education, Science, Sports and Culture has jurisdiction over it, and if they were secular, the Home Ministry would have had jurisdiction over them. Some have also arisen as a result of policies adopted by the government to bring religious organizations under the rule of law.

=== 20th century ===
Meiji Shrine priest and general Ichinohe Hyoe advocated categorizing Shinto as a religion:

The world is advancing at a rapid pace. Academic research is gradually expanding its horizons. Since the 19th century, civilizations in both the East and the West have made rapid progress. The study of religion has come to the point where it is no longer possible to accept the position that Shinto faith, shrine Shinto, is not a religion. .... So nowadays, even among the priests of shrines, there is no one who does not admit that shrines and Shinto shrines are religions if they look deep into their hearts.

== Decline ==
As the wartime atmosphere became more intense through the February 26 Incident, May 15 Incident, etc., discussions on secular shrine theory were silenced.

After discussion and deliberation by the Religious System Research Committee established by the Ministry of Education, Science, Sports and Culture, a report was submitted to the legislature on the enactment of the Religious Organizations Law, with the aim of bringing religious organizations under the legal system and having them observe the rules that they have voluntarily established. However, it was repeatedly rejected by the majority. However, through persistent persuasion, with the passage of the Religious Organizations Law by Law No. 77 of April 8, 1939, the legislature legally abandoned the 'Secular Shrine Theory'. Because Sect Shinto was now required by law to be designated and approved.

On November 9, 1940, the Ministry of the Interior reorganized its Bureau of Religions and established the Institute of Divinities, which was able to maintain "Secular Shrine Theory as the national religion". Also, in the Penal Code of the time, the Peace Preservation Law and Lèse-majesté to the Emperor of Japan and Jingu, especially the Special Higher Police suppression of other religions existed.

With this shift, secular shrine theory came to be replaced by a more authoritarian form of State Shinto.

== See also ==
- Political science
- American civil religion – often conceptualized in a similar way
- State Shinto – the resulting policies of this theory
- Shendao shejiao
