= Religious Organizations Law =

Japanese law passed in 1939 that gave authority over religious organizations

The Religious Organizations Law (宗教団体法, Shūkyō Dantai Hō) was a Japanese law passed by the National Diet in 1939 and enacted in 1940. The law gave the state authority control over religious organizations. Following Japan's defeat in World War II, the Religious Organizations Law was repealed on December 28, 1945, and replaced by the "Religious Corporations Ordinance".

== See also ==
- Peace Preservation Law
- Secular Shrine Theory
- Institute of Divinities
- Bureau of Religions
