= Religious Affairs Bureau (disambiguation) =

Religious Affairs Bureau may refer to:

- State Administration for Religious Affairs, a former state institution of the People's Republic of China
- Bureau of Religions, a former state institution of the Empire of Japan
- Presidency of Religious Affairs, a state institution in Turkey
