= Burlap & Barrel =

American spice importer

- Formation: 2017
- Products: Spices

Burlap & Barrel is an American spice importer that sources sustainable, single-origin spices directly from farmers and foragers. It is a public benefit corporation.

== History ==
The company was founded in 2016 by Ori Zohar and Ethan Frisch.

In 2012, while working in Afghanistan for Doctors Without Borders, Frisch saw a vendor in a marketplace tossing cumin into the air to separate it from the chaff. Frisch, who had worked in kitchens, bought some of the cumin, was impressed, and took some home with him when he returned to New York and shared it with chef friends. He interested Zohar, with whom he'd had a previous business.

Frisch had travelled to Zanzibar in 2016 and taken a "spice tour", thinking he would see where spices were grown. Instead he was taken to markets, and when he asked if he could see where the spices were grown, he was told he could not because most of the spices in the markets were imported.

The company name references the traditional packaging for spices.

== Business model ==
The company sources directly from farmers in Guatemala, Iceland, Spain, Turkey, Vietnam, and other places, and its products are single-origin. According to Frisch and Zohar, sourcing directly from the farmers allows the farmers to keep more of the profits. According to Fast Company, the company typically pays farmers between 5 and 20 times the commodity rate.

The company is a public benefit corporation.
