= State Shinto =

Imperial Japan's use of the Shinto religion

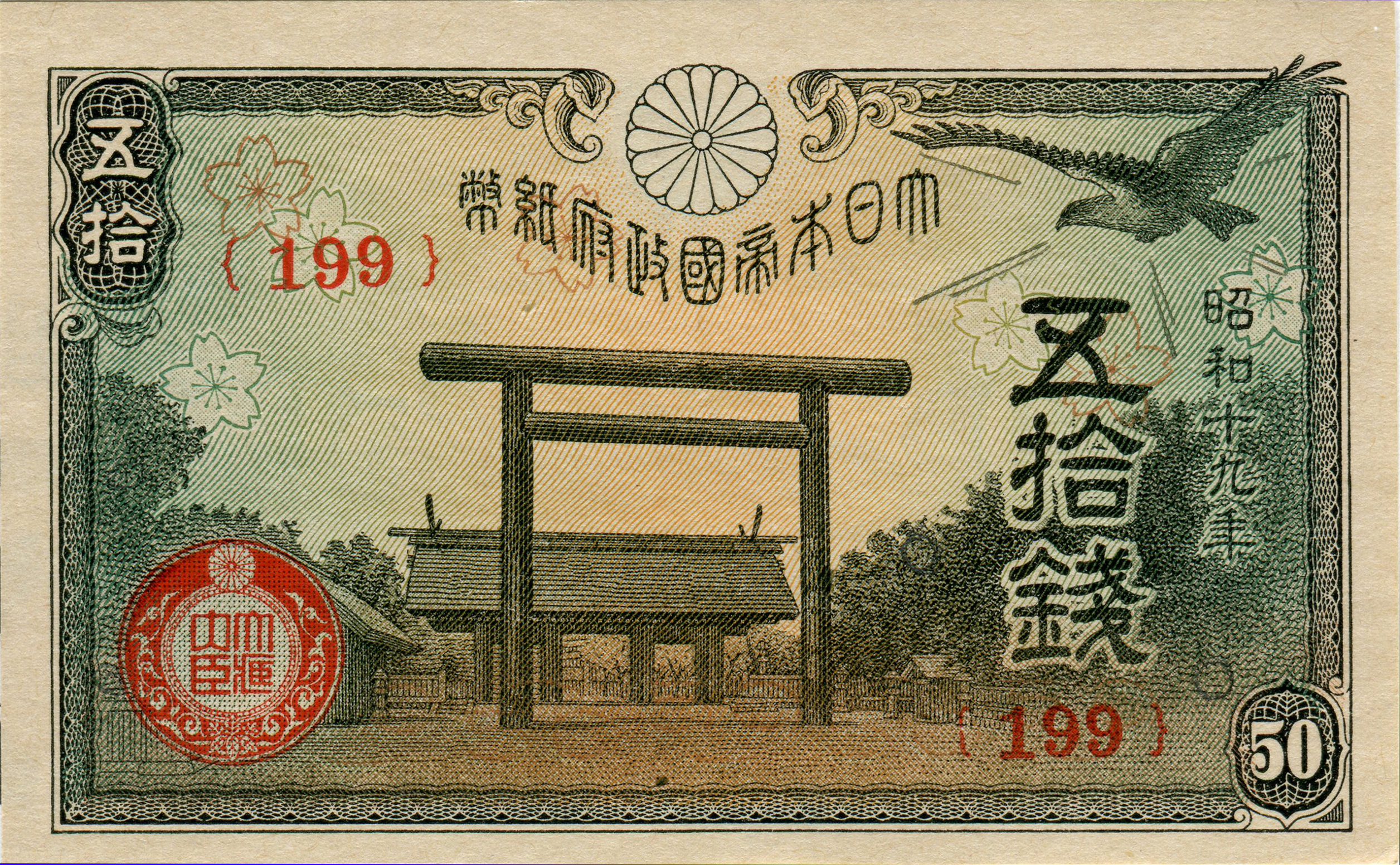
Empire of Japan's 50 sen banknote, featuring Yasukuni Shrine

State Shintō (Japanese: 国家神道, Hepburn: Kokka Shintō; Kyujitai: 國家神道) was Imperial Japan's ideological use of the Japanese folk religion and traditions of Shinto. The state exercised control of shrine finances and training regimes for priests to strongly encourage Shinto practices that emphasized the emperor as a divine being.

The State Shinto ideology emerged at the start of the Meiji era, after government officials defined freedom of religion within the Meiji Constitution. Imperial scholars believed Shinto reflected the historical fact of the Emperor's divine origins rather than a religious belief, and argued that it should enjoy a privileged relationship with the Japanese state. The government argued that Shinto was a non-religious moral tradition and patriotic practice, to give the impression that they supported religious freedom. Though early Meiji-era attempts to unite Shinto and the state failed, this non-religious concept of ideological Shinto was incorporated into state bureaucracy. Shrines were defined as patriotic, not religious, institutions, which served state purposes such as honoring the war dead; this is known as Secular Shrine Theory.

The state also integrated local shrines into political functions, occasionally spurring local opposition and resentment. With fewer shrines financed by the state, nearly 80,000 closed or merged with neighbors. Many shrines and shrine organizations began to independently embrace these state directives, regardless of funding. By 1940, Shinto priests risked persecution for performing traditionally "religious" Shinto ceremonies. Imperial Japan did not draw a distinction between ideological Shinto and traditional Shinto.

US military leaders introduced the term "State Shinto" to differentiate the state's ideology from traditional Shinto practices in the 1945 Shinto Directive. That decree established Shinto as a religion, and banned further ideological uses of Shinto by the state. Controversy continues to surround the use of Shinto symbols in state functions.

== Origins of the term ==
Shinto is a blend of indigenous Japanese folk practices, beliefs, court manners, and spirit-worship which dates back to at least 600 CE. These beliefs were unified as "Shinto" during the Meiji era (1868–1912), though the Chronicles of Japan (日本書紀, Nihon Shoki) first referenced the term in the eighth century. Shinto has no fixed doctrines or founder, but draws instead from creation myths described in books such as the Kojiki.

The December 15, 1945 "Shinto Directive" of the United States General Headquarters introduced the "State Shinto" distinction when it began governing Japan after the Second World War. The Shinto Directive (officially the "Abolition of Governmental Sponsorship, Support, Perpetuation, Control and Dissemination of State Shinto") defined State Shinto as "that branch of Shinto (Kokka Shinto or Jinja Shinto) which, by official acts of the Japanese government, has been differentiated from the religion of Sect Shinto (Shuha Shinto or Kyoha Shinto) and has been classified a non-religious national cult."

The "State Shinto" term was thus used to categorize and abolish Imperial Japanese practices that relied on Shinto to support nationalistic ideology. By declining to ban Shinto practices outright, Japan's post-war constitution was able to preserve full freedom of religion.

== Definitions ==
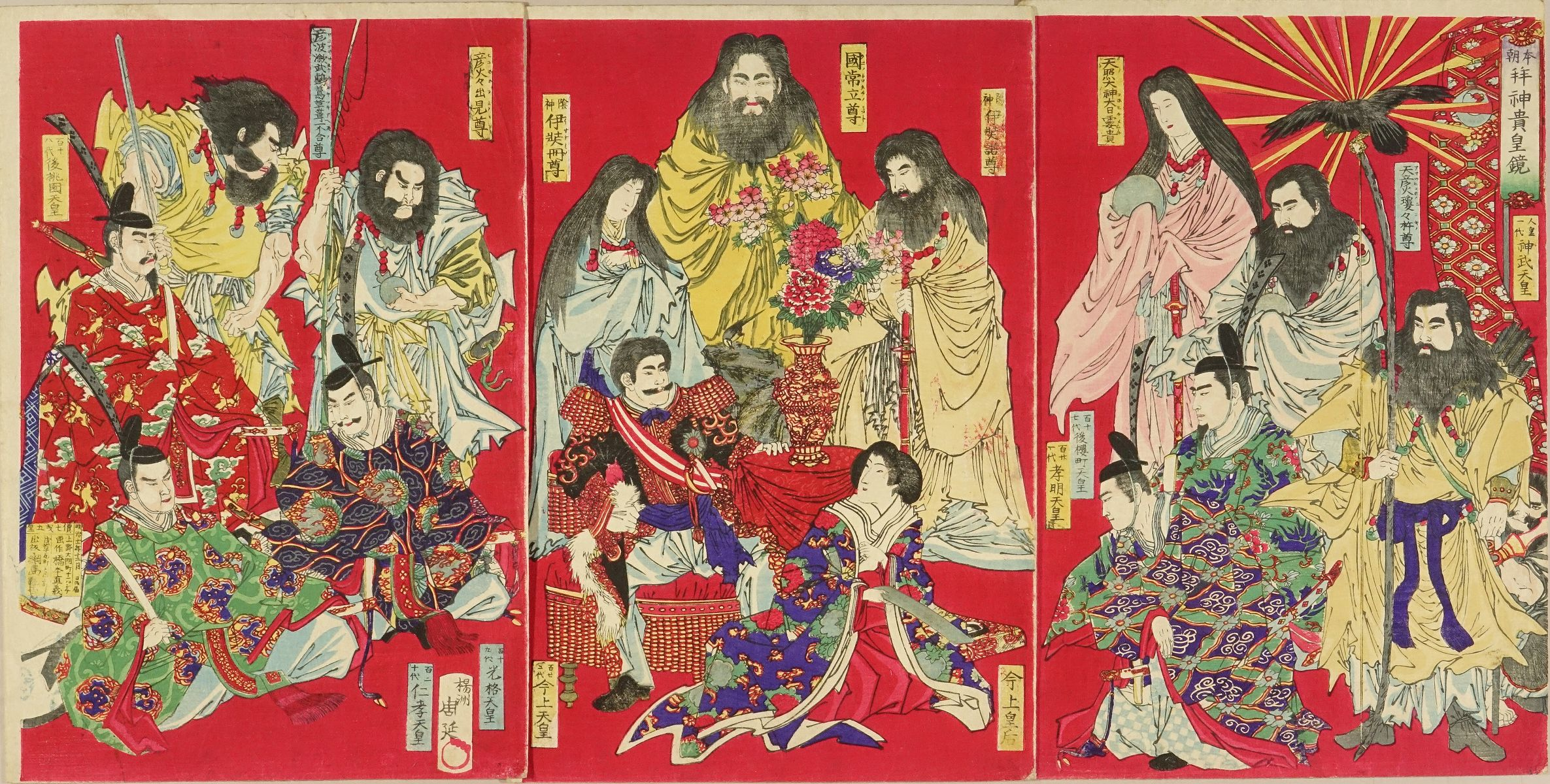
This 1878 engraving by Toyohara Chikanobu (1838–1912) visually presents the central tenet of State Shinto (1871–1946). This Shinto variant asserted and promoted belief in the divinity of the Emperor, which arose from a genealogical family tree extending back to the first emperor and to the most important deities of Japanese mythology.

The definition of State Shinto requires distinction from the term "Shinto", which was one aspect of a set of nationalist symbols integrated into the State Shinto ideology. Though some scholars, such as Woodard and Holtom, and the Shinto Directive itself, use the terms "Shrine Shinto" and "State Shinto" interchangeably, most contemporary scholars use the term "Shrine Shinto" to refer to the majority of Shinto shrines which were outside of State Shinto influence, leaving "State Shinto" to refer to shrines and practices deliberately intended to reflect state ideology.

=== Interpretations ===
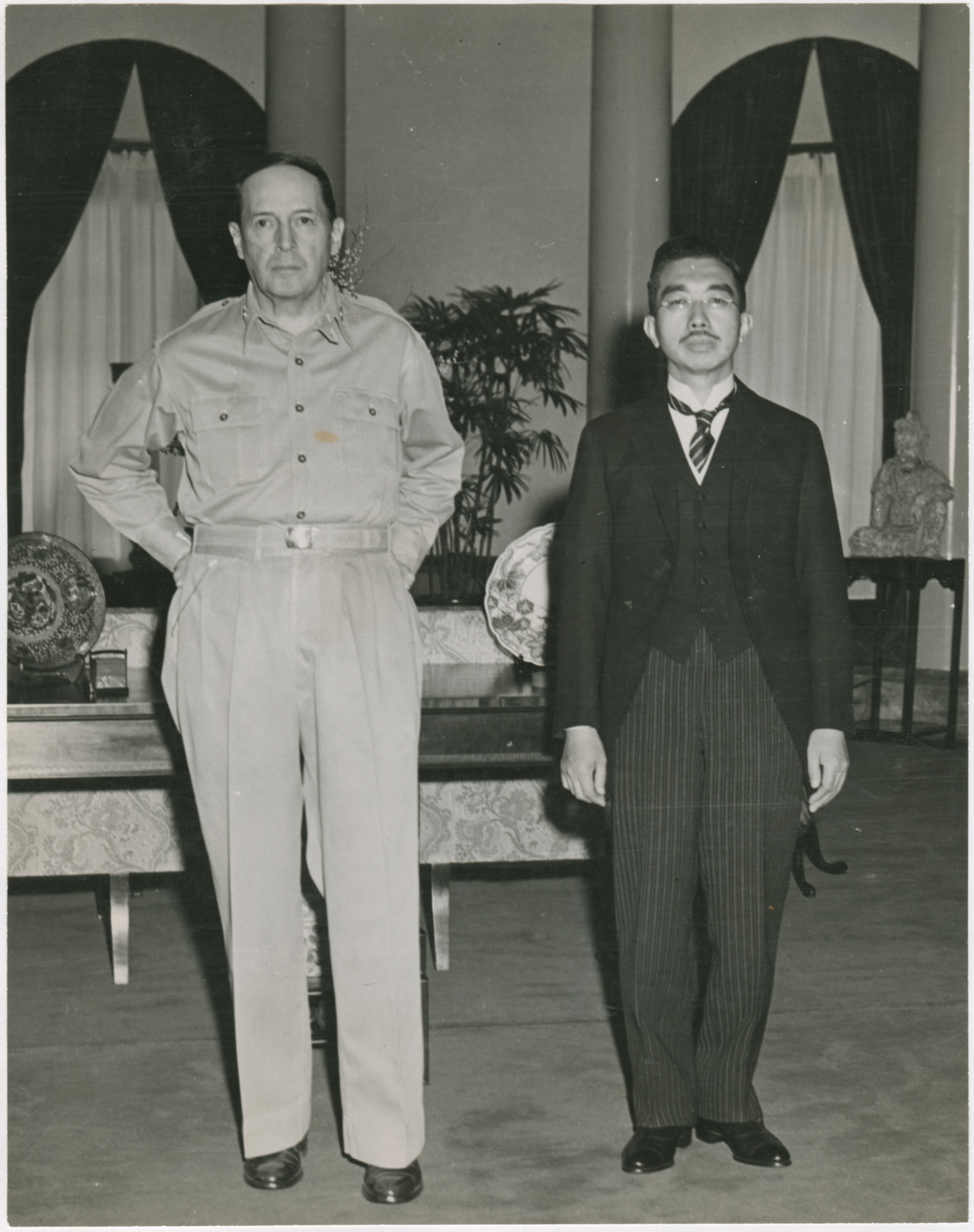
Emperor Hirohito and General MacArthur, at their first meeting, at the U.S. Embassy, Tokyo, 27 September 1945

Most generally, State Shinto refers to any use of Shinto practices incorporated into the national ideology during the Meiji period starting in 1868. It is often described as any state-supported, Shinto-inspired ideology or practice intended to inspire national integration, unity, and loyalty. State Shinto is also understood to refer to the state rituals and ideology of Emperor-worship, which was not a traditional emphasis of Shinto — of the 124 Japanese emperors, only 20 have dedicated shrines.

"State Shinto" was not an official designation for any practice or belief in Imperial Japan during this period. Instead, it was developed at the end of the war to describe the mixture of state support for non-religious shrine activities and immersive ideological support for the Kokutai ("National Body/Structure") policy in education, including the training of all shrine priests. This permitted a form of traditional religious Shinto to reflect a State Shinto position without the direct control of the state. The extent to which Emperor worship was supported by the population is unclear, though scholars such as Ashizu Uzuhiko, Sakamoto Koremaru, and Nitta Hitoshi argue that the government's funding and control of shrines was never adequate enough to justify a claim to the existence of a State Shinto. The extent of popular support for the actions categorized as "State Shinto" is the subject of debate.

Some contemporary Shinto authorities reject the concept of State Shinto, and seek to restore elements of the practice, such as naming time periods after the Emperor. This view often sees "State Shinto" purely as an invention of the United States' "Shinto Directive".

== Shinto as political ideology ==
"Religious" practice, in its Western sense, was unknown in Japan prior to the Meiji restoration. "Religion" was understood to encompass a series of beliefs about faith and the afterlife, but also closely associated with Western power. The Meiji restoration had re-established the Emperor, a "religious" figure, as the head of the Japanese state.

Religious freedom was initially a response to demands of Western governments. Japan had allowed Christian missionaries under pressure from Western governments, but viewed Christianity as a foreign threat. The state was challenged to establish a suprareligious interpretation of Shinto that incorporated, and promoted, the Emperor's divine lineage. By establishing Shinto as a unique form of "suprareligious" cultural practice, it would be exempted from Meiji laws protecting freedom of religion.

The "State Shinto" ideology presented Shinto as something beyond religion, "a unity of government and teaching ... not a religion." Rather than a religious practice, Shinto was understood as a form of education, which "consists of the traditions of the imperial house, beginning in the age of gods and continuing through history."

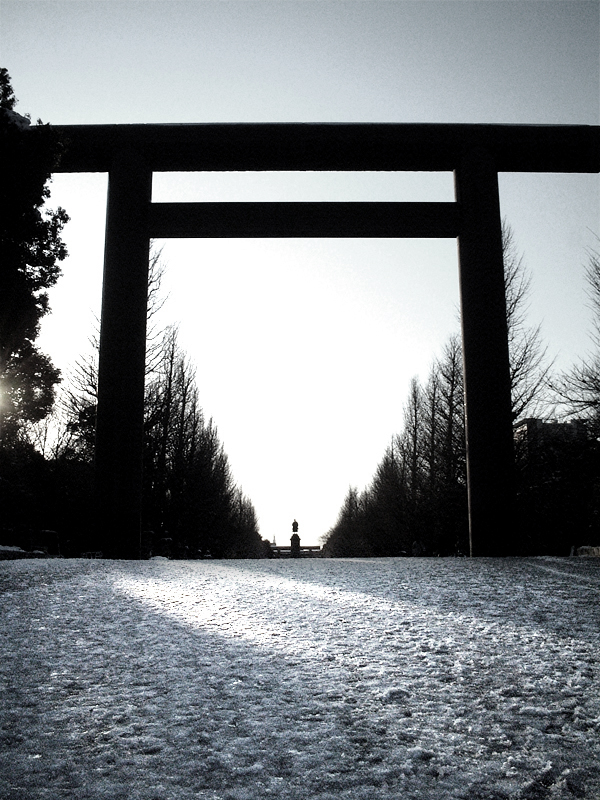
A torii gate at Yasukuni shrine

Scholars, such as Sakamoto Koremaru, argue that the "State Shinto" system existed only between 1900 and 1945, corresponding to the state's creation of the Bureau of Shrines. That bureau distinguished Shinto from religions managed by the Bureau of Shrines and Temples, which became the Bureau of Religions. Separated through this state bureaucracy, Shinto was distinguished from Buddhist temples and Christian churches, which were formulated as religious. This marked the start of the state's official designation of Shinto shrines as "suprareligious" or "non-religious".

State Shinto was thus not recognized as a "state religion" during the Meiji era. Instead, State Shinto is considered an appropriation of traditional Shinto through state financial support for ideologically aligned shrines.

State Shinto combined political activism and religious thought to take actions thought by its adherents to bring the country together during and after the nadir of Japanese feudalism.

== Implementation of Shinto ideology ==
The Empire of Japan endeavored, through education initiatives and specific financial support for new shrines, to frame Shinto practice as a patriotic moral tradition. From the early Meiji era, the divine origin of the Emperor was the official position of the state, and taught in classrooms not as myth, but as historical fact. Shinto priests were hired to teach in public schools, and cultivated this teaching, alongside reverence for the Emperor and compulsory class trips to shrines. State Shinto practitioners also emphasized the ritual aspect as a traditional civic practice that did not explicitly call on faith to participate.

By balancing a "suprareligious" understanding of Shinto as the source of divinity for both Japan and the Emperor, the state was able to compel participation in rituals from Japanese subjects while claiming to respect their freedom of religion. The state was thus able to enshrine its place in civic society in ways religions could not. This included teaching its ideological strand of Shinto in public schools, including ceremonial recitations to the Emperor and rites involving the Emperor's portrait.

In 1926, the government organized the Shūkyō Seido Chōsakai (宗教制度調査会, Religious System Investigative Committee) and then the Jinja Seido Chōsakai (神社制度調査会, Shrine System Investigative Committee), which further established the suprareligious "Shintogaku" ideology.

To protect this non-religious distinction, practices which did not align with state functions were increasingly prohibited. This included preaching at shrines and conducting funerals. The use of the symbolic torii gate was restricted to government-supported shrines. As religious rituals without state functions were restricted, practitioners were driven underground and frequently arrested. Alternative Shinto movements, such as Omotokyo, were hampered by the imprisonment of its priests in 1921. The status of separation of so-called "State Shinto" shrines changed in 1931; from that point, shrines were pressured to focus on the divinity of the Emperor Hirohito or shrine priests could face persecution.

Some intellectuals at the time, such as Yanagita Kunio, were critics of Imperial Japan's argument at the time that Shinto was not religious. In 1936, the Catholic Church's Propaganda Fide agreed with the state definition, and announced that visits to shrines had "only a purely civil value".

== State control of shrines ==
Table: Government spending on shrines
Year	Shrine payments (Yen)	% of annual budget
1902	1,071,727	0.43
1907	510,432	0.08
1912	358,012	0.06
1917	877,063	0.11
1922	4,191,000	0.29
1927	1,774,000	0.1
1932	1,373,000	0.07
1937	2,297,000	0.08
1942	2,081,000	0.02
1943	6,633,000	0.05
1944	1,331,000	0.01

Though the government's ideological interest in Shinto is well-known, there is debate over how much control the government had over local shrines and for how long. Shrine finances were not purely state-supported. Shinto priests, even when state-supported, had tended to avoid preaching on ideological matters until the establishment of the Institute of Divinities in 1940.

In 1906, the government issued a policy to limit its financial support to one shrine per village. This state supported shrines that followed its specific guidelines for funding, and encouraged unfunded shrines to become partners with the larger shrines. As a result of this initiative to consolidate Shinto beliefs into state-approved practices, Japan's 200,000 shrines had been reduced to 120,000 by 1914, consolidating control to shrines favorable to the state interpretation of Shinto.

In 1910, graduates of state-run Shinto schools, such as Kokugakuin University and Kougakkan University, were implicitly allowed to become public school teachers. A greater number of better-trained priests with educations at state-supported schools, combined with a rising patriotic fervor, is believed by some to have seeded an environment in which grassroots Emperor worship was possible, even without financial support for local shrines.

In 1913, official rules for Shrine priests — Kankokuheisha ika jinja shinshoku hömu kisoku (官国幣社以下神社神 職奉務規則) — specifically called upon "a duty to observe festivals conforming to the rituals of the state." Some shrines did adopt State Shinto practice independent of financial support from the government. Several Shrine Associations advocated for support of "State Shinto" directives independently, including the Shrine Administration Organization, the Shrine Priest Collaboration Organization, and the Shrine Priest Training Organization.

In 1940, the state created the Institute of Divinities, which expanded control over state shrines and expanded the state's role. Up to that point, individual priests had been limited in their political roles, delegated to certain rituals and shrine upkeep, and rarely encouraged Emperor worship, or other aspects of state ideology, independently. No shrine priest, or member of the Institute of Divinities, had previously sought public office, which some scholars, such as Sakamoto, suggest is evidence of the state's use of Shinto to its own ends, rather than the Shinto priest's attempt to achieve political power.

== Ideological origins ==
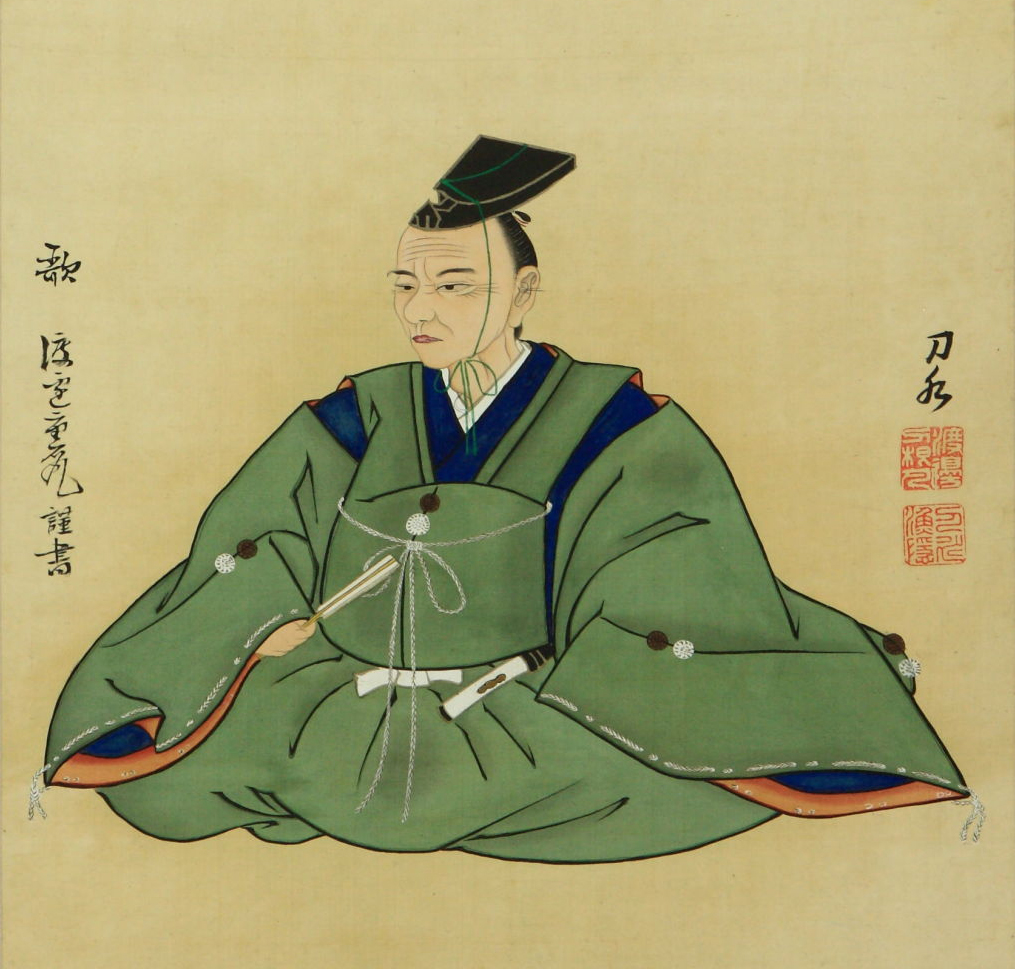
Portrait of Atsutane Hirata, hanging scroll

Scholar Katsurajima Nobuhiro suggests the "suprareligious" frame on State Shinto practices drew upon the state's previous failures to consolidate religious Shinto for state purposes.

Kokugaku ("National Learning") was an early attempt to develop ideological interpretations of Shinto, many of which would later form the basis of "State Shinto" ideology. Kokugaku was an Edo-period educational philosophy which sought a "pure" form of Japanese Shinto, stripped of foreign influences — particularly Buddhism.

In the Meiji era, scholar Hirata Atsutane advocated for a return to "National Learning" as a way to eliminate the influence of Buddhism and distill a nativist form of Shinto. From 1868 to 1884, the disciples of Atsutane, along with other priests and scholars, led a "Great Promulgation Campaign" advocating a fusion of nationalism and Shinto through worship of the Emperor. There had been no tradition of absolute obedience to the Emperor in Shinto since the early state-formation period, prior to the introduction of Buddhism. This initiative failed to attract public support, and intellectuals dismissed the idea. Author Fukuzawa Yukichi dismissed the campaign at the time as an "insignificant movement".

Despite its failure, Atsutane's nativist interpretation of Shinto would encourage a later scholar, Ōkuni Takamasa. Takamasa advocated control and standardization of Shinto practice through the "Department of Divinity". These activists urged leaders to consolidate diverse, localized Shinto practices into a standardized national practice, which they argued would unify Japan in support of the Emperor.

The state responded by passing the Kami and Buddhas Separation Order (神仏判然令, Shinbutsu Hanzenrei) in 1868 and pursuing a policy of Haibutsu kishaku to remove Buddhist influence and re-establishing direct imperial control of the Department of Divinity ("jingikan") in 1869. This government bureaucracy encouraged the segregation of Kami spirits from Buddhist ones, and emphasized the divine lineage of the Emperor from the Sun Goddess, Amaterasu. This action sought to reverse what had been a blending of Buddhist and Shinto practices in Japan. That department was unsuccessful, and demoted to the Ministry of Divinities. In 1872, policy for shrines and other religions was taken over by the Ministry of Religion. The Ministry intended to standardize rituals across shrines, and saw some small success, but fell short of its original intent.

=== National Teaching ===
In calling for the return of the Department of Divinities in 1874, a group of Shinto priests issued a collective statement calling Shinto a "National Teaching". That statement advocated for understanding Shinto as distinct from religions. Shinto, they argued, was a preservation of the traditions of the Imperial house and therefore represented the purest form of Japanese state rites. These scholars wrote,

National Teaching is teaching the codes of national government to the people without error. Japan is called the divine land because it is ruled by the heavenly deities' descendants, who consolidate the work of the deities. The Way of such consolidation and rule by divine descendants is called Shinto.

— Signed by various Shinto leaders, 1874, Source material

Signatories of the statement included Shinto leaders, practitioners and scholars such as Tanaka Yoritsune, chief priest of Ise shrine; Motoori Toyokai, head of Kanda shrine; and Hirayama Seisai, head of a major tutelary shrine in Tokyo. Nonetheless, this concept of Shinto as a "National Learning" failed to take hold in most popular conceptions of Shinto.

=== Great Promulgation Campaign ===
The Bureau of Shinto Affairs attempted to standardize the training of priests in 1875. This created a division between state actors and local priests, who disagreed over the content of that standardized training. This debate concerned which kami, or spirits, to include in rituals— particularly, whether state kami should be included. This debate marked the rise of the Ise sect, which was open to a stronger state presence in Shinto, and the Izumo sect, which was not. The Izumo sect advocated for recognition of the god Ōkuninushi as an equal to Amaterasu, which had theological consequences for emperor-worship. This debate, the "enshrinement debate", posed a serious ideological threat to the Meiji era government.

A result of the enshrinement debate was that the Ministry of the Interior concentrated on distinctions of "religion" and "doctrine", stating that "Shinto rituals (shinsai) are performed by the state whereas religious doctrines (kyōhō) are to be followed by individuals and families." Through this logic, Shinto rituals were a civic responsibility which all Japanese subjects were expected to participate in, whereas "religious" Shinto was a matter of personal faith and subject to freedom of religion. This debate marked an early failure in crafting of a unified national Shinto practice, and led to a sharp decline in both state grants to Shinto shrines and to the appointment of Shinto priests to government positions. This was the beginning of Secular Shrine Theory which explained the obligations unrelated to belief, and segregation Sect Shinto or groups based on beliefs.. The Ministry of Home Affairs took responsibility for shrines in 1877, and began to separate Shinto religious practices from indoctrination. In 1887, the Ministry stopped financial support for most shrines, aside from select Imperial shrines tied to state functions. This distinction between state ritual and personal doctrine eventually crystallized into the formal Shintō jūsanpa ("Thirteen Sects of Shinto") system, comprising Kurozumikyō, Shinto Shūseiha, Izumo Ōyashirokyō, Fusōkyō, Jikkōkyō, Shinshūkyō, Shinto Taiseikyō, Ontakekyō, Shinto Taikyō, Misogikyō, Shinrikyō, Konkōkyō, and Tenrikyō, several of which, including Kurozumikyō, Misogikyō, Konkōkyō, and Tenrikyō, had already emerged as independent movements in the late Tokugawa shogunate but developed fully organized doctrines and institutional structures only during the Meiji era.

=== Yasukuni Shrine ===
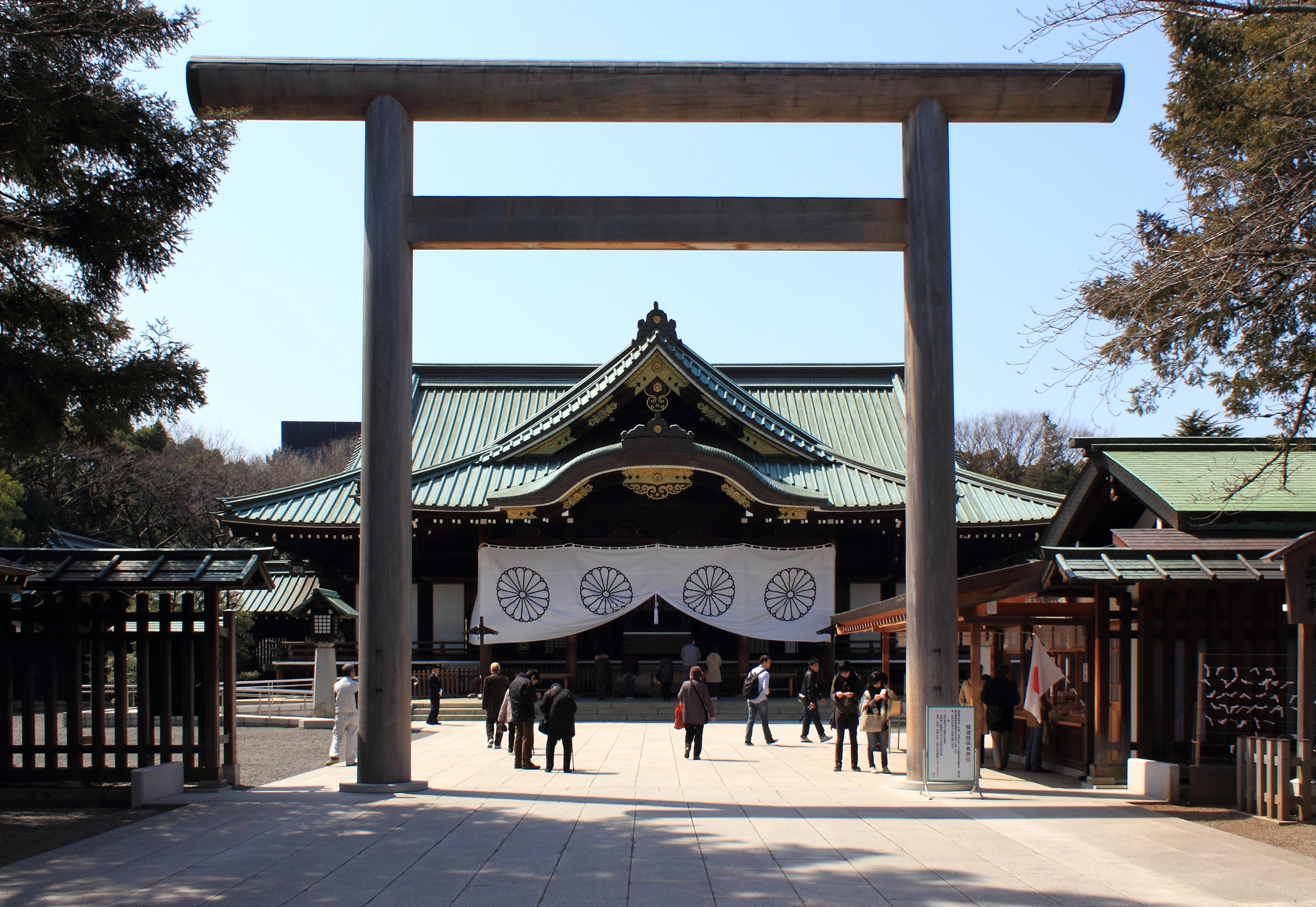
Yasukuni Shrine

In 1869 Yasukuni Shrine was first built under the name Tōkyō Shōkonsha (東京招魂社, "shrine to summon the souls").

It was originally not used often. For example, in the 1874 Japanese invasion of Taiwan in which only 12 people were enshrined in Yasukuni Shrine.

However following the 1877 Satsuma Rebellion, the Emperor had 6,959 souls of war dead enshrined at Tōkyō Shōkonsha. In 1879, the shrine was renamed Yasukuni Jinja. The name Yasukuni, quoted from the phrase "吾以靖國也" in the classical-era Chinese text Zuo Zhuan (Scroll 6, 23rd Year of Duke Xi), literally means "Pacifying the Nation" and was chosen by the Meiji Emperor.

Around this time, the state began to assign shrines with meanings rooted in patriotic nationalism; including a network of shrines dedicated to soldiers killed in battle. These assignments had no connection to the history of these local shrines, which led to resentment.

In contemporary times, the shrine has become a controversial symbol for Japanese nationalists. While many citizens of various political persuasions visit the site to honor relatives killed in battle, whose kami (spirits) are said to be enshrined there, so too are the kami of several class-A war criminals. These criminals were enshrined in a secret ceremony in 1978, which has raised the ire of Japanese pacifists and the international community.

No Emperor has visited the shrine since, and visits by prime ministers and government officials to the shrine have been the subject of lawsuits and media controversy.

== In acquired and occupied territories ==
The Empire of Japan at its peak territorial holdings, in 1942

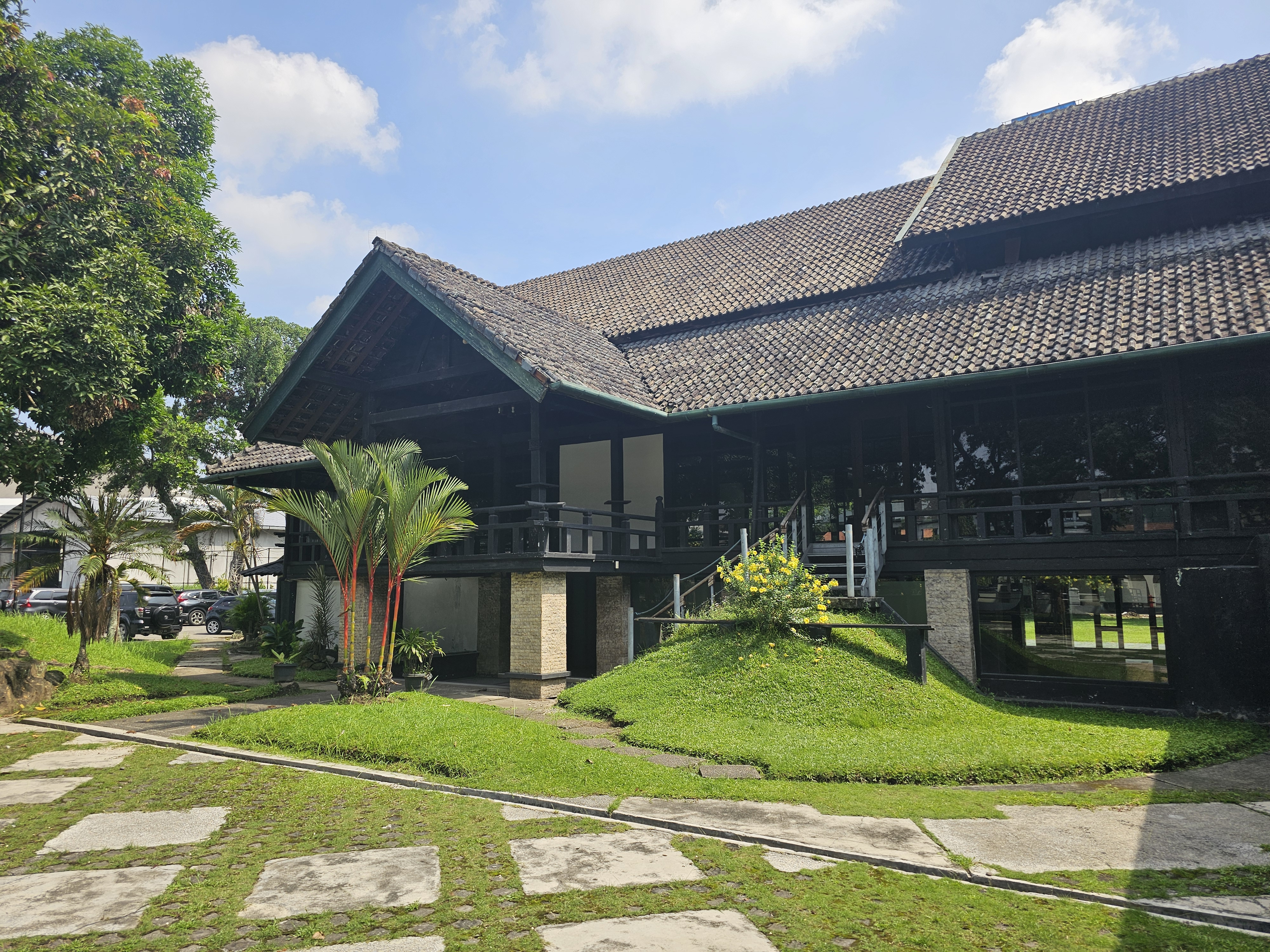
Hirohara Jinja's shamusho stands as one of the last Shinto shrine structures still intact in Southeast Asia after World War II

As the Japanese extended their territorial holdings, shrines were constructed with the purpose of hosting Japanese kami in occupied lands. This practice began with Naminoue Shrine in Okinawa in 1890. Major shrines built across Asia included Karafuto Shrine in Sakhalin in 1910 and Chosen Shrine, Korea, in 1919; these shrines were designated just under Ise Shrine in national importance. Other shrines included Shonan Shrine in Singapore, San'a Shrine in Hainan Island (China), Nankai Shrine in Hong Kong, Japanese Shrine in Kolonia, Federated States of Micronesia, Akatsuki Shrine in Saigon, the Hokoku Shrine in Java and the Yorioka Shrine in Sarawak.

The Japanese built almost 400 shrines in occupied Korea, and worship was mandatory for Koreans. A statement from the head of the Home Office in Korea wrote about the shrines in a directive: "...they have an existence totally distinct from religion, and worship at the shrines is an act of patriotism and loyalty, the basic moral virtues of our nation."

By 1937, more than 500,000 Jingu Taima shrines had been set up across households in Taiwan. Out of the 68 approved places of worship, 38 were constructed between 1937 and 1943. Schools and organizations were ordered to worship there.

In Manchuria, The Japanese conducted scholarly research on the local folk religion and built 366 Shrines, although without trying to impose Shinto on the native population as was the case in Korea and Taiwan, as the Manchurian State was conceived as a spiritually autonomous nation; while in the rest of the Chinese territory occupied by the Japanese, it is estimated that there are at least 51 shrines.

At least fifteen State Shinto shrines were established in the South Seas Mandate in the late 1920s and early 1930s. Shinto was primarily practised by Japanese settlers, but also by indigenous populations. The shrine at Jabor on Jaluit Atoll in the Marshall Islands was reportedly the easternmost shrine in the Japanese Empire. There were seven shrines built in the Mariana Islands, while other shrines were built on the more remote islands of Kosrae, Truk, Ponape, Yap and Lamotrek. The largest shrine in the mandate territories was the Nan'yō Shrine in Palau, with its significant Japanese population. It was located on the outskirts of Koror and dedicated in 1940.

During the Second World War, Shinto shrines were built across Southeast Asia as Japan expanded southwards. Countries such as the Philippines, Singapore, Malaya, and Indonesia witnessed the presence of Shinto shrines due to the imposition of State Shinto. In Indonesia alone, 11 shrines were constructed. Chinnan Shrine in Malang, Java, was the southernmost Shinto shrine in Asia until its destruction in 1945. Hirohara Shrine in Medan is the last remaining Shinto shrine in Southeast Asia.

== Post-war ==
On 1 January 1946, Emperor Shōwa issued a statement, sometimes referred to as the Humanity Declaration, in which he quoted the Five Charter Oath of Emperor Meiji, announced that he was not an Akitsumikami (a divinity in human form) and that Japan was not built on myths. The U.S. General Headquarters quickly defined and banned practices it identified as "State Shinto", but because the U.S. saw freedom of religion as a crucial aspect of post-war Japan it did not place a full ban on Japanese religious ceremonies involving the Emperor. General Douglas MacArthur and the State Department sought to maintain the authority of the Emperor to avoid "lasting resentment" among the Japanese people during the occupation and reconstruction of Japan.

The Shinto Directive stated it was established to "free the Japanese people from direct or indirect compulsion to believe or profess to believe in a religion or cult officially designated by the state" and "prevent a recurrence of the perversion of Shinto theory and beliefs into militaristic and ultranationalistic propaganda".

Today, while the Imperial House continues to perform Shinto rituals as "private ceremonies", participation and belief are no longer obligatory for Japanese citizens, nor funded by the state.

Other aspects of the government's "suprareligious" enforcement of Shinto practices, such as school trips to Shinto shrines, were forbidden. Many innovations of Meiji-era Shinto are present in contemporary Shinto, such as a belief among priests that Shinto is a non-religious cultural practice that encourages national unity.

=== Controversies ===
Controversy has emerged during the funerals and weddings of members of the Japanese Imperial Family (Imperial House of Japan), as they present a merging of Shinto and state functions. The Japanese treasury does not pay for these events, which preserves the distinction between state and shrine functions.

The Association of Shinto Shrines is politically active in encouraging support for the Emperor, including campaigns such as distributing amulets from Ise Shrine. Ise Shrine was one of the most important shrines in State Shinto, symbolizing Amaterasu's presence and connection to the Emperor. In contrast, the Meiji-era Yasukuni Shrine is frequently the target of State Shinto controversies, mostly owing to its enshrinement of Japanese war criminals.

Conservative politicians and nationalist interest groups continue to advocate for returning the Emperor to a central political and religious position, which they believe will restore a national sense of unity.

== See also ==
- Kokutai
- Emperor of Japan
- Positive Christianity
- Shinto sects and schools
- Yasukuni Shrine controversy
- Statism in Shōwa Japan
- Nippon Kaigi
- Secular Shrine Theory
- State religion
- Religion in politics
