= National Association of Shinto Priests =

Japanese Shinto religious association

- Successor: Association of Shinto Shrines
- Formation: 1889
- Parent organization: Office of Japanese Classics Research

The National Association of Shinto Priests (全国神職会, Zenkoku Shinshokukai) was a Japanese religious association that promoted the prosperity of Shinto shrines and the improvement and development of the Shinto priesthood. It was founded in 1898 to expound the Kokutai ideology. It was dissolved in 1946 with the formation of the religious corporation, which became one of the predecessor organizations of the Association of Shinto Shrines.

It was responsible for the distribution of Jingu Taima.

The Association of Shinto Shrines is considered its successor organization post WWII.

== Outline ==
The members were about 15,000 Shinkan priests who serve at Ise Grand Shrine, Modern system of ranked Shinto shrines and other shrines in Japan. In addition, other officials related to shrine administration, academics, and those who have rendered distinguished service to the Society are nominated as honorary members or special members. The office was located in Office of Japanese Classics Research (Iidacho, Kojimachi-ku; Wakagi-cho, Shibuya-ku since 1923), but in 1932, through the efforts of Chairman Sen'yuki Egi and others, it was relocated to Tokyo City Shibuya Ward, and moved there. There were 15 directors (including 1 president and 2 vice-presidents) and 3 auditors, and the councilors, who were the voting body, were from each of the prefectures, Korea, Taiwan, Sakhalin, and Kwantung Leased Territory. Its activities include research and study of matters related to shrines, educational facilities necessary for the cultivation of the concept of kokutai and the idea of respect for the gods, training of priests, awards, mutual aid, etc. Its journal is "Zenkoku Shinkyo Kaiho", later renamed "Kohoku", and later renamed "Kohoku Jiho" (published on a seasonal basis).

== History ==
The Shinkan Doshikai, a federation of Shinto priests, was formed in 1889 as a result of public opinion for the restoration of the Shinto priesthood, and in a series of movements, the Shinkan Doshikai was organized in 1898. In 1889, a federation of Shinto priests, the National Association of Shinto Priests, was formed in response to public opinion for the revival of the Shinto priesthood. Since then, efforts have been made to establish special government offices mainly for the Shinto gods, and to maintain the Office of Japanese Classics Research. Subsequently, a fund was built up with contributions from local priesthood organizations and leading shrines, and in 1926, the foundation was established. In 1930, a proposal was made to construct a hall, and with the help of donations from philanthropists, the construction of the hall was begun in 1931. On February 11, 1932, it received a special gift on the occasion of Kiwansei Season.
