= Institute of Divinities =

Former Japanese state Shinto organization

- 神祇院

Agency overview
- Formed: November 9, 1940; 84 years ago
- Preceding agency: Bureau of Shrines, Jingu-kyo
- Dissolved: January 31, 1946; 79 years ago
- Superseding agency: Association of Shinto Shrines
- Headquarters: 1-2 Kasumigaseki, Kojimachi-ku, Tokyo-shi
- Agency executives: Eiji Yasui, President; Ichisho Inuma, Vice President
- Parent agency: Home Ministry
- Key document: SCAPIN-448

The Institute of Divinities (神祇院, Jingi-in) is one of the former state agencies of Japan, in the Ministry of the Interior's foreign bureau. Its purpose was to increase the prestige of Shintoism among the people and it was the core of shrine administration and Shintoism until the end of WWII.

Showa's early Divinities revival movement and movement to establish special divine offices In response to the 1940, it was established on the occasion of the commemoration of the 2,600th anniversary of the accession of Jimmu in 1940. After the defeat of Japan in World War II, the Shinto Directive was issued by the Supreme Commander for the Allied Powers (GHQ), and the Shinto Directive was terminated on January 31, 1946, and the Institute was abolished on the same day.

== Establishment ==
In accordance with the Government Regulations of the Institute of Shinto Religion (Imperial Ordinance No. 736 of 1940), the Bureau of Shrines of the Home Ministry was elevated to a higher rank and established as an external bureau of the Ministry on November 9, 1940. It is located at 1-2, Kasumigaseki, Kojimachi-ku, Tokyo (Ministry of Home Affairs Office Building).

The president was appointed by the Minister of Home Affairs, and Eiji Yasui, Minister of Home Affairs, was appointed as the first president. The Vice President was Ichisho Inuma, Director General of the Bureau of Shrines, who served in this position until the abolition of the JCG.

The President's Secretariat, the General Affairs Bureau, and the Political Affairs Bureau were established to take charge of matters related to the Jingu shrine, matters related to shrines under the government and national government, matters related to priests and priesthood, and matters related to the spread of reverence for the Shinto religion.

== Shinto Directive and abolition ==
On December 15, 1945, GHQ issued a memorandum to the government, "Regarding the Abolition of the Government's Guarantee, Support, Preservation, Supervision, and Supervision of National Shinto and Shinto Shrines and the Abolition of Kobu" (SCAPIN-448), which resulted in the abolition of the Institute of Divinities.

The Institute of Divinities was abolished on January 31, 1946, in accordance with the Imperial Ordinance No. 59 of 1946, which concerned the revision of government regulations for administrative reorganization. Except for some of the former government-owned shrines that do not have an encompassing relationship, most of the jurisdiction over shrines was transferred to the religious corporation Association of Shinto Shrines established on February 3 by the Office of Japanese Classics Research, National Association of Shinto Priests and Jingu-kyo.

== See also ==
- State Shinto
- Shrine Shinto
- Department of Divinities
- Ministry of Divinities

== Literature ==
- 国立国会図書館 デジタルコレクション 神社祭式行事作法 内務省神祇院教務局祭務課編集 昭和17年 書誌ID 000000664653 P15 https://dl.ndl.go.jp/info:ndljp/pid/1040190/1
- 国立国会図書館 デジタルコレクション 告示 / 内務省 / 第76号 / 神社祭式行事作法 明治40年 https://dl.ndl.go.jp/info:ndljp/pid/2950545
- 国立国会図書館 デジタルコレクション 神社局時代を語る 神祇院教務局調査課 昭和17年 https://dl.ndl.go.jp/info:ndljp/pid/1057614
- 国立国会図書館 デジタルコレクション 神社本義 神祇院編集 昭和19年 https://dl.ndl.go.jp/info:ndljp/pid/1040153
- 国立国会図書館 デジタルコレクション 神奈川県内政部 / 神社祭式行事作法解説 昭和18年 P21 22 23 https://dl.ndl.go.jp/info:ndljp/pid/1097500
