= Bureau of Shrines =

Former Japanese government agency

- Predecessor: Bureau of Shrines and Temples
- Successor: Institute of Divinities
- Formation: April 26, 1900; 126 years ago
- Dissolved: November 9, 1940; 85 years ago
- Parent organization: Home Ministry

The Bureau of Shrines (神社局, Jinjakyoku) was an internal department of the Home Ministry that existed until 1940. It was in charge of administrative matters related to shrines, shinkan, and kannushi.

It was split off from the Bureau of Shrines and Temples in 1900 with other religions and Sect Shinto being covered under the Bureau of Religions.

On April 26, 1900, under the basic policy of the Meiji Restoration government that "shrines are the state's religious ceremonies," the Home Ministry's Bureau of Shrines and Temples was abolished and reorganized into the Bureau of Shrines, which oversaw State Shinto, and the Bureau of Religions, which oversaw other religions including Buddhism, and Sect Shinto. In short, the Home Ministry's official regulations were revised, seven bureaus were established within it, the Bureau of Shrines was added before the regional bureaus, and the Bureau of Shrines and Temples was renamed the Bureau of Religion. The Bureau of Shrines was criticized by the Shin Buddhism sect, despite it not being a very large organization.

It was staffed by one director, one secretary, one archivist, two engineers, one clerk, two assistant archivists, and others.

It was abolished on November 9, 1940 with the establishment of the Institute of Divinities.

== Bibliography ==
- 秦郁彦編『日本官僚制総合事典：1868 - 2000』東京大学出版会、2001年。

== See also ==
- Department of Divinities
- Ministry of Religion (Japan)
- State Shinto
- Association of Shinto Shrines
