= Church and State =

Church and State may refer to:

== Common uses ==
- Separation of church and state
- Church and state in medieval Europe
- Relations between the Catholic Church and the state
- Religion in politics
- State religion, a religion or creed officially endorsed by a sovereign state
  - Confessional state, a state which practises a state religion

== Comics and literature ==
- Church and State (comics), a graphic novel by Dave Sim in the Cerebus comic book series
- "Church and State" (essay), an 1886 essay by Leo Tolstoy
- Church & State, a magazine of Americans United for Separation of Church and State
- Church and State Gazette, an English newspaper
- Journal of Church and State, an American academic journal

== Television ==
- "Church and State" (Succession), an episode of the television series Succession
- "Church and State", an episode of the television series Our Cartoon President
- "Church and State", an episode of the television series Under the Banner of Heaven

== Other uses ==
- Church and State (Australia) (CAS), a conservative Christian political lobby group
