= Association of Shinto Shrines =

Religious organization in Japan

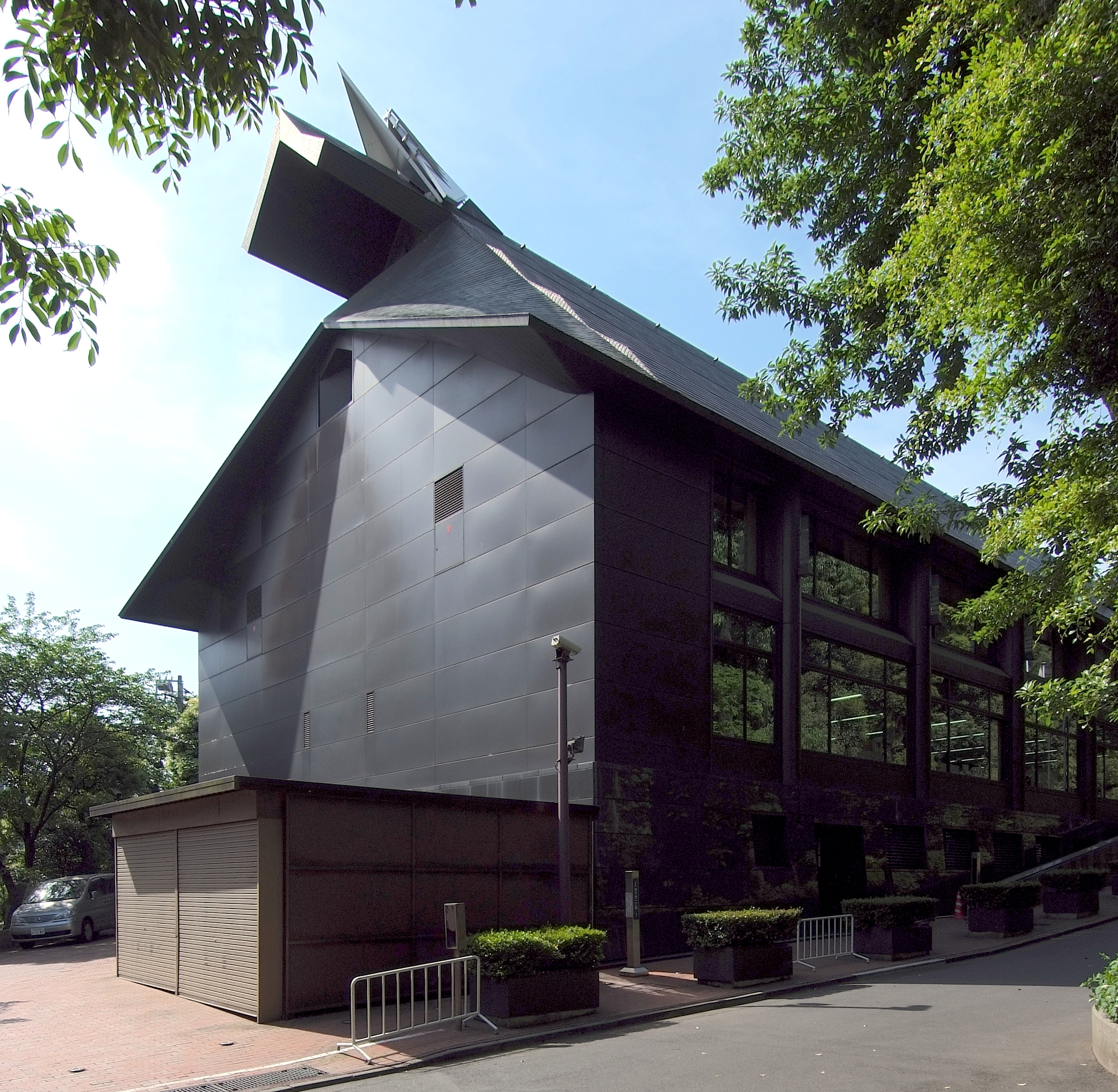
- The headquarters of the association in Shibuya, Tokyo
- Predecessor: Office of Japanese Classics Research, Institute of Divinities, Jingu-kyo, National Association of Shinto Priests

The Association of Shinto Shrines (神社本庁, Jinja Honchō) is a religious administrative organisation that oversees about 80,000 Shinto shrines in Japan. These shrines take the Ise Grand Shrine as the foundation of their belief. It is the largest Shrine Shinto organization in existence.

== Description ==
The association has five major activities, in addition to numerous others:

- Publication and dissemination of information on Shrine Shinto;
- The performance of rituals;
- Education of adherents to Shinto;
- Reverence of Ise Grand Shrine and the distribution of its amulets called Jingū Taima (神宮大麻); and
- Preparation and training of individuals for the Shinto priesthood.

It currently has an administrative structure including a main office and branches. Its headquarters in Yoyogi, Shibuya, Tokyo, adjacent to Meiji Shrine. Its leadership includes the Sosai (総裁), or honorary governor, the former supreme priestess of the Ise Shrine, Atsuko Ikeda. The tōri (統理) is Naotake Takatsukasa, and the post of sōchō (総長) or Secretary-General is currently held by Tsunekiyo Tanaka, the chief priest of the Iwashimizu Hachimangū. The association maintains regional offices in every prefecture. They handle financial and personnel matters for member shrines.

The Association's central structure includes an administrative bureau (Jimu Sōkyoku), which oversees training courses for those seeking to become shinshoku, and a theological research centre (Kyōgaku Kenkyūjo), which conducts doctrinal research, opinion surveys, and collects study materials. It has also established advanced training programmes at Kokugakuin and Kogakkan Universities, along with six regional courses, including the Jingū Kenshūjo and the Atsuta Jingū Gakuin.

== Overview ==
The Association of Shinto Shrines is the largest Shinto religious group in Japan, and more than 79,000 of the approximately 80,000 Japanese shrines, including major ones, are members. Each prefecture has a shrine office. It is the successor to the Institute of Divinities, which was an external agency of the Home Ministry, and is a comprehensive religious corporation based on the Religious Corporation Law.

In Article 3 of the "Regulations of the Religious Corporation 'Jinja Honcho' Agency," the regulations of the Agency as a religious corporation, the purpose of the Agency is to manage and guide shrines under its jurisdiction, promote Shinto, perform shrine rituals, educate and foster believers (Ujiko), support Ise Shrine, the head shrine, train priests, and conduct public relations through the publication and distribution of pamphlets, among other activities.

== Doctrine ==
=== Association of Shinto Shrine Charter ===
The Association of Shinto Shrines is a comprehensive religious corporation of about 80,000 companies nationwide. Each shrine has its own history, and there are various religious beliefs such as Yawata belief and Inari belief, and it was very difficult to establish one doctrine. Therefore, on May 21, 1980 (Showa 55), the "Association of Shinto Shrine Charter" was established by a decision of the Councilors. The background and position of this is stated in the preamble, "The important concern to date has been to establish and maintain basic norms as a tie for spiritual integration." At the time of enforcement of this Charter, the agency rules and previous rules, etc. shall be deemed to have been established based on this Charter."

Article 1 states, "The Association of Shinto Shrines respects tradition, promotes rituals and promotes morality, prays for the prosperity of the great lord, and contributes to the peace of the four seas."

=== Platform for Respectful Life ===
Prior to the "Association of Shinto Shrine Charter", the "Platform of Respectful Life" was enacted in 1956 to show the practical spirit of the Association of Shinto Shrines.

Shinto is an eternal road of heaven and earth, and is the basis for cultivating a noble spirit and opening the Taihei.

It is the reason for achieving the mission to be afraid of the gods, to follow the ancestral lessons, to finally demonstrate the essence of the road, and to promote the welfare of humankind. It is hoped that this code will be put up here to clarify the direction and to put it into practice and proclaim the road.

To thank God for the grace and grace of our ancestors, to attend rituals with a clear and clean spirit, to serve for the sake of the world, and to create and solidify the world as the will of God.

We pray for the coexistence and co-prosperity of the country and the world.

There is no codified doctrine in the Association of Shinto Shrines, but according to the "Commentary on the Charter of the Association of Shinto Shrines", the Association of Shinto Shrines is the spirit of its establishment and activities with the "Association of Shinto Shrines" and the "Platform of Respectful Life".

== History ==
The Association was established following the Surrender of Japan at the end of World War II. On 15 December 1945, the Supreme Commander for the Allied Powers (SCAP) issued the Shinto Directive, ordering the Disestablishment of Shinto as a state religion. On February 2, 1946, to comply with the SCAP order, three organizations – the Kōten Kōkyūjo (皇典講究所), Dainippon Jingikai (大日本神祇会), and Jingū Hōsaikai (神宮奉斎会) – established the nongovernmental Association, assuming the functions of the Institute of Divinities, a branch of the Home Ministry.

In accordance with the Shinto Directive, 1946 (Showa 21) January 23, National Association of Shinto Priests, the Office of Japanese Classics Research, and the Jingūkyō, took the lead to establish the Jinja Honcho.

In 1952, regulations governing the Association were published, and in 1987 its headquarters relocated to their present site in the Yoyogi area of Shibuya.

=== Political links ===
The Association has many contacts within the Liberal Democratic Party and is a successful lobbyist; its influence can be seen in recent conservative legislation, like the legal recognition of the National Flag (Hinomaru) and National Anthem (Kimigayo), their use for official school events, or the revision of Fundamental Education Law, and it is behind some actions by conservative politicians, like visits to Yasukuni Shrine by Junichirō Koizumi, then Prime Minister of Japan.

== See also ==
- Ise Jingu
- Kogakkan University
- Shinto

== Bibliography ==
- 中山, 郁 (March 2009). "國學院大學と教派神道" [Kokugakuin University and Denominational Shinto]. 史料から見た神道-國學院大學の学術資産を中心に [Shinto from Historical Documents: Focusing on the Academic Assets of Kokugakuin University]. 弘文堂. pp. 227–247. ISBN 978-4335160561.
- 文化庁編さん (February 2011). 宗教年鑑 [Almanac of Religions] (PDF) (平成21年版 ed.). ぎょうせい. ISBN 978-4324091975. Archived from the original (PDF) on 2013-01-24.
