= Public-benefit nonprofit corporation =

Chartered by a US state government

A public-benefit nonprofit corporation is a type of nonprofit corporation chartered by a U.S. state government and organized primarily or exclusively for social, educational, recreational or charitable purposes by like-minded citizens. Public-benefit nonprofit corporations are distinct in the law from mutual-benefit nonprofit corporations in that they are organized for the general public benefit rather than for the interest of its members. They are also distinct in the law from religious corporations.

== See also ==
- Civic Voice
- Civic Trust (England)
- New York state public-benefit corporations
