= Shinto Directive =

Post-WWII order issued by Allied Occupation Authorities

Shinto Declaration

Supreme Commander of the Allied Powers
- Long title: Abolition of Governmental Sponsorship, Support, Perpetuation, Control, and Dissemination of State Shinto
- Enacted by: Supreme Commander of the Allied Powers
- Enacted: December 15, 1945

The Shinto Directive was an order issued in 1945 to the Japanese government by Occupation authorities to abolish state support for the Shinto religion. This unofficial "State Shinto" was thought by the Allies to have been a major contributor to Japan's nationalistic and militant culture that led to World War II. The purpose of the directive was ostensibly based in ideas of freedom of religion and separation of church and state.

== History ==
After the Second World War, it was generally understood by Allied students of Japanese culture and religion that Shinto in the form it took leading up to and during the war was social propaganda and was used as a tool of ultra-nationalism and a disguise for militarism. However, even though this support of Shinto was defined as non-religious propaganda, in the Allied schools it was being taught as religious in nature. Thus, it was US policy regarding post-surrender Japan to abolish "State Shinto," which was not and never had been a formal Imperial policy. The directive, SCAPIN 448, was drafted by the US military's expert on Japanese culture and religion, Lieutenant William K. Bunce, U.S.N.R. and was issued on December 15, 1945, with the full title of "Abolition of Governmental Sponsorship, Support, Perpetuation, Control, and Dissemination of State Shinto (Kokka Shinto, Jinja Shinto)". There were two translations given for the term "State Shinto": the first ("Kokka Shinto") was a neologism, and the second ("Jinja Shinto") referred to Shinto shrines, which up until 1945 had been secular wards of the state.

According to the directive, State Shinto was to be stripped of public support and of its "ultra-nationalistic and militaristic" trappings. With the severing of its traditional state patronage, the Shinto establishment required privatization, and to that end any Shinto entity that had been dependent on public funding but not actually part of the secular administrative structure was to be assimilated either into what the directive calls "Sect Shinto" with no special privileges above the other popular faiths, or to be reformed, with conditions stipulating complete and permanent loss of government support, as "Shrine Shinto," which was to be supported by voluntary private donation only.

No public funds whatsoever could therefore be used to support Shinto shrines or priests in any manner, nor any other entities that were at all associated with the Shinto religion. Public officials whose duties were in any way directly connected to Shinto religion were immediately to be terminated from office and their positions extinguished. Under the directive, Japan's Emperor could no longer report on public matters to his ancestors during official visits to the shrines. Instead, he was permitted to worship only non-officially and as a private individual, as all government officials were permitted to do.

Any educational material considered to convey "Shinto doctrine" was to be categorically censored out of school textbooks, along with any content that at all suggested any positive effects of or justification for any of Japan's military actions in past wars. Public officials alike were forbidden any mention of anything that could be construed as being in any way religious, let alone Shinto, while performing duties in their official capacities. This was meant to stop the propagation of supposed "militaristic and ultra-nationalistic ideology" in particular, which was especially proscribed if conveyed in connection with Shinto or any other creed.

These three alleged doctrines were specifically banned: (1) that the Emperor is superior to other rulers because he is descended from the sun goddess Amaterasu; (2) that the Japanese people are inherently superior to other peoples because of their special ancestry or heritage, or (3) that the Japanese islands are spiritually superior to other lands, because they are specially blessed by the Amaterasu.

As a result of the directive, a stream of instructions from the government was issued covering a wide range of prohibitions concerning Japanese culture and rites. Pupils at state schools and children of pre-school age were prohibited from being taken on field trips to religious institutions; local town committees were prohibited from fundraising for shrines; groundbreaking (jichinsai) and roof-raising rites (jōtōsai) were not to be performed for public buildings; state and public bodies were prohibited from conducting funerals and rites of propitiation for the war dead; and the removal and/or erection of commemorative sites for the war dead were regulated by the directive. However, the directive was lenient towards imperial court rites.

Initially, the directive was rigidly applied. This led to numerous complaints and grievances from local people. In 1949, halfway through the occupation, the directive came to be applied with greater discretion. Typical of this leniency was the approval granted to state funerals which entailed religious rites, such as those of Tsuneo Matsudaira of the Upper House (Shintō-style) and of Kijūrō Shidehara of the Lower House (Buddhist).

== Legacy ==
The Directive had a dramatic impact on postwar Japanese policy. Although it was only enforced by the GHQ, many of the changes it made became a part of a revised postwar legal interpretation of separation of religion and state. The only notable reversion, besides the Occupation-era approval of state funerals, was a 1965 Supreme Court decision approving of jichinsai (a ritual to purify the land before construction) and jōtōsai (a flag-raising ritual) for public buildings.

Shinto remains one of the most popular religions in Japan; and is tied to nationalism in Japan. Political parties like the Liberal Democratic Party (LDP) seek to reinstate Shinto as the state religion. The LDP has passed key initiatives to do so like restoring National Foundation Day and the Reign-Name Law. Former Prime Ministers Koizumi Junichiro and Nakasone Yasuhiro visited Yasukuni Shrine during their time as Prime Ministers. This upset Chinese and Korean officials who regarded these visits as the Japanese government neglecting its war responsibility. Prime Minister Nakasone discontinued his visits after these criticisms, but Prime Minister Koizumi continued his visits to Yasukuni Shrine. Prime Minister Koizumi stated that foreigners should not influence Japanese domestic affairs. In 2006, Prime Minister Abe Shinzo pushed the revision of the Fundamental Law of Education to promote patriotism in classrooms which was tied to Shintoism. Former Emperor Akihito stated that he preferred patriotism to not be coerced.

The reinstitution of Shinto as a state religion is a source of contention; a prime example is Yasukuni Shrine. Yasukuni has come under recent controversy because of its inclusion of Class-A war criminals. Yasukuni Shrine is a Shinto memorial to the war dead of Japan, this includes conscripted non-Japanese soldiers. The enshrinement of the war dead gave meaning to their deaths, creating a national consciousness of community in Japan. Yasukuni Shrine celebrates soldiers who died in Japan's wars since the Taiwan Expedition of 1874 and the end of the Pacific War in 1945. Shinto celebrates the dead soldiers as glorious spirits who died for the glory of Japan, this celebration continues today. Soldiers enshrined at Yasukuni are venerated for their sacrifice, which according to Yasukuni was their attempted liberation of Asia from Western imperialism. Yasukuni Shrine does not acknowledge Japan's involvement in the Pacific War as an act of aggression. Yasukuni Shrine is an important symbol of the Shinto religion and their stance has raised concerns among the affected nations of Japan's imperialism during the Pacific War. Shinto is seen as a Japanese essence, and the fight to maintain it at the forefront is claimed to be a protection of Japanese culture. The renationalization of Yasukuni Shrine remains an ongoing issue.

An event related to the Shinto Directive was the Humanity Declaration, an Imperial Rescript issued on January 1, 1946, in the name of Emperor Shōwa, claiming the Emperor was no god, but a person enjoying good relations with the public.
