= Bureau of Religions =

- Predecessor: Bureau of Shrines and Temples
- Formation: April 1900
- Dissolved: November 1, 1942
- Parent organization: Home Ministry (1900-1913), Ministry of Education, Science, Sports and Culture (1913-1942)

The Bureau of Religions (宗教局, Shūkyō kyoku) is one of the Internal departments of the Ministry of the Interior during the pre-World War I period and later the Ministry of Education, Science, Sports and Culture in Japan.

It was split off from the Bureau of Shrines and Temples in 1900.

== Outline ==
Initially, religious administration was under the jurisdiction of the Bureau of Shrines and Temples of the Ministry of the Interior, but in April 1900, it was separated into the Bureau of Shrines and the Bureau of Religion. The first and second divisions were set up with jurisdictions over Shinto, Buddhist, and other religious affairs, as well as monks' and teachers' affairs.

On June 13, 1913, the Bureau of Religion was transferred from the jurisdiction of the Home Ministry to the Ministry of Education, Science, Sports and Culture. It was in charge of denominations, sects, associations, priests, teachers, and other matters related to religion, such as Buddhist temples and the preservation of old shrines and temples.

On December 22, 1924, the First Section was renamed the Religious Affairs Section and the Second Section was renamed the Ancient Shrine and Temple Preservation Section. On December 1, 1928, the Division for the Preservation of Ancient Temples and Shrines was renamed the Preservation Division. In 1942 it was abolished and went through a few successor institutions until complete abolition after the end of World War II.

== Bibliography ==
- 秦郁彦 (1981), 戦前期日本官僚制の制度・組織・人事, 東京大学出版会
- 秦郁彦 (2001), 日本官僚制総合事典 : 1868-2000, 東京大学出版会, ISBN 4130301217
