= Religious corporation =

Sociocultural organization recognized by law as a single entity

A religious corporation is a type of religious non-profit organization, which has been incorporated under the law. Often these types of corporations are recognized under the law on a subnational level, for instance by a state or province government. The government agency responsible for regulating such corporations is usually the official holder of records, for instance, the Secretary of State. In the United States, religious corporations are formed like all other nonprofit corporations by filing articles of incorporation with the state. Religious corporation articles need to have the standard tax-exempt language the IRS requires. Religious corporations are permitted to designate a person to act in the capacity of corporation sole. This is a person who acts as the official holder of the title on the property, etc.

There are four different forms of religious corporations with regard to their laws and the way they function within government. The four classes are "the aggregate corporation, the trustee corporation, the modern form of the corporation sole, and the Roman Catholic Church".

== United States ==
In the United States, religious corporations are subject to less rigorous state and federal filing and reporting requirements than other tax-exempt organizations, such as mutual benefit nonprofit corporations, or public benefit nonprofit corporations. Depending on the state in which they are located, they may also be exempt from some of the inspections or regulations governing non-religious groups performing the same services. The laws of the different states disclose the fact that, notwithstanding the diversity of statutory provisions concerning charitable and religious corporations, there is such a degree of uniformity as to suggest the corporations in different states have diverse statutory provisions.

=== Roman Catholic Church ===
The Roman Catholic Church is recognized as a corporation by virtue of the treaty of 1898 in Spain, while other religious corporations derive their status from their charters granted to them by the state. All religious, private, and civil corporations are created for the purpose of conducting the temporal affairs of their affiliated church. The church by the nature of its organization may be entirely independent of other clerical associations; or maybe a subordinate part of some general corporation or denomination in which there are superior ministerial tribunals, with the general and ultimate power of judicature over the whole membership of the general organization.

Accordingly, the General Conference of 1872, in pursuance of a resolution offered, after consultation, and subsequently approved by the Committee on Church Extension, bishops were directed "to appoint, in each State and Territory, and in the District of Columbia, one person learned in the law, whose duty it shall be to furnish gratuitously to the Board of Church Extension a form of a deed, forms of mortgages and bequests, and forms for legal incorporation of churches, with written suggestions in relation thereto as may be deemed desirable."

=== Taxation ===
Each state has its own laws regarding charitable organizations, specifically those of a religious manner. Each state has general guidelines they must follow in order to declare these corporations' ability to be exempt from taxes, and function as a corporation does.

Federal tax laws outline the considerations of religious organizations and corporations and disclose tax information to be considered for tax exemption. The organization must not be organized or operated for the benefit of private interests, and no part of a section 501 organization's net earnings may inure to the benefit of any private shareholder or individual. If the organization engages in an excess benefit transaction with a person having substantial influence over the organization, an excise tax may be imposed on the person and any organization managers agreeing to the transaction.

Churches and associated corporations are automatically considered tax-exempt and are not required to apply for and obtain recognition of exempt status from the IRS. Donors are allowed to claim a charitable deduction for donations to a church that meets the section 501(c)(3) requirements, even though the church has neither sought nor received IRS recognition that it is tax-exempt. In addition, because churches and certain other religious organizations are not required to file an annual return or notice with the IRS, they are not subject to automatic revocation of exemption for failure to file.

== See also ==
- Public-benefit nonprofit corporation
- Church and State (disambiguation)
