= Kōten Kōkyūsho =

Shinto priest training organization

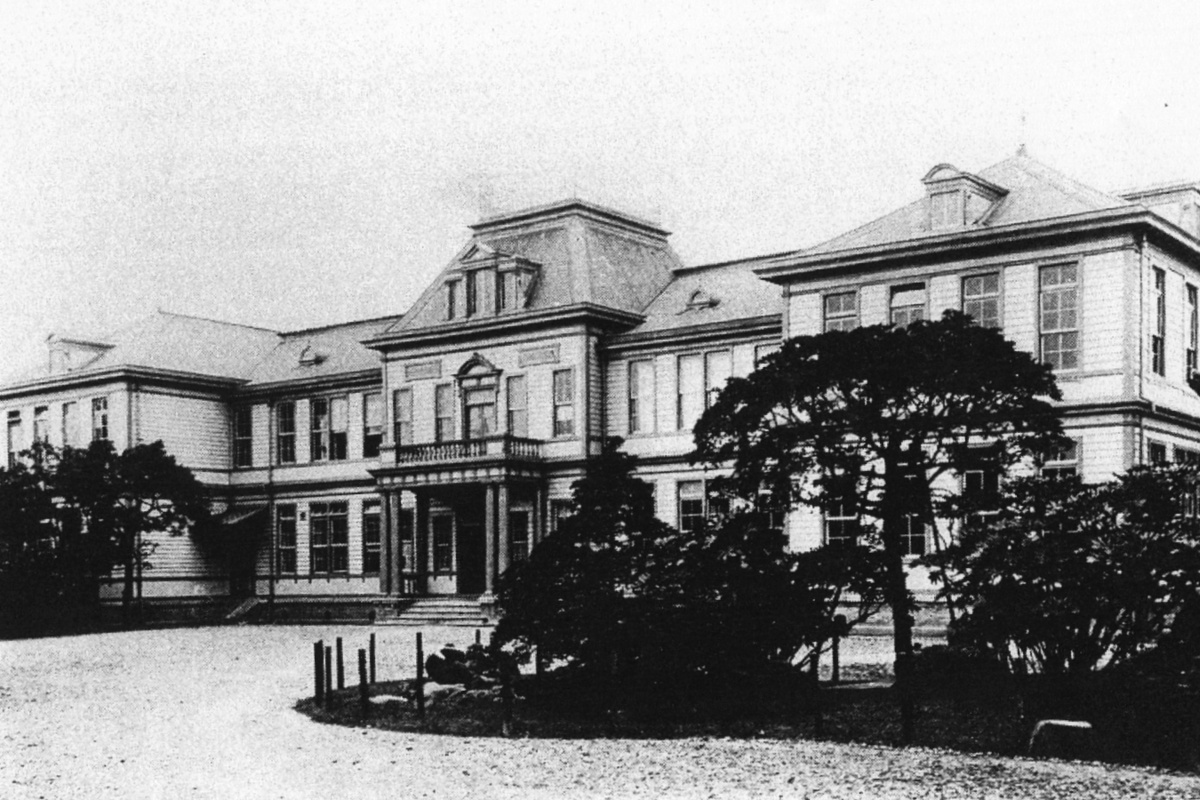
- Office of Japanese Classics Research at the end of the Meiji era
- Predecessor: Bureau of Shinto Affairs
- Successor: Association of Shinto Shrines, Kokugakuin University

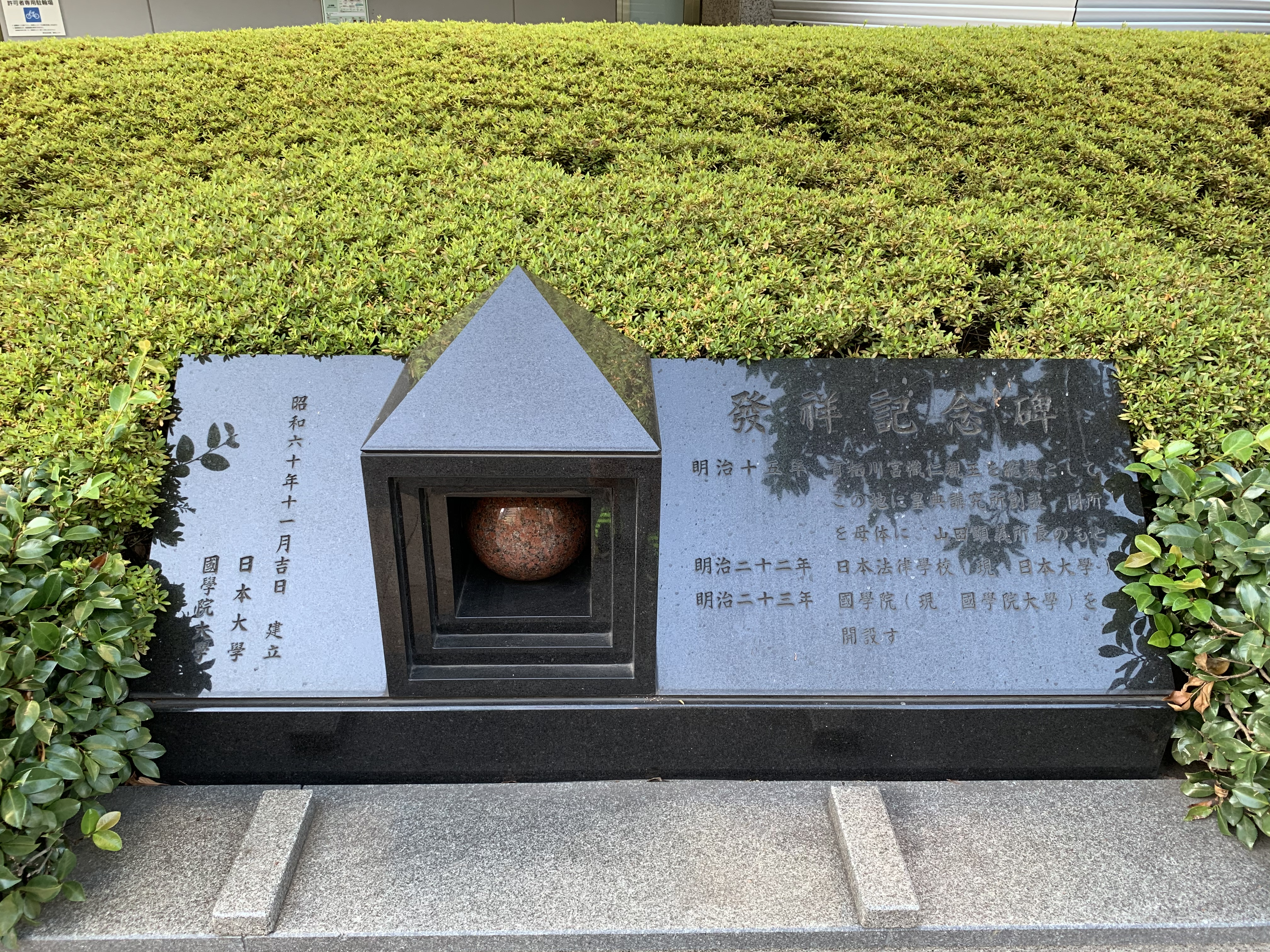
This monument is located in front of the Tokyo Kusei Kaikan in Iidabashi, Chiyoda-ku, Tokyo. Tokyo Kusei Kaikan was the former location of the Office of Japanese Classics Research.

The Institute of Japanese Classics Research (皇典講究所, Kōten Kōkyūsho) was a central government organization for the training of the Shinto priesthood in Japan. It was established by the Meiji Government in 1882 as the successor organization to the Bureau of Shinto Affairs. Prince Arisugawa Takahito was its first head.

Under pressure from the Occupation Policy by the postwar GHQ, it was dissolved in 1946. The Association of Shinto Shrines was established and merged the National Association of Shinto Priests, Jingu-kyo, and Institute of Divinities into the same organization. Kokugakuin University Foundation (the predecessor of Kokugakuin University) was then established as a stand-alone corporation.

== Overview ==
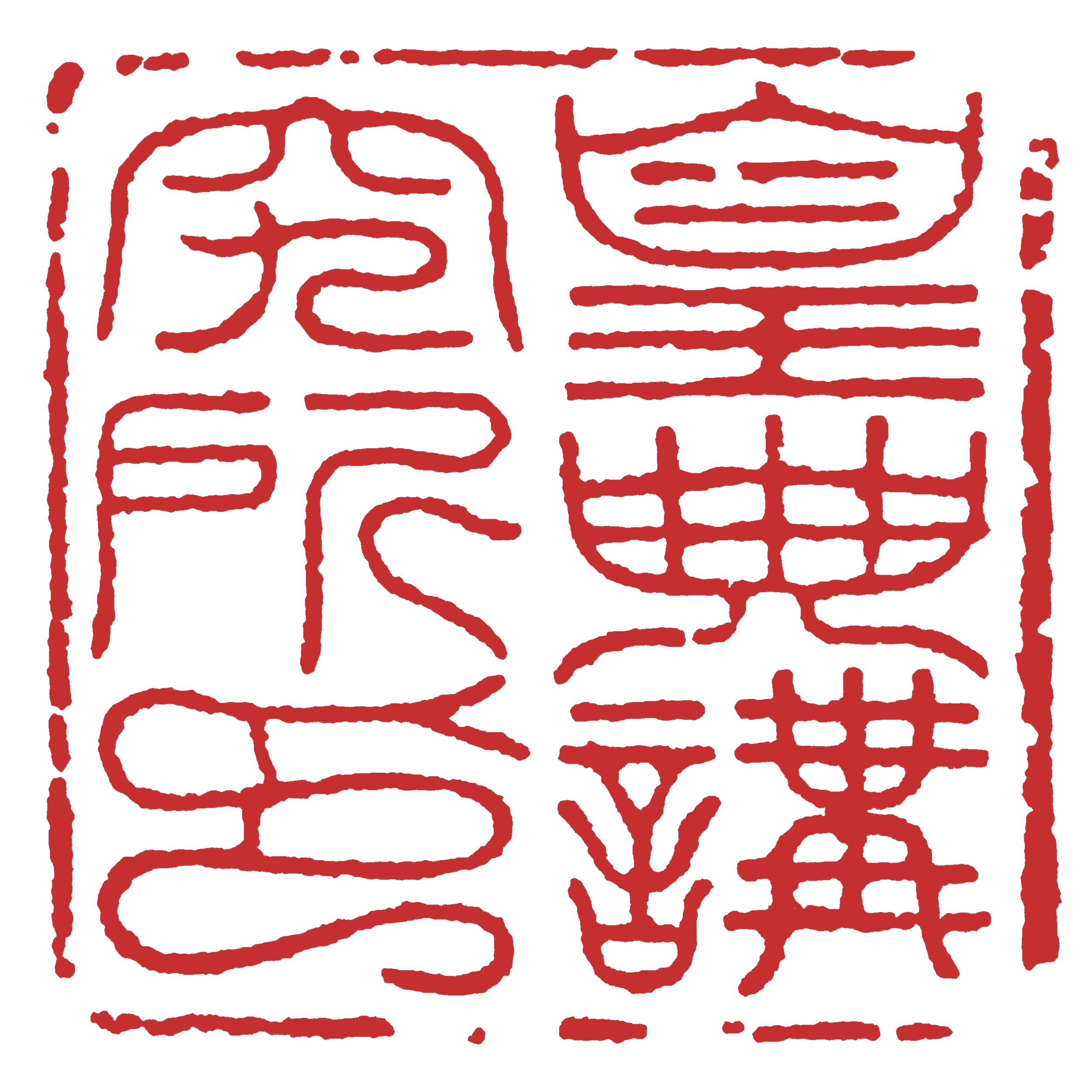
Imprint of the Office of Japanese Classics Research

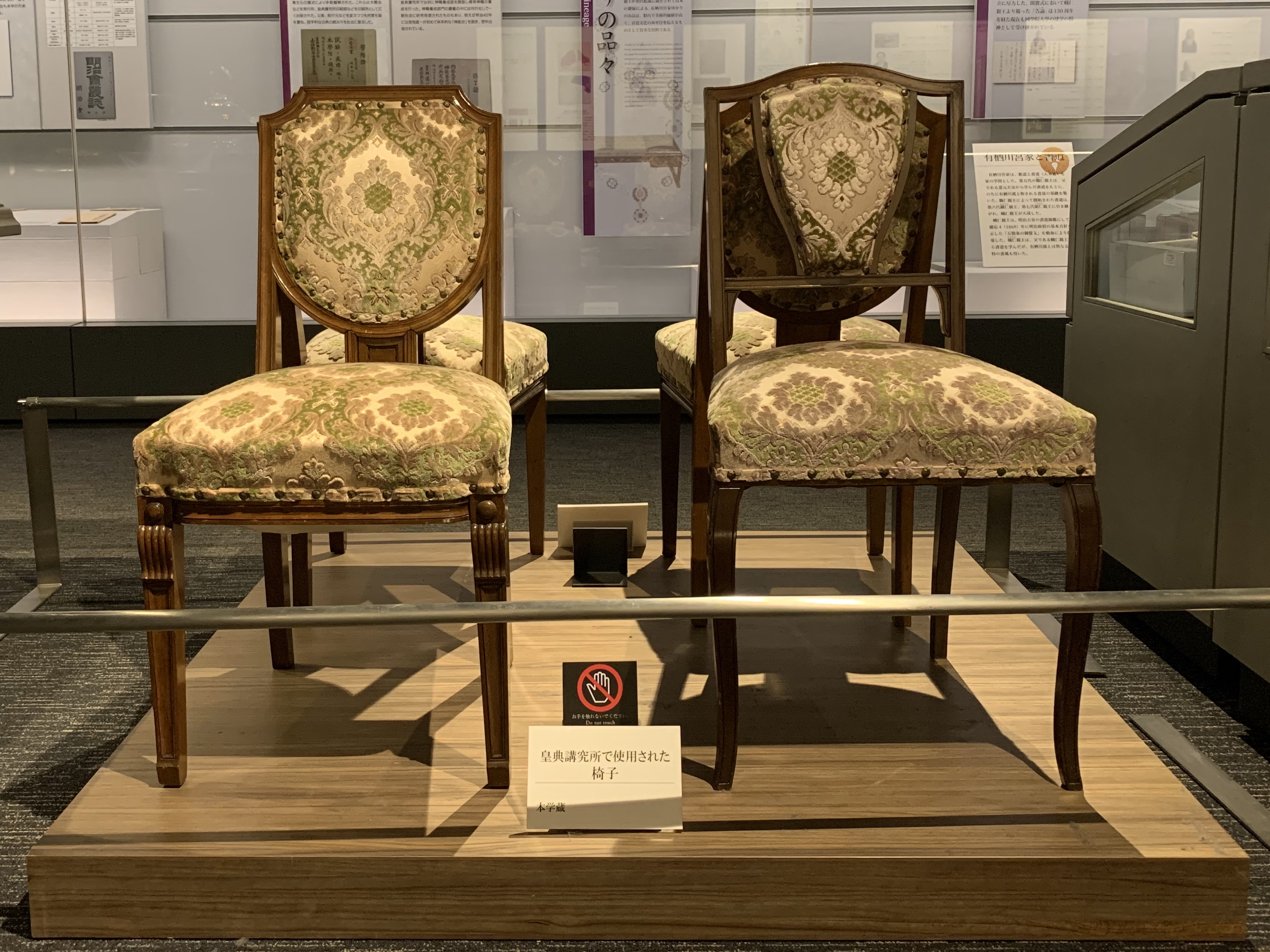
Chairs used in the Imperial Lecture Hall in Kokugakuin University Museum

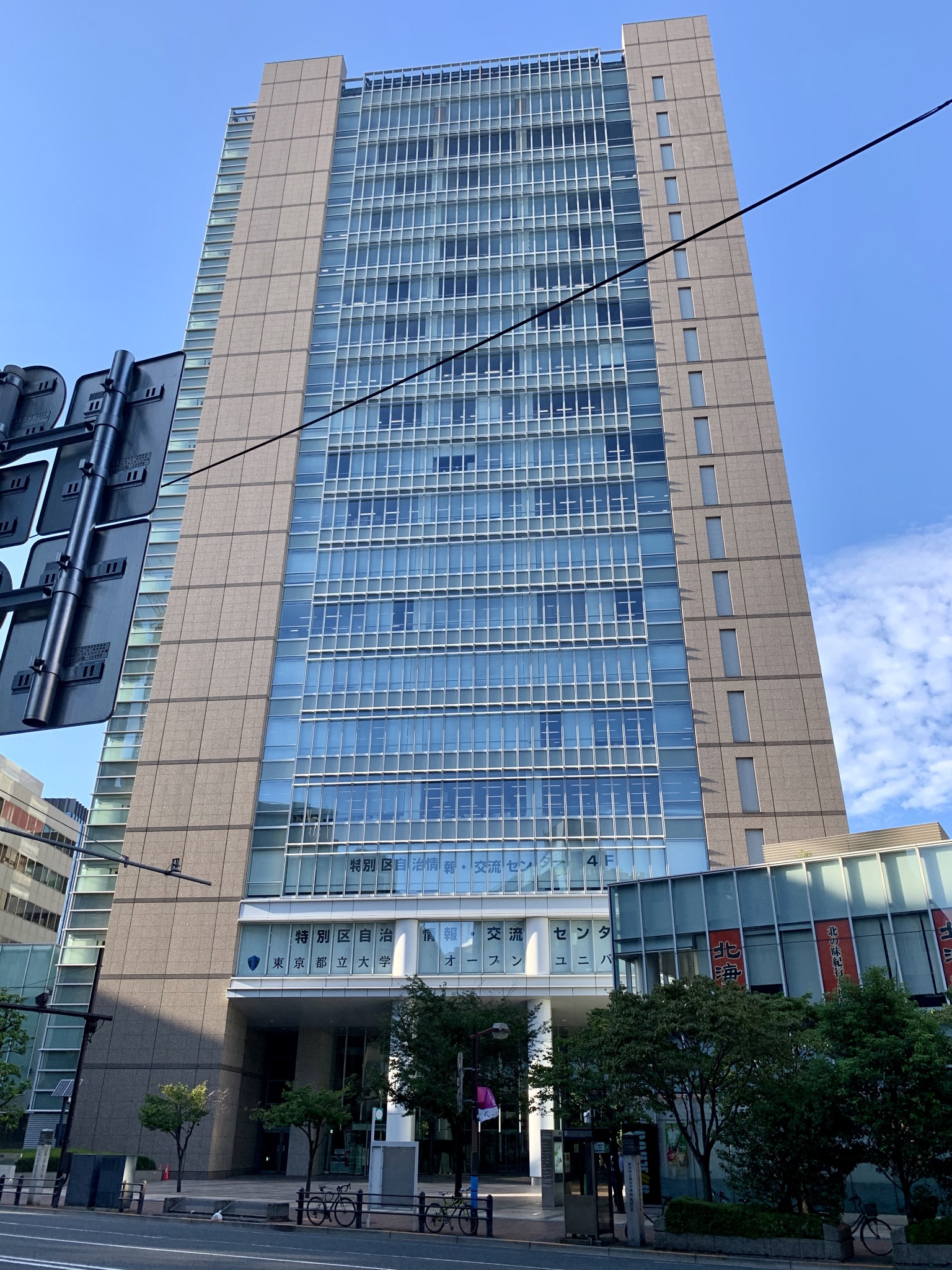
Tokyo Ward Government Building at the former location of the Imperial Palace Kosho

This school was opened as an institution to carry out the indoctrination of the Imperial Way to the masses as part of the religious policy of the Meiji era, when State Shinto was established. In 1890, the organization expanded the educational business and opened Kokugakuin.

After its establishment, as part of its business, it began publishing the Imperial Lectures from 1889 (1889) February. In 1890 (Meiji 23), a compilation project of Koji Ruien was carried out. The Engishiki was also compiled, and in 1931 (Showa 6), a revised Engishiki was published to commemorate the 1,000th anniversary of the Engishiki compilation. The Ministry of Home Affairs was commissioned to train priests and priesthoods, and the Imperial Institute and Kokugakuin University Press published many reference books for the priesthood qualification examination.

With the establishment of the Kyodo Shoku, the priesthood was abolished as a teaching ministry, and the main duties of the priesthood were limited to rituals. Shinto priests who wanted to preach doctrine were marginalised into Sect Shinto. The state continued to treat Shinto as a non-religious institution due to Secular Shrine Theory, while the priesthood continued to perform official state rituals. When the foundation eventually developed into an incorporated foundation and the appearance of Shinto as the state religion came to an end and management became difficult, it was jointly run by private organizations related to shrine with the cooperation of Shintoists, along with the Dainippon Jingikai (大日本神祇会) and Jingū Hōsaikai (神宮奉斎会), until then.

== History ==
Around the 10th year of Meiji (1877), during the Bunmei-kaika era, the slump of the Proclamation of the Great Doctrine and the subsequent controversy over the ritual gods led to a proposal from within the government to establish a school focusing on Kokugaku research, and the subsequent controversy over the establishment of a school for Kokugaku studies. In the 15th year of Meiji (1882) August 23, Emperor Meiji appointed Prince Nobuhito Arisugawa, his most trusted advisor, as the president. In the same year, Yamada Akiyoshi and other Ministry of the Interior High official, and several Japanese literature scholars, including Iidacho, on November 4 of the same year.

The Imperial Academy was established with two divisions: the Faculty of Letters, which consisted of the four departments of shumon, history, law, and writing, and the Faculty of Work, which consisted of the three departments of etiquette, music, and gymnastics. According to the "Establishment Announcement" issued at the opening of the school, the philosophy and purpose of the Faculty of Literature was to "teach the national scriptures", "cultivate morality", "cultivate talent through Chinese and Western studies", "cultivate men of national utility", and "promote the beauty of the nation abroad.

In 1888 (Meiji 21), six years after the opening of the school, the regulations were revised. According to the prospectus for the revision, the institute was to be an institution for the training of students specializing in Japanese literature, and it was to convene experts in Japanese literature to study every detail of Japanese literature that should be documented in the present day. The three departments were Political Science, Legislation, and Literature, with the Literature Department offering courses in language, writing, customs, natural products, crafts, fine arts, agriculture, and geography.

Later, in 1890 (Meiji 23), the Kokugakuin, which taught national history, national literature, and national law, was opened at the Imperial Academy, and the place dedicated to national law was named the Japan Law School (which developed into Nihon University).

On January 25, 1946 (Showa 21), after the end of World War II, the GHQ dissolved the Imperial Academy and Kokugakuin University was established. The Nihon Law School initially held lectures at night in classrooms rented from the Imperial Law School. Nihon University, because of its close relationship with the Imperial Academy, began offering Shinto courses in 1924 for the purpose of re-educating Shinto teachers, and the Shinto Scholarship Association was organized by the Shinto Sect United Association (later Sect Shinto Federation). The Shinto Scholarship Society was organized.

=== Chronology ===
==== From inception to dissolution ====
- 1882 (Meiji15) - Established as the successor organization to the Bureau of Shinto Affairs. The dual role of Shinto priests as instructors was abolished. Gendo Yano is appointed as the first Dean of the Faculty of Letters, and Prince Nobuhito Arisugawa is appointed as the first President. The school is located in Tokyo Prefecture, Iidacho, Kojimachi-ku (now Chiyoda-kuIidabashi), and the Imperial Academy is established.
- 1884 (Meiji 17) - Movement to transfer the Imperial Academy to a government-run institution (-18th year of Meiji) aborted due to the death of Prince Noborito in 1904.
- 1887 (Meiji 20) - The first graduation ceremony of the Imperial Academy. The alumni association "Suihokai" was established. (This is regarded as the founding of Kokugakuin Daigakuin Inyu-kai).
- 1888 (Meiji 21) - Furitsu Ichi Junior High School principal Yoshito Maruyama, Isao Matsuno, Sunao Motoda, Sadasuke Imaizumi, and others establish a supplementary junior high school at the Imperial Academy. Later reorganized as Kyoritsu Junior High School, a private school.
- 1889 (1889) - Yamada Akiyoshi becomes the first director of the Imperial Academy. The Japan Law School is established within the Imperial Academy. (Predecessor of Nihon University Law School).
- 1890 (23rd year of Meiji) - Kokugakuin established as an educational institution within the Imperial Academy.
- 1893 (1893) - The Japan Law School becomes a designated school of the Ministry of Justice, and its graduates are qualified to take the examination for appointment as judges and prosecutors.
- 1894 (27th year of Meiji) - Kyoritsu Junior High School was renamed Johoku Junior High School and transferred to Tokyo Prefecture. (The predecessor of Toyama High School, Johoku Junior High School, Johoku High School, etc.)
- 1895 (28th year of Meiji) - Japan Law School moved to Dainippon Kyoiku Kai (located in Hitotsubashi Street, Kanda-ku).
- 1896 (29th year of Meiji) - Japan Law School reorganized as an incorporated foundation and became organizationally independent from the Imperial Academy.
- 1898 (31st year of Meiji) - The Imperial Academy is approved as an incorporated foundation.
- 1899 (32nd year of Meiji) - Ministry of the Interior entrusted with the training of priests.
- 1900 (33rd year of Meiji) - Establishment of the Reiten Investigation Committee.
- 1909 (1909) - The Priesthood Training Department was established.
- 1923 (1923) - Moved to the Imperial estate behind Shibuya Hikawa.
- 1930 (1930|1930) - The shrine was reopened.
- 1944 (Showa 19) - The Kokugaku Kenkyusho (Kokugaku Research Institute) was established.
- 1946 (1946) - In response to pressure from the General Headquarters of the Allied Forces occupation, the institute was dissolved in January. The following month, the Religious corporation Shrine Headquarters was established. It was merged together with the Dai Nihon Kagimikai and the Jingu Bonsai Kai, and in March, Kokugakuin University Foundation (the predecessor of Kokugakuin University Educational Corporation) was established as a stand-alone corporation.

==== After dissolution ====
- 1955 (1955) - The Institute of Japanese Studies at Kokugakuin University was established and took over the research of the Imperial Academy.
- 1985 (1985) - Nihon University and Kokugakuin University jointly erected a monument at the site of the Imperial Academy (3-5-5 Chiyoda-ku Iidabashiin front of the Tokyo Kusei Kaikan).
- 2007 (Heisei 19) - Kokugakuin University Educational Corporation registered the Imperial Academy as a trademark. Registration No. 5018534.

== Basic Data ==
- Location: 5-8 Iidacho, Kojimachi-ku, Tokyo (current Tokyo Chiyoda-ku Iidabashi)
- Area: 1,666 tsubo (1,666 m2), 1 kyu 9 shaku (1,666 tsubo, 1 kyu 9 shaku)
- Capacity: 300 students

=== Course of study (at the time of establishment) ===
- Main course: 3 years, Preliminary course: 2 years
  - Faculty of Literature (4 departments: Shushoku, History, Laws and Regulations, and Writing)
  - Work Department: 2 departments (3 departments of etiquette, music, and gymnastics)

== Remarks ==
Notice

On November 4, 1882, the school announced its intention to become a modern nation's academic school (Gakko, synonymous with "school" and read the same as "school"). On November 4, 1882, the government announced its intention to establish a modern national school (gakko, which is synonymous with "school" and reads the same way) for the study of Japan's original studies.

The Imperial Household Law Institution is built.

We have selected Yoshitatsu to conduct the opening ceremony of the school today. The General Judge Noboru Hitoshi, who has been entrusted with the responsibility of presiding over the ceremony, addresses the staff and students in a friendly manner. The path of learning is far greater than the path of books. The teaching of the national form will strengthen the foundation of our nation and cultivate our moral character. and cultivate moral values in order to aim for the true purpose of life. This is a rule that should not be forgotten by the next generation. This is why we must establish this school Now after the staff student, this is the body of the body Takamasa Honjou Eternal Second Period Seyo

November 4, 1897

Prince Arisugawa Takahito

Date of Establishment

The establishment of the school was officially approved on August 23, 1882, and the opening ceremony was scheduled to take place on September 1, but was postponed due to the health condition of the president, Prince Nobuhito Arisugawa, and the school was opened on November 4. Classes were held from September.

On June 3, the school site was set at the residence of former Hatamoto Hayato Akimoto, 5-8 Iidacho, Kojimachi-ku, Tokyo, and on August 21, an "Application for the Establishment of an Imperial Institute for the Study of the Imperial Law" was sent in the name of Vice President of the Shinto School Hei Iwashitara Yamada Akiyoshi, the Vice President of Shintoism, and was approved on the 23rd of the same month. The date of registration of the Foundation (nonprofit) was later changed to the date of its establishment.

== Public and private schools ==
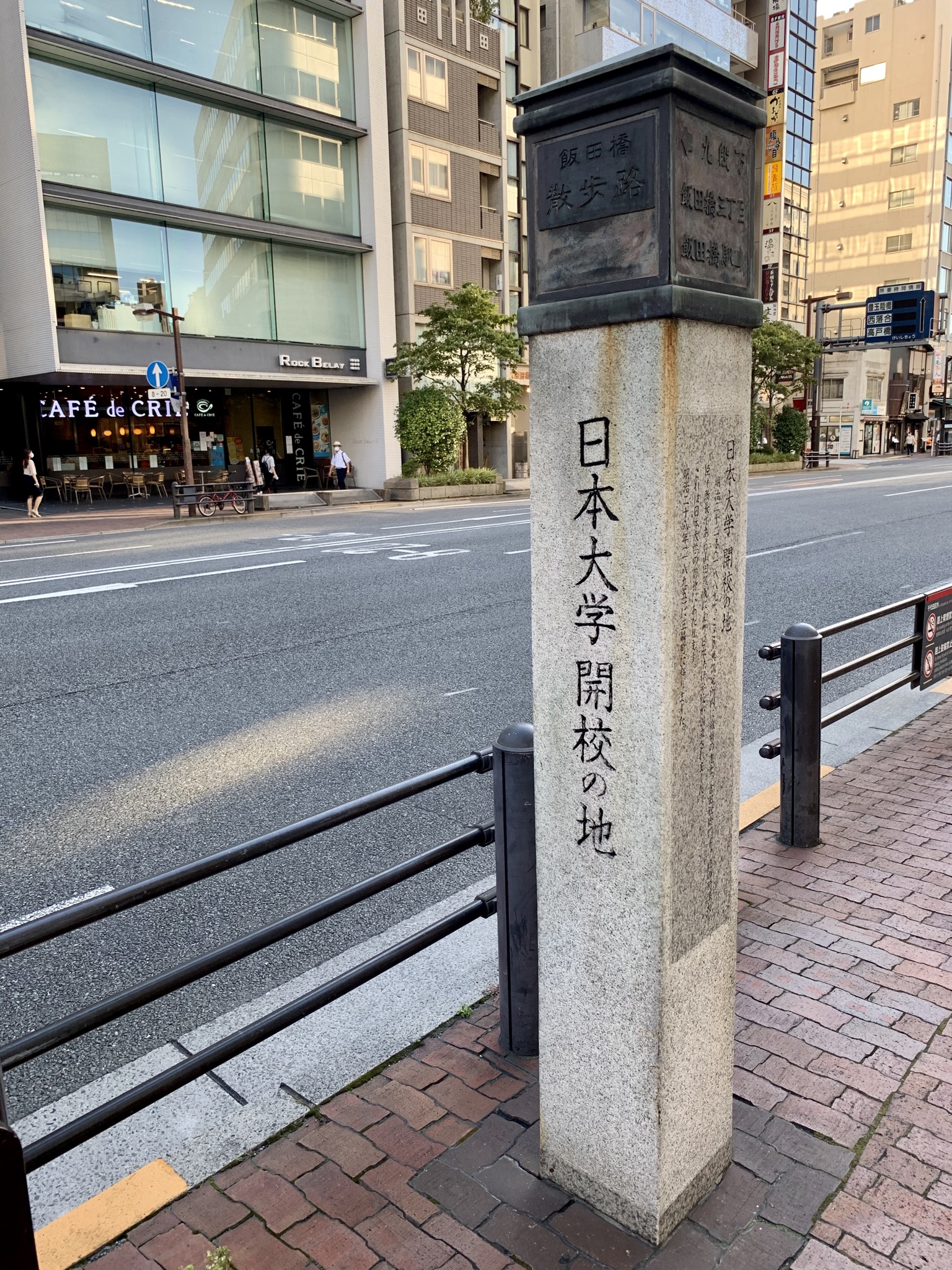
Nihon University, the site of the school's founding.

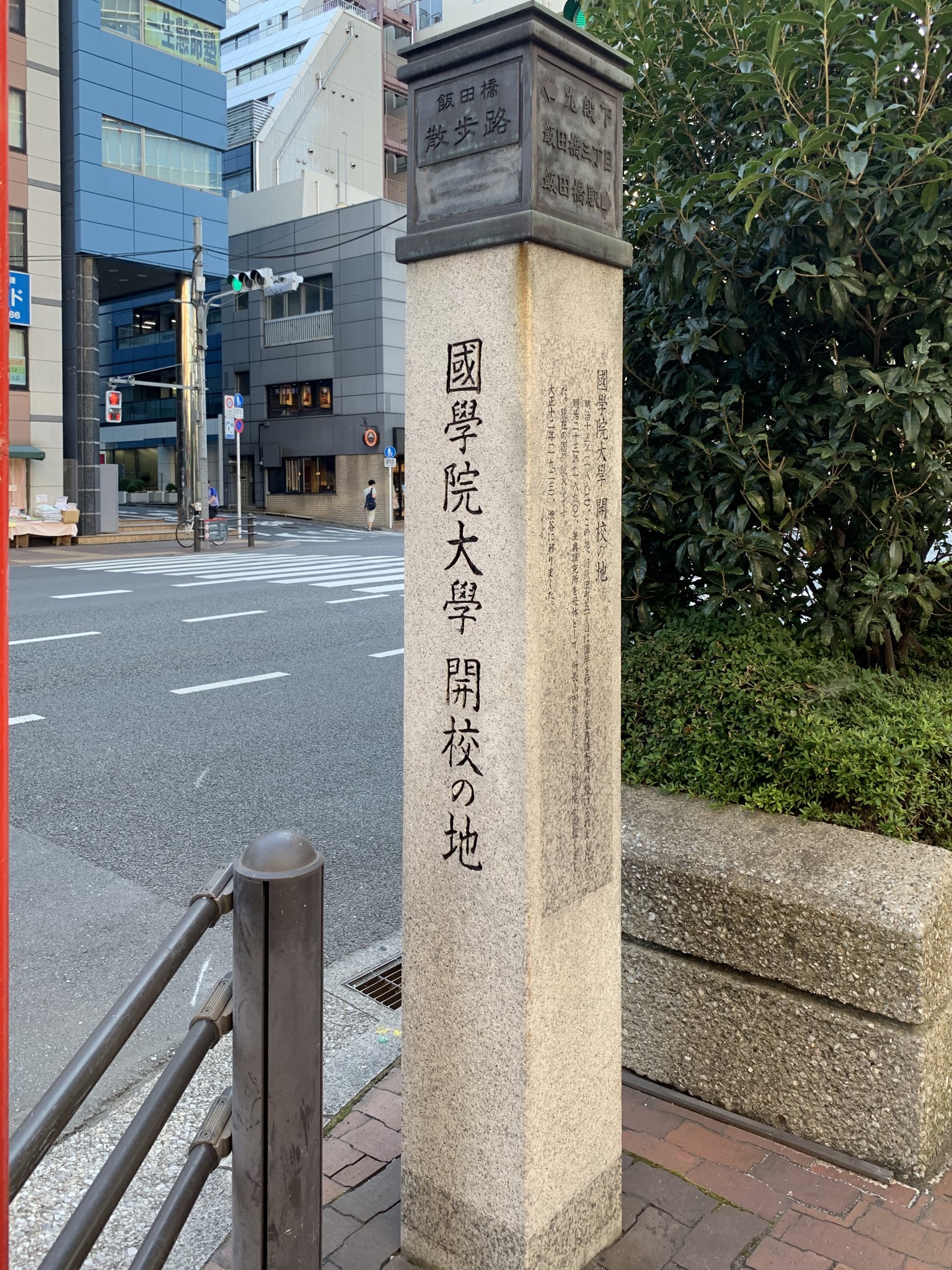
Kokugakuin University Opening Place

The Imperial Academy established an institution for research on its premises. The director, Akiyoshi Yamada Minister of Justice, founded the Japan Law School in 1889 (Meiji 22), followed by the Kokugakuin in the following year. He subsequently fostered public and private law schools.

Law School

In 1889, the Minister of Justice, Yamada Kengi, who was the director of the Imperial Academy, established an educational institution within the Imperial Academy for the purpose of researching Japan's unique Code of law using ancient Japanese and foreign laws as a means of improving Japan's legal system.

Kokugakuin

Following the Law School, the Kokugakuin was established in 1890 to study national history, national literature, and national law, and to promote national studies and to train priests as an institution for teaching the concept of the nation, or national direction and Shinto.

== Positions held ==
For Kokugakuin University, see Kokugakuin University#People and organizations related to Kokugakuin

=== President ===
- Prince Nobuhito Arisugawa, February 1882 - January 1886.
- Prince Tsunehisa Takeda, May 1908-.
- Prince Naruhisa Kitashirakawa 1908-1924
- Kunihiko Kuniyoshi, November 1927 - 1930
- Prince Prince Kaniinomiya, 1930 - 1945
- Prince Morimasa Nashimoto 1945-1946

=== Vice President ===
- Kuga Tatemichi, September 1882-]
- Takayuki Sasaki
- Naohiro Nabeshima April 1918-June 1921
- Egi Senyuki August 1932-.
- Hiranuma Kiichirō, 1945-

=== Director ===
- Yamada Akiyoshi January 1889 - 1895
- Takayuki Sasaki June 1896 - March 1910
- Yoshikawa Akimasa March 1910-March 1911
- Naohiro Nabeshima March 1911-April 1918
- Hisamoto Hijikata, 1919-
- Eitaro Komatsubara, 1919-1920
- Kitokurō Ichiki 1920-1925
- Kuniyuki Tokugawa, February 1925-August 1932
- Kuniyuki Tokugawa, 1933-
- Yukitada Sasaki May 1936-March 1946

=== Secretary General ===
- Shigetake Sugiura May 1899-
- Shinichiro Yamada 1912 - 1917
- Yoshiki Kuwabara 1917-

=== Secretary ===
- Noboru Takayama 1902- * Momoki Kamo 1903
- Momoki Kamo April 1903-October 1905
- Iwakichi Ishikawa 1909- * Yoshiki Kuwahara 1917
- Yoshiki Kuwabara 1917-
- Tomokazu Soejima 1926 (Taisho 15)-

=== Executive Director ===
- Yoshiki Kuwabara 1918-
- Yoshiki Iwamoto 1924-
- Tomokazu Soejima 1933-

=== Executive Director ===
- Yoshiki Kuwabara
- Tomokazu Soejima 1933-
- Noboru Takayama 1937-
- Shigeru Yoshida

=== Board of directors ===
- Sadasuke Imaizumi

Toyoji Wada 1921- * Shozo Kono 1935- * Shozo Kono 1935- * Shigeru Yoshida (bureaucrat)

- Shozo Kono 1935-
- Naoichiro Ueki 1945-

== Others ==
As a reorganization of the former Ministry of the Interior due to the separation of teachings and studies, the Imperial Academy was decided upon by a motion made after the conclusion of the Grand Council on Shintoism by Home Minister Yamada Kenyoshi, who was appointed to the Shinto Interdisciplinary Office at the time. (Note: The Imperial Academy, which was based on the Shinto Office Student Dormitory and expanded, was established from Yamada's It was established from a motion of the Kensho) In 1885 Cabinet System was established, and in 1886 Itō Hirobumi established a government official training institute. 1889 The Constitution of the Empire of Japan was enacted, which shifted the focus from imperial studies to government-oriented Higher education system. The priesthood training institutions were transformed into official training institutions under Ito's policy of establishing the Imperial University Ordinance. Thus, the establishment of public interest corporation under Act No. 89 of 1894 came into effect, and the new Civil law of 1898 transformed the organization into a foundation (public interest corporation), which was the modern organization at the time. (Note: In the same year, the Japan Law School also made the same transition.)

== Bibliography ==
- 『皇典講究所五十年史』、皇典講究所、国会図書館デジタル化資料、1932年
- 『皇典講究所改正要領』、皇典講究所、国会図書館デジタル化資料、1889年6月
- 『皇典講究所草創期の人々』、國學院大學、本居豊穎、1982年2月
- 『明治期國學研究雑誌集成』、國學院大學、木野主計、雄松堂出版、1996年11月
- 新田均・武田秀章 (2005). "第六章 明治維新以後（近代）、現代". In 神社本庁研修所 (ed.). わかりやすい神道の歴史 [An Easy-to-Understand History of Shinto.] (in Japanese). 神社新報社. ISBN 9784915265051.
- 松本久史; 阪本是丸（編）; 石井研士（編）; 武田秀章・笹生衛・岡田荘司・西岡和彦・中西正幸・茂木栄・茂木貞純・星野光樹・黒﨑浩行・藤本頼生 (2011). プレステップ神道学. 弘文堂. pp. 74–87. ISBN 9784335000799.
- ブリタニカ国際大百科事典 小項目事典, ed. (2014). 皇典講究所. Britannica Japan.
- 世界宗教用語大事典, ed. (2004). 皇典講究所. 中経出版. ISBN 978-4404031389.
- 松村明（監修） (2004). デジタル大辞泉 (ed.). 皇典講究所. 小学館.

== See also ==
- Shinto
  - Kannushi
- Association of Shinto Shrines
