= Jingūkyō =

Shinto Sect

- Predecessor: Ise Grand Shrine local administration
- Successor: Association of Shinto Shrines
- Parent organization: Institute of Divinities (1940–1946)

Jingūkyō (神宮教) is a sect of Shinto that originated from Ise Grand Shrine, the Ise faith. It was not technically a Sect Shinto group but had characteristics of one. It was founded in 1882, and was reorganized into the Jingū Service Foundation (神宮奉斎会, Jingu-hosai-kai) in 1899.

== Overview ==
Jingukyo was established during the Meiji era in Japan. While it was not included as one of the thirteen sects of prewar Shinto, it possessed characteristics of sect Shinto until the mid-Meiji period. It was organized by Urata Nagatami and others, with Tanaka Yoritsune as its first Superintendent.

In 1872, Urata Nagatami asked for permission to start a Shinto church called Jingū Kyōkai, shortly after the Ministry of Religion was created. He opened teaching centers and religious groups to organize his disciples, then combined them under the name Divine Wind Religious Association in 1873. Popular pilgrimage groups that were already established were also included. The Jingūkyō Institute started spreading its teachings throughout the country after the dissolution of the Daikyōin in 1875.

In 1882, the Kyodo Shoku was abolished, which led to the Jingūkyo Institute declaring itself independent from the official Grand Shrine Administration Office and renaming itself Jingūkyō. Tanaka Yoritsune became the first superintendent after Urata resigned. Membership increased until the late 1880s, but there was little growth afterward. In 1898, Japan's Civil Law was passed, and there was a movement to make the Jingūkyō a service organization for the Grand Shrines of Ise. As a result, the Jingūkyō was reorganized into the Jingū Hōsaikai in September 1899.

== The missionary body of the Ise faith ==
On July 20, 1872 (Meiji 5), he was appointed Chotami Urada, a minor chief priest of Ise Grand Shrine and also a member of Ministry of Education requested the establishment of the Jingu Church (神宮教会, Jingū kyōkai), and in October, he submitted a notification for the Jingu-kyoin (神宮教院, Jingūkyō-in) for teaching and learning, established a kosha for the followers, and established the existing Ise-kō (Taijōkō) as the foundation of the Jingu Church. The Jingu-kyoin was reorganized under the umbrella of the Jingu Church based on the existing Ise-ko (Taiji-ko). The Jingu-kyoin was established as the center of the Jingu Church. In 1873 (the 6th year of Meiji), based on a donation of 2,000 ryo by Matsudaira Munehide, Guji of Ise Jingu, a preaching hall was established to serve as a model for shrines throughout Japan, and in August it was named Jiyoukan, which meant "Shrine within Meiji Jingu The church was meant to be a church, the notification was made in March, and the building opened on October 1. The local koshas called themselves patriotic koshas, etc., but in October of 1873 (1873) they were unified and became Kamikaze Koshas.

From July to December of 1873, the Jingu Church's pilgrimage was planned by Urata and preached by Honjo and other ministers, and attracted an audience of 9,000 or more people on most days, and several hundred to 2,000 on others.

After the dissolution of the Great Teaching Institute, in accordance with Urada's teaching policy, a branch office was established in Tokyo, and each diocese in Japan had one headquarters church and branch churches.

== Independence as a denominational Shinto sect ==
In 1882, the Ministry of Home Affairs issued the "Ministry of Home Affairs Announcement No. B No. 7 of January 24, 1882," abolishing the dual role of the priest who presided over rituals and the Kyodo Shoku who conducted proselytizing. Shortly after this, the Ise Grand Shrine and the Jingu-kyoin were separated, and the Jingu-kyoin became a branch of the Sect Shinto called the Shinto Jingu-ha. After Urata retired in 1877 (10th year of Meiji), Yoritsune Tanaka, who had worked on the teaching, became the first head minister. On October 5, the various schools of the Sect Shinto were independent under the name of the school, but were not branches each with the name of the denomination as not being.

In 1882 (Meiji 15), it was agreed that the production and distribution of the Jingu Taima would be entrusted to the Jingūkyō administration, but the following year it was changed so that the Jingu Office was responsible for production and the Jingūkyō administration was responsible for distribution.

== Tokyo Daijingu ==
In 1882 (Meiji 15), in Hibiya, Tokyo, the Jingūkyō administration built the Tokyo Daijingu, then called Hibiya Daijingu.

After the Kanto Earthquake, the shrine was moved to Iidabashi in 1928 and renamed to Iidabashi Daijingu. After World War II, the place changed its name to Tokyo Daijingu.

== Development and reorganization to the Association of Shinto Shrines through the Jingu-hosai-kai ==
On September 24, 1899, the organization was reorganized as the Jingu-hosai-kai Foundation, an organization of reverends, due to the narrowing of the scope of its activities with the establishment of national Shinto and criticism of leaving the distribution of Jingu Taima, a national project, to one religious sect. In accordance with the Shinto Directive of January 23, 1946, the National Association of Shinto Priests, the Office of Japanese Classics Research, and Jingūkyō took the lead to establish the Association of Shinto Shrines.

== Present ==
There is currently a religious organization of the same name in Hyōgo Prefecture Tamba Sasayama City. It is not a direct successor to the prewar Jingu-kyo, but has the Ise Grand Shrine branch as its deities and the Association of Shinto Shrines and is headed by Harufumi Hioki, the chief priest of Ikuta Shrine, a Beppyo Shrine, and is not unrelated to Ise Grand Shrine or the Shinto Shrines Agency.

== Officials ==
- Yoritsune Tanaka is the grand priest of Ise Jingu Shrine.

== Bibliography ==
- 井上, 順孝 (April 1991). 教派神道の形成. 弘文堂. ISBN 978-4335160219.
- 菅田, 正昭 (1985). 古神道は甦る. たま出版. ISBN 4884811321.（文庫：1994年.ISBN 4886924603.）
- 西川, 順土 (1988). 近代の神宮. 神宮教養叢書第9. 神宮司庁..
- 村上, 重良 (August 2007). 天皇制国家と宗教. 講談社学術文庫. 講談社. ISBN 978-4061598324.
- 文化庁編さん (February 2011). 宗教年鑑 (PDF) (平成21年版 ed.). ぎょうせい. ISBN 978-4324091975. Archived from the original (PDF) on 2013-01-24.
- 中山, 郁 (March 2009). "國學院大學と教派神道". 史料から見た神道-國學院大學の学術資産を中心に. 弘文堂. pp. 227–247. ISBN 978-4335160561.
