= Taikyo Proclamation =

Proclamation by the Japanese Emperor

The Proclamation of the Great Doctrine (大教宣布, Taikyō senpu) was issued in the name of Emperor Meiji on January 3, 1870 (February 3). It declared Shinto (the "way of the gods") as the guiding principle of the state.

The concept of Divinity was placed on the Emperor, and Shinto become designated as the state religion of the Japanese Empire, which was designated as a state with "unity of religion and rule".

== Commentary ==
After the Meiji Restoration, the theory of unification of ritual and government increased, centering on Kokugaku scholars of the Hirata Atsutane school, which dedicated itself to the restoration of Shinto, and on July 8, 1869, a Missionary Office was established within the Department of Divinities. The Missionary Office was established, and Nakayama Tadayasu was appointed as the missionary director and Fukuha Yoshishige as the vice-director. Fukuha served as Ministry of Divinities, the de facto chief executive officer after the Ministry of Divinities was renamed Ministry of Divinities.

This was followed by the issuance of an imperial decree in the name of the Emperor Meiji of the time, which set forth the principle of "clarifying the doctrine of jikkyo and proclaiming the way of godliness. In direct opposition to Christianity, it proposed the promotion of Shinto and national protection through Missionary Offices.

However, the confusion caused by the movement to abolish Buddhism, the conflict with the Confucian-Buddhist philosophy of the clans that still functioned as local governments, and the conflicts among national scholars within the Ministry of Divinities, combined with the demand from the west to stop the suppression of Christianity, led to the continued sluggish movement toward Shinto nationalization The establishment of the Ministry of Religion on March 14, 1872 (April 21, 1872), the separation of Miyanaka rituals, and the abolition of Missionary Office forced a review of the Taikyo Mission, and the Taikyo Institute, which aimed to rebuild and strengthen the line of the Taikyo Mission, was established the following year. The following year, the Taikyo Institute was established with the aim of rebuilding and strengthening the line of the Taikyo Mission.

== Three Great Teachings ==
In the proclamation, there was a promotion of three great teachings:

1. Respect for the gods, love of country;
2. Making clear the principles of Heaven and the Way of Man;
3. Reverence for the emperor and obedience to the will of the court.

These are still kept by Shintō Taikyō. The "Taikyo" is the same as the "Great Teachings" of the Great Teaching Institute, and the Taikyo of Shintō Taikyō.

== See also ==
- Kyodo Shoku
- Missionary Office
- Shendao Shejiao
- Unity of religion and rule
