= Kogakkan University =

Coordinates: 34°29′13″N 136°43′36″E

- 皇學館大学 (Kogakkan Daigaku)
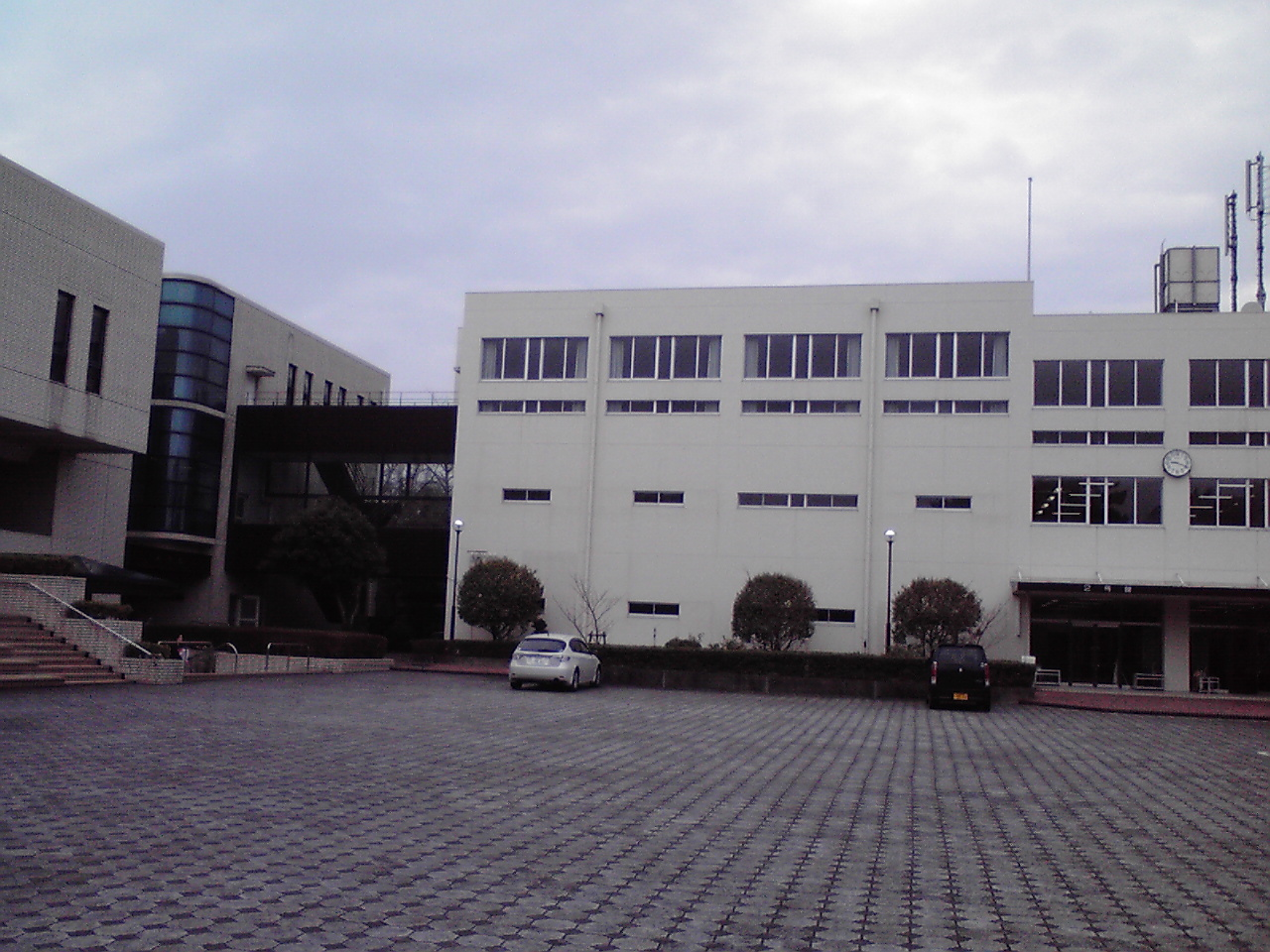
- Type: Private
- Established: 1882
- Founder: Jingu-kyo
- President: Satoshi Kawano (河野訓)
- Students: 2,921
- Undergraduates: 2,839
- Postgraduates: 82
- Location: Ise, Mie, Japan
- Colors: Deep Purple
- Website: kogakkan-u.ac.jp

Kogakkan University (皇學館大学, Kōgakkan daigaku) is a private university at Ise, Mie, Japan. The predecessor of the school was founded in 1882, and it was chartered as a university in 1940.

Kogakkan University is one of only two universities in Japan to offer a Shinto studies program, whose graduates earn the qualifications needed to become a kannushi (Shinto priest). The other university to offer such a program is Kokugakuin University in Tokyo.

== Education and Research ==
=== Departments ===
- Literature
  - Shinto
  - Japanese Literature
  - Japanese History
  - Communication
- Education
  - Education
- Contemporary Japanese society
  - Contemporary Japanese society

=== Graduate programs ===
- Literature
  - Shinto specialization
  - Japanese Literature specialization
  - Japanese History specialization
- Education
  - Education specialization

=== Special Programs ===
- Shinto Studies Graduate Program

== Facilities ==
- Sagawa Memorial Museum of Shinto and Japanese Culture, Kogakkan University, university museum on Shinto.
- The university library holds one of only two surviving manuscripts of the Jingifudenzuki, a medieval text central to the Watarai (Ise) Shintō tradition, the other being held at Matsunoo Shrine.

== Notable people ==
=== Faculty and staff ===
- Yamada Yoshio, linguist
- Shigeru Yoshida, former Prime Minister of Japan
- Shuichi Toyama, archaeologist and historian
- Hideki Togi, composer and actor
- Hiroya Ino, politician and MP

=== Alumni ===
- Hirokazu Shiba, politician and MP
- Ochiai Naobumi, poet and literary scholar
- Mika Ōkura, female baseball player
- Eiraku San'yūtei, rakugo performer, student of San'yūtei Enraku V
