= Saisei Itchi =

Japanese political concept

Saisei itchi (祭政一致) is a Japanese term meaning "unity of worship and government". Under a saisei itchi system, the political leader is also the religious leader.

In Japan, unity of religion and rule can be traced back to the theocratic Yamato Kingship and Ryukyu Kingdom of ancient times where the proclamations of spiritual mediums had political authority. Saisei itchi is an inherent feature of the Shinto religion as the emperor is both leader of the country and priest to Japan's kami, though this aspect has not been focused on since the end of World War II. However, Japanese theologian Keiichi Yanagawa argued a ritual government is different from a theocracy as a theocracy is a government managed directly by a member of that religion's clergy.

== History ==
The term saisei itchi first appeared in late Mito scholarship in reference to the ancient system of governance in Japan which was one with ritual. It was later taken up by the government of the Meiji Restoration as a slogan and policy as they aimed to reunite ritual and government.

On March 13, 1868, the government of the Meiji Restoration announced the restoration of the emperor and the reestablishment of the Department of Divinities in a Dajō-kan Futatsu (太政官布達; Dajōkan Notice). On April 25, 1869, Emperor Meiji personally performed priestly functions in the Ceremonial Hall of the palace, demonstrating this principle of united government and ritual. While the emperor's palace had previously been a religious institute of its own as it housed kami, with the Meiji government, these ritual activities were made known to the public who were ordered to worship the kami, and some rituals were to be held at Ise Shrine at the same time. While government funding did vary during the system of State Shinto, at its highest, officially recognized shrines received tribute directly from their prefectural governor, while private shrines—shrines that were Unranked Shrines in the modern system of ranked Shinto Shrines—were ineligible for funds.

The term saisei itchi also appears in the Taikyo Proclamation issued on January 3, 1870. Part of the saisei itchi policy of the Meiji government included the separation of Shinto and Buddhism, a process which some took to an extreme, resulting in the destruction of many Buddhist artworks and artifacts.

While the Meiji government's policy had been one of saisei itchi from the beginning, this conflicted with the Meiji Constitution as it provided the people with the freedom of religion. However, the definition of religion in the constitution was unclear, allowing for the government to take the stance that the rites of State Shinto were not religious in nature, and therefore separate legally and administratively from other religions.

This policy was officially dissolved during the American occupation of Japan post-World War II with the issuance of the Religious Corporations Order followed by the Religious Corporations Act.

== See also ==
- Department of Divinities
- Theocracy
- Separation of church and state
- State Shinto
- Controversies surrounding Yasukuni Shrine
- Caesaropapism
- Bureau of Shinto Affairs

== Bibliography ==
- Agency for Cultural Affairs (1988). Japanese religion: a survey. Kodansha international. ISBN 978-4-7700-0955-5.
- Hardacre, Helen (1989). Shintō and the state, 1868-1988. Studies in church and state. Princeton, N.J: Princeton university press. ISBN 978-0-691-07348-4.
- Kōno, Seizō (August 1935). 歴代の詔勅 [Imperial Edicts throughout History] (in Japanese). 日本文化協会出版部.
- Nigosian, S. A. (January 1, 1994), World Faiths, Bedford/st Martins; 2nd edition, pp. 217–218, ISBN 978-0312084141
- Ono, Sokyo (1962). Shinto The Kami Way.
- Tamaru, Noriyoshi; Reid, David, eds. (1996). Religion in Japanese Culture, Where Living Traditions Meet a Changing World. Kodansha International. ISBN 4-7700-2054-6.
- Teeuwen, Mark (2017). "Clashing Models: Ritual Unity vs Religious Diversity". Japan Review (30): 39–62. ISSN 0915-0986.
- Yamakami, Izumo (December 1, 1989). 古代神道の本質 [The Nature of Ancient Shinto] (in Japanese). Hosei University Press. pp. 84–100. ISBN 978-4588306013.
- Yasumaru, Yoshio; Miyachi, Masato (2000). 日本近代思想体系：宗教と国家 [Modern Japanese System of Thought: Religion and Nation] (in Japanese). Tōkyō: Iwanami shoten. ISBN 978-4-00-230005-4.
- 世界大百科事典&マイペディア 第2版[CD-ROM], ISBN 978-4816981838
- 広辞苑 第六版 DVD-ROM版, ISBN 978-4001301618
- 安丸良夫・宮地正人編『日本近代思想大系5 宗教と国家』岩波書店, 1988, ISBN 978-4002300054
