= Prince Arisugawa Takahito =

Japanese prince (1813–1886)

Arisugawa Takahito 有栖川宮 幟仁親王
- Prince Arisugawa Takahito
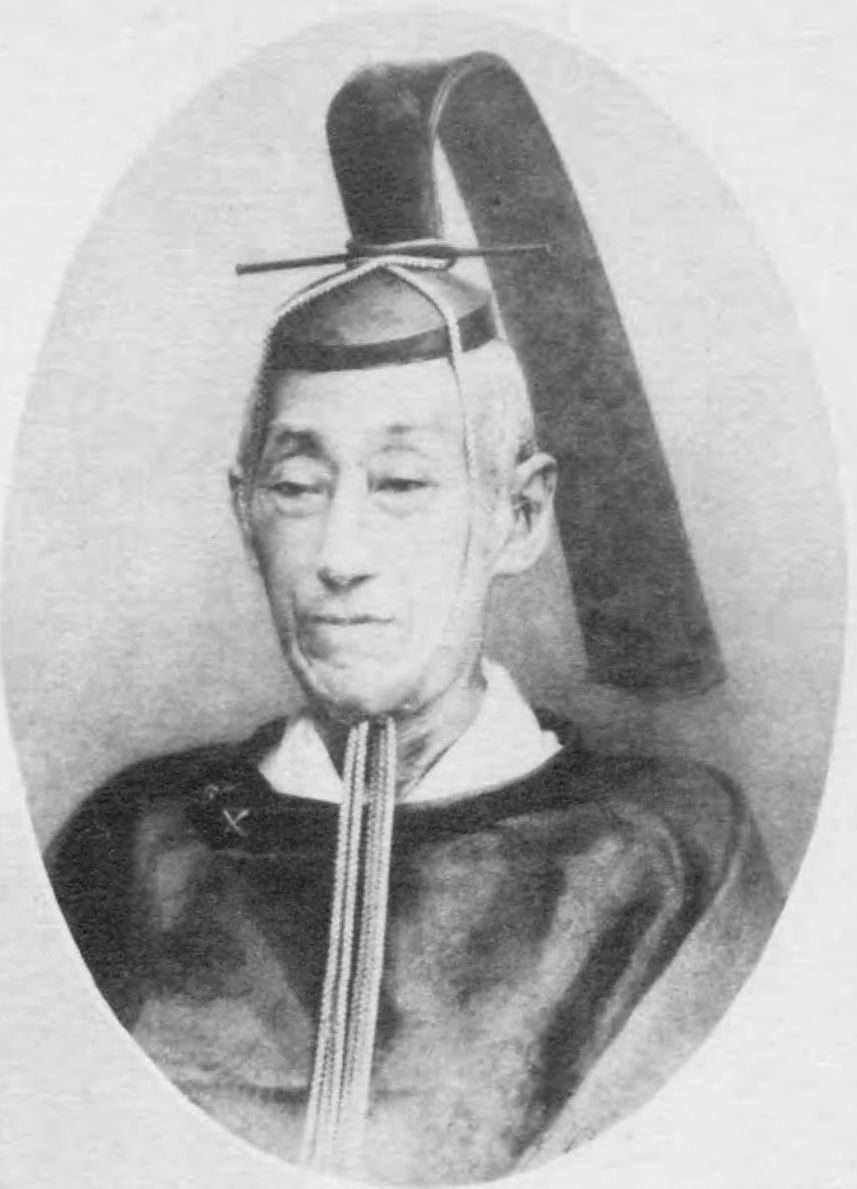
- Born: 17 February 1813; Kyoto, Japan
- Died: 4 July 1886 (aged 73); Tokyo, Japan
- Spouse: Nijō Hiroko
- Father: Prince Arisugawa Tsunahito
- Mother: Toshima Katsuko

Prince Arisugawa Takahito (有栖川宮幟仁親王, Arisugawa-no-miya Takahito-Shinnō; 17 February 1813 – 4 July 1886) was the eighth head of the Arisugawa-no-miya (有栖川宮家) house, one of the shinnōke branches of the Imperial Family of Japan, which were eligible to succeed to the Chrysanthemum Throne in the event that the main line should die out.

== Family ==
- Father: Prince Arisugawa Tsunahito
- Mother: Toshima Katsuko
- Wife: Nijō Hiroko (二条広子)
- Concubine: Yuko Saeko (佐伯祐子)
  - 1st Son: Prince Arisugawa Taruhito ( 有栖川宮熾仁親王, 17 March 1835 – 15 January 1895)
  - 2nd Daughter: Princess Somemiya (染宮王; 1836 –1843)
  - 2nd Son: Prince Kakumiya ( 洁宮王; 1838 –1843)
- Concubine: Chiyo Yamanishi (山西千世)
  - 1st Daughter: Itonomiya Takako (1835–1856) adopted by Tokugawa Ieyoshi
  - 3rd Son: Prince Nagamiya (長宮王;1840–1843)
- Concubine: Noriko Mori (森則子)
  - 3rd Daughter: Princess Noriko (宜子女王; 1851– 1895)
  - 4th Daughter: Princess Arisugawa Toshiko (貞愛親王妃利子女王; 1858 - 1927)
  - 4th Son: Prince Arisugawa Takehito (有栖川宮威仁親王, 13 January 1862 – 05 July 1913)

== Biography ==
Prince Takahito was born in Kyoto as the first son of Prince Arisugawa Tsunahito. In 1822, he was adopted by Emperor Kōkaku (1771–1840) as a potential heir. The following year he was granted the rank of Imperial Prince by imperial proclamation, with the court title Kazusatai no mikoto. He succeeded his father as the 9th head of the Arisugawa-no-miya house on 2 April 1845.

On 2 June 1848, Prince Arisugawa Takahito married Nijō Hiroko (1819–1875): the daughter of Sadaijin Nijō Narinobu. He had four sons and four daughters, many of whom were by concubines.

Prince Arisugawa was a trusted confidant of Emperor Kōmei (1831–1867). During the unsettled period just prior to the Meiji Restoration, when Sonnō jōi militants battled troops local to the Tokugawa Bakufu in the vicinity of the Kyoto Imperial Palace in July 1864, (an incident known as the Kinmon no Hen), Prince Arisugawa was punished for suspected collusion with Chōshū Domain and sentenced to house arrest.

After the Meiji Restoration, he was restored to the court and promoted to the position of Senior Councilor (gijō). He subsequently served as first director of the Department of Shinto Affairs, where he was influential in the development of State Shinto.

In 1881, he resigned from his political posts and became head of the newly established Research Institute for Japanese Classical Literature (Kōten Kōkyūsho), the forerunner of Kokugakuin University). The prince was a master of waka poetry and Japanese calligraphy. The official copy of the Meiji Charter Oath was in his handwriting, and he supplied many inscriptions for various Buddhist temples and Shinto shrines. His pen-name was Shōzan.

Prince Takahito resigned as head of the Arisugawa-no-miya house in favor of his eldest son, Prince Arisugawa Taruhito, on 9 September 1871. He died in Tokyo on 24 January 1886.
