= Ministry of Religion (Japan) =

Japanese government agency

- 教部省
- Predecessor: Ministry of Divinities, Missionary Office
- Successor: Bureau of Shrines and Temples
- Formation: 1872
- Dissolved: 1877

The Ministry of Religion (教部省, Kyōbushō) was a central government organization of the Empire of Japan established under the Daijō-kan system in the early Meiji period for the purpose of national indoctrination through religion control to replace the Department of Divinities. It sought to advance the Proclamation of the Great Doctrine and mobilize the people with both Shinto and Buddhism.

It was abolished in response to arguments for separation of church and state and the Bureau of Shrines and Temples taking over much of its functions.

== Outline ==
On April 21, 1872, the Ministry of Divinities was reorganized into the Ministry of Religion. The Ministry of Popular Affairs, and established by merging the Ministry of Popular Affairs Shakaiji Kake. Following the failure of the national teaching based on Shinto and Confucianism by the Missionary Office established within the Shinto priesthood, the largest religious force of the time, Buddhism, especially Jōdo Shinshū, which was the largest religious force at the time. While implementing modern religious policies such as the lifting of the prohibition of Christianity and the lifting of Nyonin Kinsei in shrines and temples, the Department of Divinities was unable to achieve the national indoctrination that was required by the Interlocutors. In order to realize national indoctrination, which the Department of Divinities was unable to achieve, a system of Kyodo Shoku was established, and the Great Teaching Institute was used for national indoctrination and Proclamation of the Great Doctrine campaign.

The Ministry of Religion was a voluntary sector appointment system. Religious figures—such as shinkans, Kannushis, Bhikkhus, Rakugoka, Waka poets, haiku poets—were also appointed as instructors. The highest rank in the Ministry of Education was kyosei, and in order to further promote the teaching of the people, the Great Teaching Institute was established to oversee the entire nation, the Chukyoin (中教院) to oversee each prefectural unit, and the Shukyoin (小教院) were established throughout the country. However, the Great Teaching Institute did not achieve much due to serious conflicts of opinion between the Shintoists, who were then up-and-coming, and the Jodo Shinshu, who had maintained their old power.

== Issues surrounding the Ministry of Religion ==
The Ministry of Religion was created in response to the failure of the missionary policies of the Divine Council and the missionary messengers, but ultimately resulted in its abolition. One of the reasons for this was the confusion in the religious administration at the time. The government initially intended to use the authority and grounding of traditional religions to defend Christianity and to teach the people about the new system after the Restoration, but in order to establish a modern state, the Separation of church and state and freedom of religion as basic policies of the state were inevitable, and the lifting of the ban on Christianity became essential for diplomatic relations with Western countries. In addition, the government was skeptical of the existence of the Ministry of Religion, believing that the objectives of missionary policy could be achieved through the establishment of The Modern School System, and the above confusion caused the existing religious forces to move left and right. The above confusion caused the existing religious forces to move to the right and left. In the midst of such confusion, Buddhist forces, which had been outnumbered by the Shinbutsu bunri, supported the Meiji Restoration, especially the Defeat the Shogunate Movement However, the Ikkō-shū led to a growing opposition to the government from within the Jōdo Shinshu sect, and the Ministry's measures ran into a deadlock. When the Ministry's measures ran into a deadlock, the Jodo Shinshu movement withdrew from the organization from the standpoint of separation of church and state.

== The Great Teaching Institute's Temple Issue ==
The Great Teaching Institute, which was the national governing body for the Ministry of Religion, was established within Zojoji Temple in Shiba, Tokyo. The establishment of the Great Teaching Institute was a Buddhist initiative, and Zojoji's donation of facilities was voluntary, but when Shinto forces began to take control, the temple refused to accept the donation. However, the dedication of Zojoji Temple went ahead as planned, and the main hall of Zojoji Temple was taken over as the Great Teaching Institute and used as the worship hall of the Great Teaching Institute's Temple. Furthermore, the temple's rituals required the participation and worship of priests, which angered some of the Buddhist authorities (some priests, on the other hand, enthusiastically expressed their blessing by displaying banners and other symbols). Later, on January 1, 1874, the old main building of Zojoji Temple was burned down by arsonists from the former Satsuma Clan, who were opposed to the establishment of a shrine in the Buddhist temple. The shintai was temporarily moved to Shiba Tōshō-gū, and then to a temple newly established by Shinto forces at the Bureau of Shinto Affairs.

== Officials ==
Secretary of Religion

- Saga Sanenaru (1872)
- Ōki Takatō (1872–1873)

Vice Secretary of Religion

- Fukuba Bisei (former Vice Secretary of Ministry of Divinities - 1872)
- Shishido Tamaki (1872–1877)

Teaching position

- See Kyōdō Shoku

== See also ==
- State Shinto
- Department of Divinities
- State religion
