= Missionary Office =

Former Japanese government organization

- Predecessor: Department of Divinities
- Successor: Ministry of Religion
- Formation: 1869
- Dissolved: 1872
- Parent organization: Ministry of Divinities

The Missionary Office (宣教使, senkyōshi) was one of the government offices in Japan during the Meiji period (1868-1912).

The mission was found to be too socially divisive and the office was abolished in 1872 and replaced with the Ministry of Religion, which was presented as neutral between Shinto and Buddhism.

== See also ==
- Kyodo Shoku
- Taikyo Institute
- Taikyo Proclamation
