= Ministry of Religion =

Ministry of Religion can refer to the following

- Ministry of Religion (Japan)
- Ministry of Religion (Serbia)

== See also ==
- Ministry of religious affairs
