= Shintō Taikyō =

Japanese Shintoist organization established by Meiji officials in 1873

Coordinates: 35°39′25″N 139°43′21″E

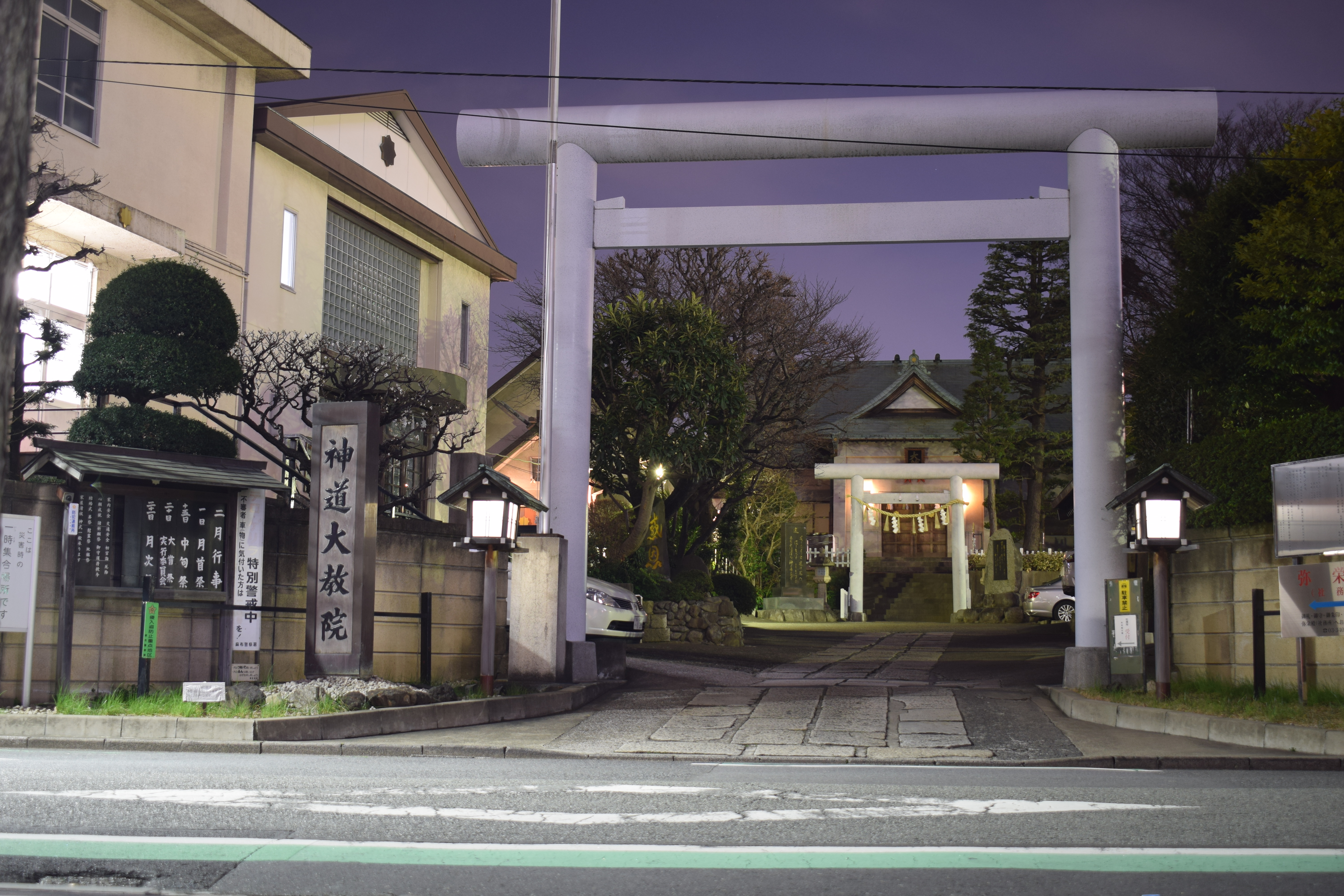
- Predecessor: Bureau of Shinto Affairs
- Formation: 1886
- Founder: Inaba Masakuni

Shintō Taikyō (神道大教), formerly called Shintō Honkyoku (神道本局), is a Japanese Shintoist organization, and was established by Meiji officials in 1873. It is recognized officially, and its headquarters are in Tokyo. It has many shrines, and Tenrikyo used to be under its jurisdiction.

Its teachings focus on the early kami of the Kojiki narrative such as Ame-no-Minakanushi.

It is one of the thirteen shinto sects. It used to be very influential but its influence diminished and continues to diminish due to the prevalence of powerful sects such as Tenrikyo and Izumo-taishakyo.

Its name 'Taikyo' refers to the Three Great Teachings first stated in the Taikyo Proclamation, and it is linked to the historical Taikyo Institute.

== Three Great Teachings ==
The organization follows these Three Great Teachings, which date back to the Taikyo Proclamation:

1. Respect for the gods, love of country;
2. Making clear the principles of Heaven and the Way of Man;
3. Reverence for the emperor and obedience to the will of the court.

== See also ==
- Izumo-taishakyo
