= Kō (lecture) =

An association or meeting of an association

The Japanese term kō (講) is a general term for an association or organization, as well as a religious term used for the services and gatherings held by such an association.

It originally referred to collections of monks who would gather in temples to analyze and research Buddhist texts, but eventually expanded to include Buddhist services, particularly those involving the recitation of Buddhist texts. From this, the term expanded further to include folk religion services and the associations that hold them, and then later to include certain types of mutual aid organizations and associations.

== Original meaning and evolution ==
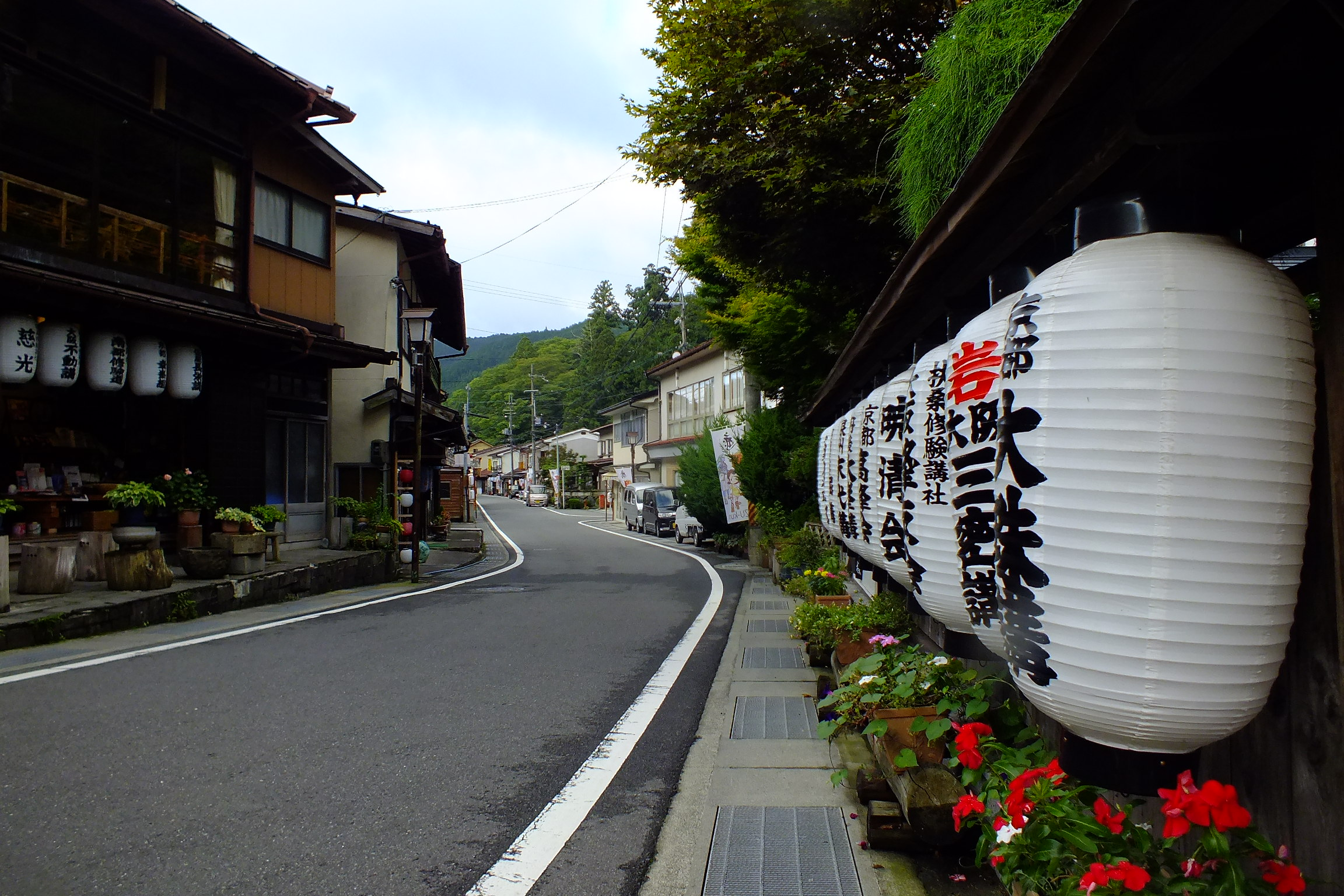
Chōchin paper lanterns at the front of a ryokan at Dorogawa Onsen, located at the foot of Mount Ōmine, with kō in the name.

During the Heian period, the Buddhist school of Tiantai gained popularity among the Japanese aristocracy who would hold lavish events referred to as hokke hakkō (法華八講; lit. "Lotus Sutra eight kō") in which the eight scrolls of the Lotus Sutra were read over a period of four days. This spurred the development of religious gatherings not focused on the study of Buddhist scripture among non-monks, such as the Hōonkō. As these kō spread through society during the medieval period, many religious organizations were formed with the term kō in the name. These religious organizations included those that formed naturally within local communities as well as those that were introduced from outside.

The former type of kō were operated by ujiko (shrine parishioners) to maintain the shrines of the local ujigami or ubusunagami they worshipped. The kō of high-ranking shrines were formed of members from a wide range, far beyond the scope of the village the shrine was located in. Kō grew more powerful during the Sengoku period as the kōmoto (講元), the head of a kō, was granted jizamurai status or selected from an existing kokunin (国人; locals of particular power such as village heads) or jizamurai. The Kaga ikki was run by a kō of Jōdo Shinshū Buddhists.

As an organization, kō were operated on a semi-democratic basis. The kō, also called kōsha (講社), was formed of members called kōin (講員). The various positions, kōmoto, fuku-kōmoto (副講元; assistant kō chief), and sawanin (世話人; lit. “carer”) were often elected from among the members or assigned by the temple or shrine the kō worshipped at. For more local customs such as worship of mountain kami and chinjugami, family and territorial units formed the membership of a kō, preventing the organization from being solely religious in nature.

Initially, the latter form of kō introduced from outside the local community had their origins in mountain worship. The Shugendō practitioners of mountains such as Mount Tate traveled Japan forming sanpai-kō (参拝講; "pilgrimage kō") encouraging others to climb holy mountains. Shrines and temples around Japan imitated this practice and established kō in order to draw in worshippers. In some cases, all members of these sanpai-kō would travel to the shrine or temple, but, in others, a number of the members were selected as representatives to travel to the shrine or temple and worship there on behalf of their fellows. The evolution of kō as mutual aid organizations such as tanomoshiko began with these representative pilgrimages. Rather than each member contributing money to fund a pilgrimage, members would each contribute funds which were then lent to a member chosen either by lottery or through applications. In addition to religious kō, there were a large variety of groups such as kō for workers in the same field (moai-kō and yui-kō) and kō for people of the same gender or of similar ages (wakaishu-kō (若衆講; youth kō) and kaka-kō (カカ講; Mom kō)). While these kō primarily required members to pay money into the group, there were some free to join whose primary function was recreation, such as yusan-kō (遊山講; picnic kō) which were usually social groups for women.
