= Shuichi Toyama =

Japanese archaeologist and historian

Shuichi Toyama (外山 秀一, Toyama Shūichi, born June 1954) is a Japanese archaeologist and historian, Professor in the Faculty of Letters at Kogakkan University. He specializes in archaeological geography, environment archeology, geomorphology, and the history of geography, and is an expert in ancient Japanese farming practices and the history of the Yamanashi Prefecture. He has conducted much research into rice cultivation in ancient Japan in particular, which has been quoted in numerous publications. In his work related to the environment and archaeology, he has examined the relationship history between nature and human beings, which was the subject of a 2008 book. In 2009 he was a co-author of a book on archaeology of the Jōmon period.
