= Yui (behavior) =

System of collaborative work

Yui (Japanese/Okinawan:結,ゆい) involves a system of collaborative work in small settlements and autonomous units. It consists of mutual aid that helps and cooperates within the residents' village, which requires a great deal of time, money, and effort.

Though the loan word has crept into standard Japanese, the cultural concept is more particular to Okinawan life. Nevertheless, traditional informal fire brigades in other parts of Japan have been considered a type of Yui as labor on demand, in addition to more ubiquitous agricultural collectives.

Yui Maaru 「ゆいまーる」 and Ii Maaru 「いーまーる」 mean "mutual assistance" equal and in order. No reward is expected. They are rooted in Okinawan concepts, not limited to mutual farm work, but also extends to the construction of houses and graveyards, therefore is not completely agriculture based.

Such informal groups are called Yui-gumi 「結い組」. They consist of relatives, friends, neighborhood residents, etc. As modernization progresses and agriculture dies out, the practice is becoming less common and more monetary. However, unlike volunteer moles of Mexico who rescue trapped people in emergencies like quakes, (Topos de Tlatelolco), these informal groups are generalists rather than specialists in a particular task.

It may be compared/contrasted to other societies, such as pumasi (품앗이) culture of Korea.

== Modern associations ==
Notably, the local railway there is named after the concept and practice.
