= Bureau of Shinto Affairs =

Shinto Organization

- Predecessor: Great Teaching Institute
- Successor: Shinto Taikyo, Association of Sectarian Shinto, Office of Japanese Classics Research
- Formation: 1875
- Dissolved: 1886

Bureau of Shinto Affairs (神道事務局, Shinto Jimukyoku) was the successor to the Great Teaching Institute, which was founded in 1875. In the religious administration of the Meiji era, it is an organization that brings together Shinto factions nationwide. It was a public central institution. Meiji Government set up a Student Dormitory at the Bureau of Shinto Affairs to train priests. It was also an accreditation body of Sect Shinto.

It served a purpose of training kyodo shoku and over time ran into issues over pantheon disputes. This eventually led to the ascension of the Ise sect and the marginalization of the Izumo sect.

In 1882 it was made into a shinto sect itself due to an ordinance demanding the separation of shrine priests and missionaries or theologians, and in 1884 such missionaries of both shinto and Buddhism were suppressed. The Office of Japanese Classics Research was created as a replacement for it.

In 1886, it reorganized into the Shinto Headquarters (神道本局, Shinto Honkyoku) and the name was later changed to Shinto Taikyo.

In 1912, the so-called The Thirteen Schools of Shinto came together to form the Kyoha Shintō Rengōkai (教派神道連合会, Association of Sectarian Shinto).

== See also ==
- Great Teaching Institute
- Shinto Taikyo
- Kyodo Shoku
- Sect Shinto
