= Kyōdō Shoku =

Japanese religious teachers

Kyōdō shoku (教導職) is a religious position established in the Empire of Japan for the Proclamation of the Great Doctrine. The institution showed little success and was abolished in 1884.

They were divided into 14 ranks.

== History ==
In the 3rd year of Meiji (1870), the Missionary Office was established, and in addition to the clerical staff, the Great Missionary Messengers and others were appointed as instructors for missionary activities. In March 1872, the Missionary Office was merged with the Ministry of Divinities and became the Ministry of Religion.

The teaching ministry was an unpaid official position, and initially all shinkans (there were no Kannushi at that time), Shintoists and Bhikkhu were appointed to this position. Private experts were also appointed. The Great Teaching Institute was established at Zojoji Temple as an institution for research and education, and Chukyoin (中教院) and Shukyoin (小教院) were established in the provinces. Toyama Chukyoin is one of the few surviving Chukyoin, located in Toyama City.

The head priests delivered sermons at various temples and shrines in accordance with the Three Articles of Faith (Respect for God and Patriotism, Humanitarianism, and the Imperial High Priesthood). The content of the sermons centered on reverence for the state and the emperor and the idea of respect for the gods, but they also included family ethics, Bunmei-kaika, internationalization, Rights and Duty, Fukoku kyōhei, and was expected to play a part in national education.

Due to the conflict between priests and monks, a strong opposition movement by Shimaji Mokurai and others, and internal turmoil within the priestly teaching staff, the Daikyo proclamation was unsuccessful. In the 8th year of Meiji (1875), the Great Teaching Institute was abolished and joint Shinto and Buddhist missionary work was suspended. In 1877, the Ministry of Religion was abolished, and in 1882, priests, who were supposed to be the main leaders of the teaching ministry, were banned from holding the same position, and finally in 1884, the teaching ministry was abolished。

Although the activities of the Teaching Office were not conspicuously effective, the system became the model for the systems of Sect Shinto denominations.

== Bibliography ==
- 1999『神道辞典』弘文堂
