= Pumasi =

Pumasi is a traditional form of communal labor in Korean agricultural society.

== Etymology ==
The word pumasi (Korean: 품앗이) is a combination of the words pum which means working, and asi which means repayment.

== Principles ==
Pumasi consisted in working together for the benefit of the community, without taking account of the value of each person's labor contribution. Thus the labor of humans and cattle, male and female, adults and children were equally valued.

Participation was voluntary. The work was guided by the benefit accruing to the community as a whole. The practice presupposed a high level of trust among members of the community.

== Participants ==
Pumasi was mainly practised in small village communities. It occurred particularly among farmers who grew the same crops, cultivated a similar acreage, were related or knew each other's family history. In these situations the required mutual trust was most likely to emerge.

Pumasi was sometimes practised by groups of women and sometimes by groups of both sexes.

== Tasks ==
Pumasi could be involved in any type of farm work throughout the year. It had a very important role in cultivating rice paddy and most other crops. It also included the work of women in preparing food for big events or making clothes for sale. An example was the large-scale annual preparation of kimchi, a preserved foodstuff.

== Comparison with dure ==
A different form of cooperative labor was known as dure or saegyung. Dure was limited to adult able-bodied men, and their participation was mandatory. Dure was organized mainly at rice planting time - the busiest time in the farming year. In contrast, pumasi typically involved small groups of villagers with a personal acquaintance; it could be used for any type of work required by the farmers, and could be organized at any time, whenever an individual household - typically a tenant farmer and one or more farmhands - encountered a labor shortage.

== History ==
Pumasi is the oldest collective laboring custom in Korea. It arose in early class society at the time when the monogamous family became the economic unit of society. A monogamous household would need to call on the labor of other family members in order to solve any shortage of labor it might experience.

== Pumasi today ==
As Korea became more industrialized, the prevalence of generalized wage labor decreased among the agricultural population. Until recently, pumasi still took place to some extent in rural communities, but that aspect has changed greatly. Modernization in rural communities, such as the spread of chemical and mechanical aids to farming, has encouraged the assumption that every activity is done in exchange for cash. So, the concept of equality for workers that forms the basis of pumasi is vanishing, and the value of each worker's labor is calculated and accounted for separately. However, the remnants of pumasi can still be found in the custom of helping each other on the occasion of weddings or funerals.

== See also ==
- Agricultural cooperative

== Sources ==
- Pumasi 품앗이(Britannica Encyclopedia 한국 브리태니커 온라인)
- Pumasi 품앗이(Doosan Encyclopedia 두산백과)
- Pumasi 품앗이 (Encyclopedia of traditional Culture 향토문화전자대전)
- Pumasi 품앗이 (Encyclopedia of Korean Culture 한국민족문화대백과사전)
