= Taikyo Institute =

Shinto organization

Great Teaching Institute
- 大教院
- Predecessor: Department of Divinities
- Successor: Bureau of Shinto Affairs
- Formation: 1872
- Dissolved: 1875
- Parent organization: Ministry of Religion

The Taikyo Institute (大教院, Taikyōin or Daikyōin; Lit. "Great Doctrine Institute") was an organization under the Ministry of Religion in the Empire of Japan.

== History ==
It was founded in 1872 to train kyōdo shōku or religious teachers because the Missionary Office and Department of Divinities were unsuccessful in their national indoctrination objectives. It was intended as a joint Shinto and Buddhist organization, but ended up becoming entirely dominated by Shinto.

Chūkyōin (中教院; "Middle Doctrine Academies") were established in each prefectural capital and Shōkyoin (小教院; "Minor Doctrine Academies") were established in various cities.

On January 1, 1875, an arson attack on the Taikyo Institute caused confusion, with four Jōdo Shinshū sects informally announcing their departure from the Great Teaching Institute.

On May 3, 1875, the Taikyo Institute was dissolved by the Ministry of Religion and replaced with the Bureau of Shinto Affairs and later Shintō Taikyō.

Ame-no-Minakanushi was one of its patron deities, also known under the Buddhist name Myōken.

== See also ==
- Bureau of Shinto Affairs
- Shintō Taikyō
- Kyodo Shoku
- Sect Shinto
- Toyama Chukyoin

== Bibliography ==
- 井上順孝ほか編 (January 1996). 新宗教教団・人物事典. 弘文堂. ISBN 978-4335160288.
- 井上, 順孝 (April 1991). 教派神道の形成. 弘文堂. ISBN 978-4335160219.
- 葦津珍彦 (2006-11-01). 新版 国家神道とは何だったのか (in Japanese). 神社新報社. ISBN 9784915265105.
- 村上, 重良 (April 1974). 慰霊と招魂-靖国の思想. 岩波新書. 岩波書店. ISBN 978-4004121565.
- 村上, 重良 (August 2007). 天皇制国家と宗教. 講談社学術文庫. 講談社. ISBN 978-4061598324.
- 菅田, 正昭 (1985). 古神道は甦る. たま出版. ISBN 4884811321.（文庫：1994年.ISBN 4886924603.）「教派神道に流れる古神道の本質」の章あり.
