= Kinen-sai =

Japanese festival

Kinen-sai (祈年祭; also read Toshigoi-no-matsuri) is a Shinto celebration held to pray for a bountiful rice harvest originally developed in the 8th and 9th centuries which died out during the Muromachi period and was then reintroduced in 1869. While the celebration is originally thought to be agricultural in nature, earliest records show a wide variety of non-rice offerings.
