= Inoue Nobutaka =

Japanese scholar of Shinto

Inoue Nobutaka (Japanese: 井上 順孝; born 1948), is a Japanese scholar of religious studies, who specializes in modern Shinto studies. He is a professor emeritus at Kokugakuin University.

== Education ==
Inoue attended the University of Tokyo in Religious Studies. His thesis was written on the topic of Arguments Regarding Religious Freedom in the Meiji Period. In graduate school he was influenced by Hirata Atsutane, a Japanese theologian who lived during the Edo period.

== Work ==
In 1982, Inoue resigned from his position on the faculty of literature at the University of Tokyo, to take a job at Kokugakuin University. There he founded the Japanese Association for the Study of Religion and Society, and the Religious Information Research Center, an archive centered on the study of modern Japanese religion. Beginning in 1990, he served as co-editor of the definitive work, Encyclopedia of New Religions that covered over 400 religious leaders and 300 new religious groups in Japan. In 1995, he helped to moderate and temper society's responses to the Aum Shinrikyo terrorist attack in Tokyo.

== Selected publications ==
Following the print version, Inoue developed an online version of Encyclopedia of Shinto. Other publications include Shinto: A Short History, 2003, Taylor & Francis, co-authored with Endo Jun, Mori Mizue, Ito Satoshi; Folk Beliefs in Modern Japan, 1994, Institute for Japanese Culture and Classics, Kokugakuin University. Contemporary Japanese Religion, 2000, Foreign Press Center, Japan, among others.

== Honors ==
In 2019, Inoue was elected as an International Honorary Member of the American Academy of Arts and Sciences.

== See also ==
- History of Shinto
