= Kokugakuin University =

Private university in Shibuya, Tokyo, Japan

Coordinates: 35°39′20.3″N 139°42′41.9″E

- 國學院大學
- Type: Private
- Established: 1882
- President: Masayuki Harimono
- Academic staff: 649
- Undergraduates: 2702
- Postgraduates: 108
- Other students: 27 (Shinto studies students)
- Location: Shibuya, Tokyo, Japan
- Campus: Urban
- Website: https://www.kokugakuin.ac.jp/

Kokugakuin University (Japanese: 國學院大學), abbreviated as Kokugakudai (國學大) or Kokudai (國大), is a Shinto-affiliated private research university in Shibuya, Tokyo, Japan. The university consists of undergraduate departments in humanities and social sciences and a graduate school, and specializes in Japanese literature, history, and Shinto Studies.

The predecessor institution was founded in 1882 as an institution of classical and religious learning. Prince Arisugawa Takahito served as the institution's inaugural head.

In Japanese, the university uses kyūjitai characters to stylize its name. In government-published materials and several unaffiliated private publications, shinjitai characters are used instead to write as "国学院大学".

== History ==
The university's predecessor was the Koten Kokyusho, established in 1882 as an institution for the study and dissemination of Japanese classics and training of Shinto priesthood, based on the State Shinto. In 1890 it was expanded into the Kokugakuin (國學院; lit. Academy of National Studies) that offered courses in literature, history, and Japanese law. It acquired the status of university in 1906. In 1918, it expanded with the addition of preparatory, teacher-training, and research divisions, and in 1927, an affiliated Shinto division was added.

The university moved to its present location in Shibuya in 1923, but the original Shibuya campus was destroyed during the Great Kanto Earthquake in September that year. In 1930, the on-campus Shinto shrine was constructed, which stands to this day.

After the end of the Second World War, the Kōten Kōkyūsho was dissolved in 1946, and the university itself was reorganised in 1948 with the single Faculty of Letters, comprising departments of Shinto, History, Literature, and Philosophy. University-affiliated Kokugakuin High School was established the same year. In 1950, the Faculty of Political Science and Economics was established, which was reorganised into the Faculty of Economics in 1966. In 1982 Kokugakuin Women's Junior College Division was established (currently Kokugakuin Hokkaido Junior College).

== Education and research ==
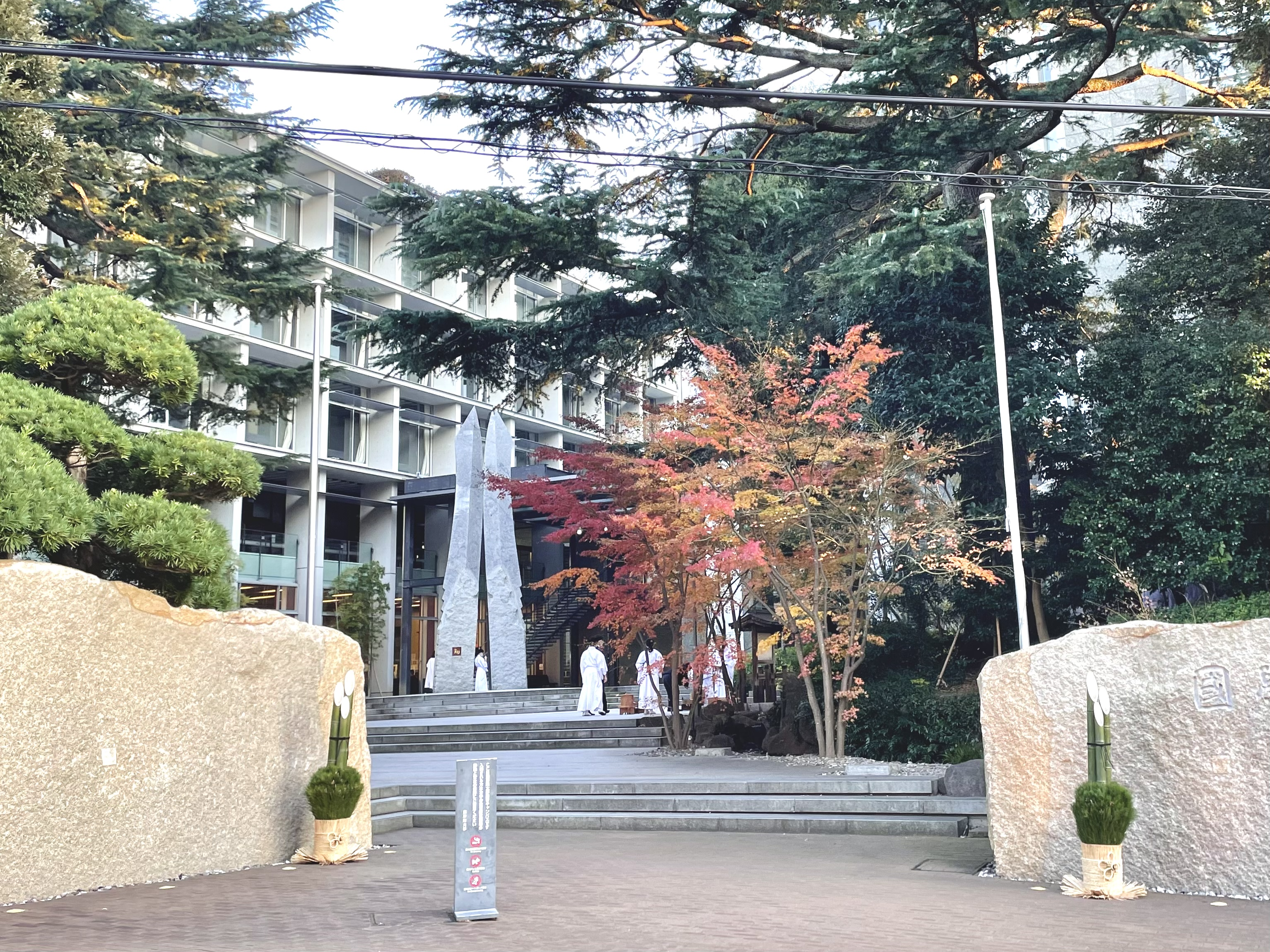
View of main campus

=== Undergraduate Faculties and Departments ===
- Faculty of Letters
  - Dept. of Japanese Literature
  - Dept. of Chinese Literature
  - Dept. of Foreign Literature and Culture Studies
  - Dept. of History
  - Dept. of Philosophy
- Faculty of Shinto Studies
- Faculty of Law
- Faculty of Economics
  - Dept. of Economics
  - Dept. of Business Administration
- Faculty of Human Development
  - Dept. of Elementary Education
  - Dept. of Health and Physical Education
  - Dept. of Child Studies
- Faculty of Tourism and Community Development

Kokugakuin University's Faculty of Shinto Studies is one of two institutions, the other being Kogakkan University Faculty of Letters, that provides courses to obtain kannushi (Shinto priest) qualifications.

=== Graduate Schools ===
- Graduate School of Letters
  - Shinto and Religious studies field
    - Shinto Studies
    - Religious Studies
  - Literature field
    - Japanese Literature
    - Japanese Language
    - Chinese Literature
    - Oral Traditions
    - Advanced Japanese and Japanese Language education
  - History field
    - Japanese History
    - Foreign History
    - Archaeology
    - Aesthetics and Art History
    - Museum Studies
- Graduate School of Law
  - Jurisprudence
  - Political Science
- Graduate School of Economics

=== Junior College Division (two-year programs) ===
- Japanese literature
- Communications
- Child Education

=== Affiliated facilities ===
- Japanese Literature Research Institute
- Dr. Orikuchi Memorial Ancient Research Institute
- Shinto Reference Facility
- Archaeology Reference Facility
- Dr. Kōno (河野, Kōno) Memorial Room
- Dr. Takeda (武田, Takeda) Memorial Room

== People and organizations related to Kokugakuin ==
=== People and organizations ===
Alumni, professors, and others related to the school are known as In'yū (院友; lit. friends of the academy) There is a graduate's association called the In'yū Association, and a meeting hall called the In'yū Hall at the Shibuya campus. Most Shinto priests at shrines across Japan are In'yū.

=== List of people associated with Kokugakuin ===
- Yōko Kondō (born 1957), Japanese manga artist
- Masumi Asano (born 1977), Japanese voice actress
- Yamazaki Nao-Cola (born 1978), Japanese writer
- Eiko Kano (born 1982), Japanese comedian and musician
- Manamo Miyata (born 1998), Japanese singer
- Momoko Tsugunaga (born 1992), Japanese singer

== Campuses ==
There are also facilities in Sagamihara and other areas.

=== Shibuya campus, Higashi, Tokyo ===
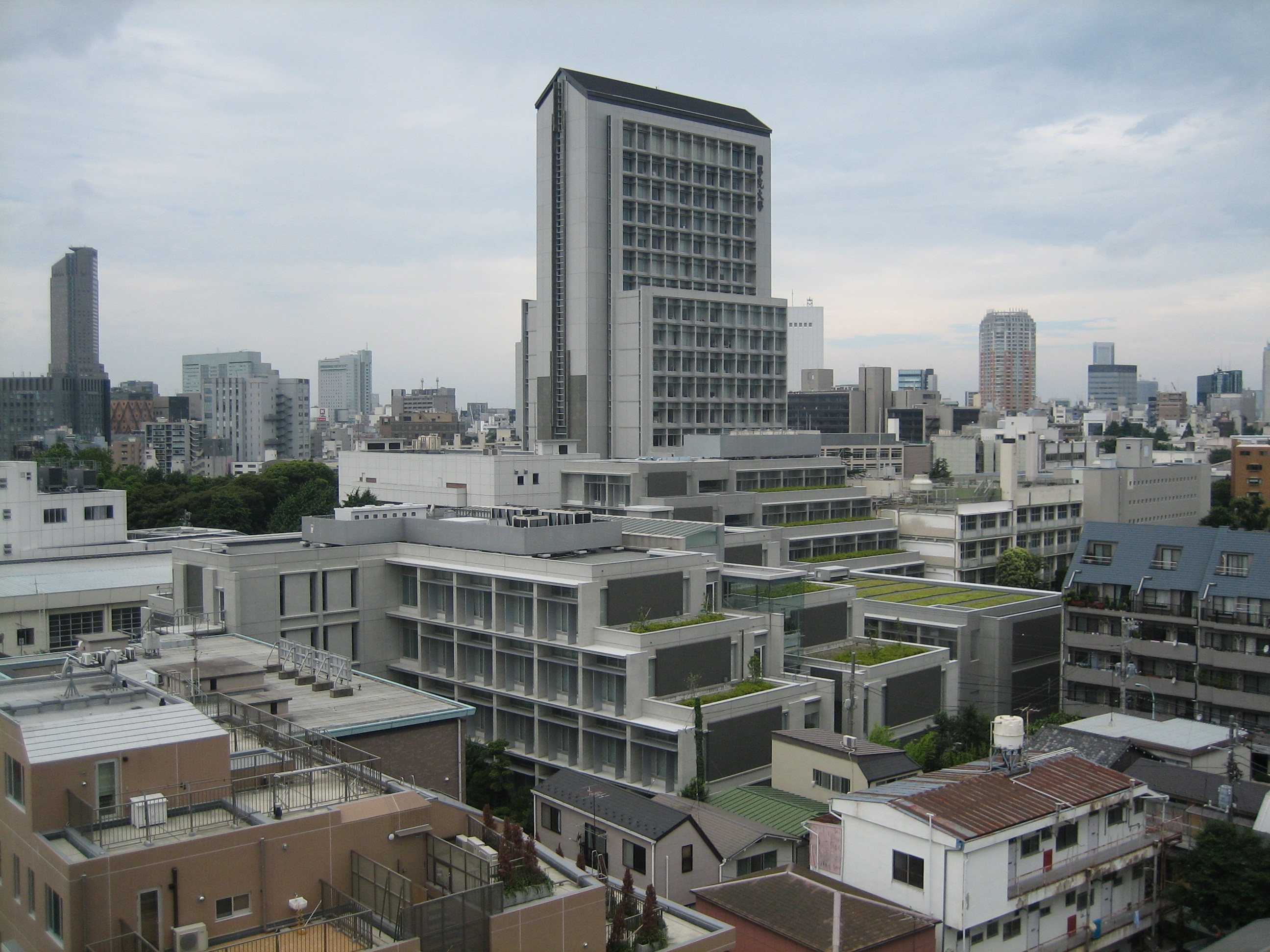
Higashi, Shibuya campus

Higashi 4-10-28, Shibuya-ku, Tōkyō-to (東京都渋谷区東四丁目10番28号)

Closest station is Shibuya station on the Yamanote line.
The Kokugakuin University Museum is on the Shibuya campus. This museum houses an extensive collection of historical and archeological artifacts as well as special exhibits.

=== Tama Plaza campus ===
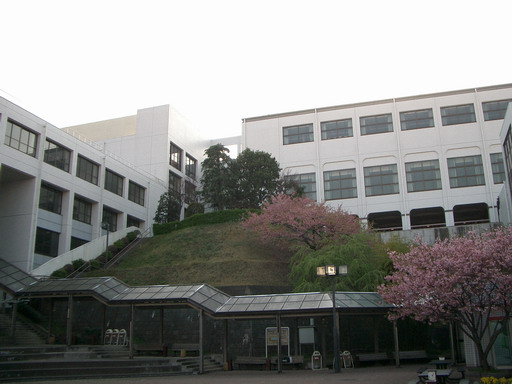
Tama Plaza campus

Shin-Ishikawa 3-22-1, Aoba-ku, Yokohama-shi, Kanagawa-ken (神奈川県横浜市青葉区新石川三丁目22番地1)

Closest station is Tama-Plaza Station on the Tōkyū Den-en-toshi Line.
Has a baseball diamond, sports ground, and tennis courts.

- Sagamihara City has tennis courts and other facilities, but while some clubs and circles make use of the facilities, most students do not use the Sagamihara campus.

== Agreements with other universities ==
- Participant in the Western Tokyo University Credit Interchange Agreement
- Participant in the Yokohama City Educational Exchange Conference
- Participant in the Yamanote Line Consortium

=== Sister Schools ===
Nihon University: This agreement came about when Nihon University's predecessor organization, Nihon Law School, was founded during one night at the Office of Japanese Classics Research. After that, when Kokugakuin's president would change, or when Nihon University's president or board chairman would change, they would go to the partner school to give their greetings. Finally, both parties agreed to begin a sister relationship.

=== Related schools ===
The educational institutions in Tochigi Prefecture listed below operate independently of Kokugakuin University, and exist under a separate incorporated legal entity.

- Kokugakuin University Inc., Tochigi Campus
  - Kokugakuin University Tochigi Junior College
  - Kokugakuin University Tochigi Senior High School
  - Kokugakuin University Tochigi Junior High School
  - Kokugakuin University Tochigi Nisugi (二杉, Nisugi) Kindergarten

=== Affiliated schools ===
- Kokugakuin Junior College
- Kokugakuin Senior High School
- Kokugakuin University Kugayama Junior and Senior High School
- Kokugakuin University Kindergarten
- Kokugakuin Kindergarten
- Kokugakuin University Child Education Vocational School

== Official website ==
Media related to Kokugakuin University at Wikimedia Commons

- Kokugakuin University
- Kokugakuin University (in Japanese)
