= Sagawa Memorial Museum of Shinto and Japanese Culture, Kogakkan University =

Museum in Ise, Mie, Japan

- 皇學館大学佐川記念神道博物館
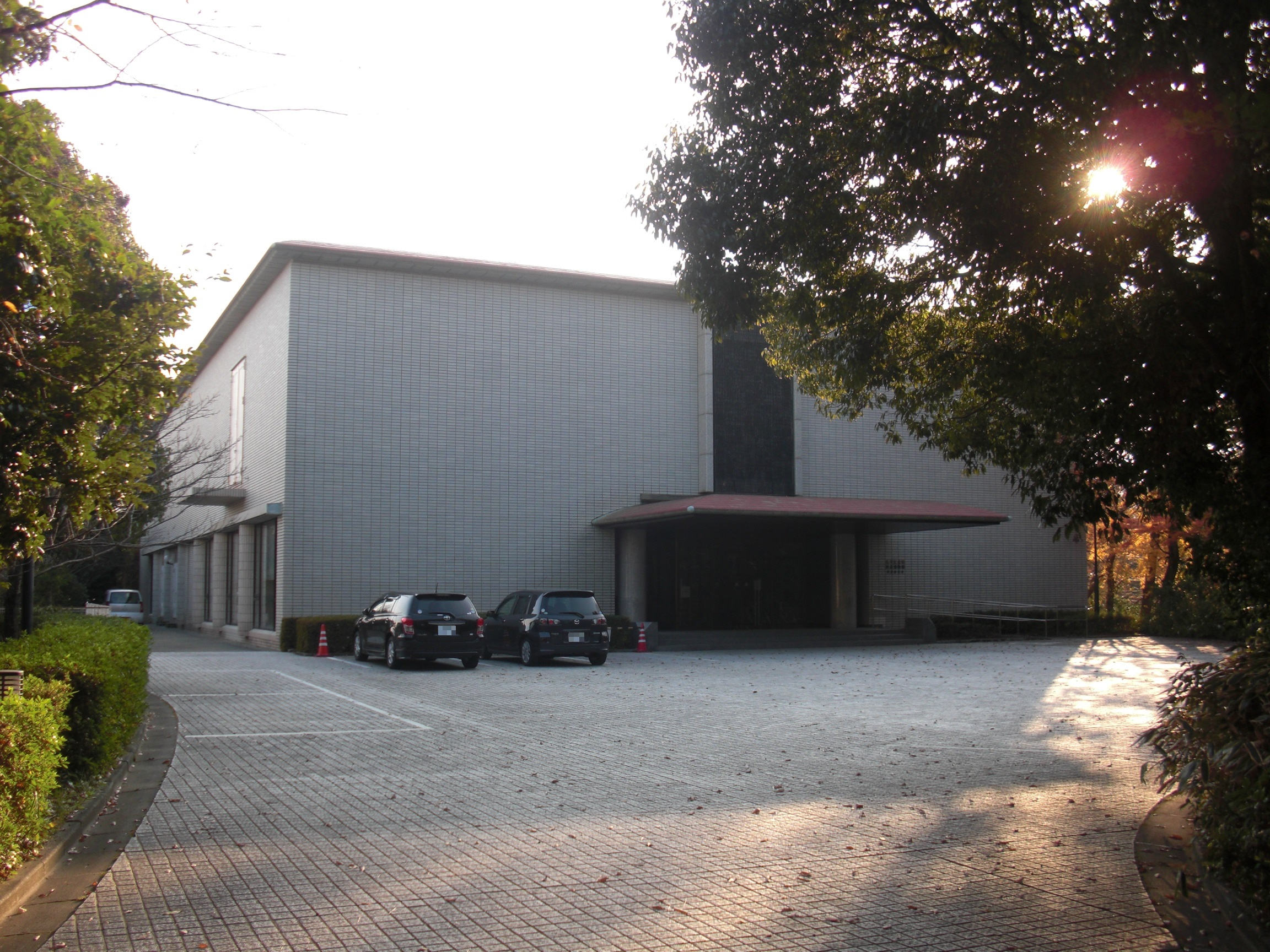
- Interactive map of the Sagawa Memorial Museum of Shinto and Japanese Culture, Kogakkan University area

General information
- Location: 1704 Kodakujimoto-chō, Ise, Mie Prefecture, Japan
- Coordinates: 34°29′03″N 136°43′33″E
- Opened: 26 October 1992

Website
- Official website (ja)

Sagawa Memorial Museum of Shinto and Japanese Culture, Kogakkan University (皇學館大学佐川記念神道博物館, Kōgakkan Daigaku Sagawa Kinen Shintō Hakubutsukan) is a university museum that opened in Ise, Mie Prefecture, Japan in 1992. The collection and displays recount Japanese history, culture, religion, and thought through a focus on Shinto and Shinto shrines.

== See also ==
- Ise-Shima National Park
- Ise Shrine
