= Department of Divinities =

Japanese state religion office, 700–1871

- Successor: Ministry of Divinities, Great Teaching Institute, Missionary Office
- Dissolved: 1871

The Department of Divinities (神祇官, jingi-kan), also known as the Department of Shinto Affairs, Department of Rites, Department of Worship, as well as Council of Divinities, was a Japanese Imperial bureaucracy established in the 8th century, as part of the ritsuryō reforms. It was first established under the Taihō Code which also established the Council of State (太政官, daijō-kan). However, the Jingi-kan and the Daijō-kan made their first appearance in the Asuka Kiyomihara Code.

While the Daijō-kan handled secular administrative affairs of the country, the Jingi-kan oversaw matters related to Shintō, particularly of kami worship. The general functions of the Jingi-kan included overseeing kami-related affairs at court, managing provincial shrines, performing rites for the celestial and terrestrial deities (天神地祇, tenjin chigi), as well as coordinating the provinces' ritual practices with those in the capital based on a code called jingi-ryō (神祇令), which translates to "Code of Celestial and Terrestrial Deities" or "Code of Heavenly and Earthly Gods".

While the department existed for almost a millennium, there are periods of time in Japanese ancient and medieval history where the Jingi-kan was effectively nonexistent such as when the physical establishment of the department was burned down during the Ōnin War (1467-1477). During the Meiji period, the Jingi-kan was briefly reinstated in 1868 and dissolved in 1871, succeeded by the Ministry of Divinities (神祇省, jingi-shō) and the Ministry of Religion (教部省, kyōbushō).

== Term ==
The term jingi-kan is composed of the Chinese characters kan (官), "council" or "department," and jingi (神祇), which are an abbreviated form of tenjin chigi (天神地祇), "celestial and terrestrial deities." The term tenjin (天神), also known as amatsukami which translates to "celestial deities" or "heavenly gods" encompasses all kami gods in Shintō that reside in Takamagahara or the "High Plains of Heaven," from whom the Japanese imperial line claims descendance. The term chigi (地祇), also known as kunitsukami, translates to "terrestrial deities" or "earthly gods" and encompasses all kami gods in Shinto that reside in or have appeared on the earth. Colloquially, the term jingi can also be used to refer to the rituals performed to the heavenly and earthly gods.

Therefore, there are several ways to translate the term jingi-kan in English:

1. "Department of Divinities" or "Council of Divinities," where the term jingi is used to refer to both heavenly and earthly gods. This is the most common translation used in English.
2. "Department of Rites" or "Council of Rites," where the term jingi refers not to the heavenly and earthly gods but to the rites performed for these gods.
3. "Department of Shinto Affairs" or "Council of Shinto Affairs," where "Shinto Affairs" refer to the general function of jingi-kan, that is to oversee all matters related to Shintō.

== Ritsuryō Jingi-kan ==
This Shintō administrative hierarchy was an intentional mirror of its Chinese counterpart, the Ministry of Rites (禮部). The Jingi-kan was charged with oversight of Shintō clergy and rituals for the whole country.

=== Hierarchy ===
The Jingi-kan was staffed by four levels of managers, as seen below:

Title in Japanese	Romanization	Title in English	Additional Details
従四位下 - 神祇伯	jingi-haku	Director, junior fourth rank lower grade	Japanese bureaucratic title: 大常伯(たいじょうはく, daijōhaku), 大常卿(たいじょうけい, daijō-kei)、大卜令(たいぼくれい, daibokurei)、祠部尚書(しほうしょうしょ, shihōshōsho)
従五位下 - 神祇大副 正六位上 - 神祇少副	jingi-daifuku, jingi-shōfuku	Senior vice-director, junior fifth rank lower grade Junior vice-director (shōfuku), senior sixth rank upper grade	Japanese bureaucratic title: 大常小卿 (だいじょうしょうきょう, daijōshōkyō), 祠部員外郎 (しぶいんがいろう, shibuingairō)
従六位上 - 神祇大祐 従六位下 - 神祇少祐	jingi-daijō, jingi-shōjo	Senior assistant, junior sixth rank upper grade Junior assistant, junior sixth rank lower grade	Japanese bureaucratic title: 大常丞 (たいじょうじょう, taijōjō), 大卜丞 (たいぼくじょう, taibokujō)
正八位下 - 神祇大史 従八位上 - 神祇少史	jingi-daisakan, jingi-shōsakan	Senior secretary, senior eighth rank lower grade Junior secretary, junior eight rank upper grade	Japanese bureaucratic title: 大常録事 (たいじょうろくじ, taijōrokuji), 大卜令史 (たいぼくれいし, taibokureishi), 祠部主事 (しぶしゅじ, shibushuji)、祠部令史 (しぶれいし, shibureishi), 大常主簿 (たいじょうしゅぼ, taijōshubo)
伴部 (神部,卜部,使部,直丁)	tomobe (kanbe, urabe, shibu, jikichō)	Religious functionaries	Tomobe are staffs that serve under these officials. Tomobe is composed of thirty kanbe and twenty urabe, thirty shibu (servants), and two jikichō (laborers).

=== Functions ===
In its early days, the Jingi-kan had four main functions:

1. To carry out annual rites written in jingiryō as well as oversee the overall coordination of shrine rites.
2. To provide the sovereign and his court with ritualists who assist in the performance of palace ceremonies.
3. When misfortune struck or to determine the cause of ominous events, it performs divination to determine the identity of the responsible kami.
4. To conduct the distribution of tribute offerings (heihaku) to shrines for four annual rituals: Kinen-sai (Toshigoi no Matsuri), the spring and autumn Tsukinamisai, and Niinamesai.

=== Annual Rites ===
The Jingi-kan was responsible for carrying out thirteen rites as written in the jingiryō. The rites are laid out in articles 2 through 9, as well as article 18. Those rituals are:

Ritual Title	Chronology	Ritual Details/Purpose
Toshigoi no Matsuri or Kinen-sai	early spring	prayers for a good harvest
Hanashizume no Matsuri	end of the 3rd month	prayers for freedom from illness
Kamu miso no Matsuri	middle of the 4th month	offerings of summer vestments at Ise
Saigusa no Matsuri	4th month	the festival of the Isakawa Shrine in Yamato, a subshrine of the Miwa Shrine
Õmi no Matsuri	4th day of the 4th month	the festival of the Hirose Shrine, for the kami of rain
Kaze no Kami no Matsuri	4th day of the 4th month	the festival of the Tatsuta Shrine, for the kami of wind
Tsukinami no Matsuri or Tsukinamisai	11th day of the 6th month	prayers for a good harvest
Michiae no Matsuri	last day of the 6th month	performed at a crossroads outside the capital, to prevent evil spirits from entering
Hoshi shizume no Matsuri	after Michiae no Matsuri on the last day of the 6th month	prayers to prevent fires at the palace
Great Purification (Ōharai)	half of the year	purifies the emperor and the people of the transgressions and defilements of the first half of the year
Ōmi no Matsuri	4th day of the 7th month	
Kaze no Kami no Matsuri	4th day of the 7th month	
Kamu miso no Matsuri	autumn repetition	
Tsukinami no Matsuri	autumn repetition	
Michiae no Matsuri	winter repetition	
Hoshi shizume no Matsuri	winter repetition	
Kanname-sai	9th and 10th months	special offerings at the Ise Shrines of the wine and food made from the new rice crop
Ainame-sai	11th month	
Niiname-sai	11th month	
Great Purification (Ōharai)	last day of the 12 month	purifies the emperor and the people of the transgressions and defilement of the second half of the year

== Jingi-kan in Medieval Japan ==
From the 10th century to the 15th, the Shirakawa-hakuō family held this position continuously.

In feudal Japan, the Jingi-kan became the final surviving building of the Heian Palace. During the Jōkyū War in 1221, most of the palace was evacuated and fell into disrepair; the Jingi-kan alone remained in operation. A 1624 memoir by a Jingi-haku reports that the Jingi-kan was still being used as late as 1585 and was demolished during renovations. In 1626, a temporary building was constructed to perform additional ceremonies.

== Meiji Jingi-kan ==
On 3 March 1868, Emperor Meiji announced that the new Meiji government would restore direct imperial rule (王政復古, ōsei fukko) and unity of rites and government (祭政一致, saisei itchi). The department was reinstated in 1868 at the beginning of the Meiji period as a provisional step to achieve saisei itchi.

In the seventh month of 1869, the department was further reorganized as an office independent of, and positioned above, the Daijō-kan, echoing the structure of its ancient predecessor; proponents of this restructuring included scholars of the Hirata and Ōkuni schools of kokugaku, respectively represented by Hirata Nobutane and Fukuba Yoshishizu. The reorganized Jingi-kan was headed by Nakayama Tadayasu, with Shirakawa Sukenori as deputy; a separate mausoleum section was placed under Toda Tadayuki, while a propaganda bureau known as Senkyōshi, led by Nakayama with Fukuba as deputy, employed graded ranks of religious instructors.

=== After 1871 ===
In 1870, the Meiji administration attempted to create a new national religion under the term "Great Teaching" (大教, taikyō), primarily to keep Christianity from gaining popularity and influence in the Japanese society and to re-educate the population about the significance of the imperial rule. Consequentially, in addition to overseeing Shintō affairs, the Jingi-kan began to produce propaganda supporting the empire.

The Jingi-kan was demoted to the Ministry of Divinitiesjingi-shō (神祇省), lasting from 1871 to 1872, as part of the saisei itchi campaign, bringing the Jingi-kan to an end.

The goals of the Great Teaching campaign were deemed too ambiguous to be formed into practice, making it difficult for the Jingi-shō to provide theoretical and spiritual content to be spread among the public. The Jingi-shō also lacked staff to oversee their two major functions, Shintō affairs and propaganda. Because of this, the Jingi-shō was dissolved and the Meiji administration established Ministry of Religion (教部省, kyōbushō), also known as the Ministry of Doctrine.

== See also ==
- Engishiki, volume 1-10
- State Shinto
- Unity of religion and rule
