= Shinto priest =

Shinto shrine attendant

Shinto priests (神職, shinshoku) are members of the clergy at a Shinto shrine (神社, jinja) responsible for maintaining the shrine and leading worship of the kami there. In Japanese, they are also commonly referred to as kannushi (神主, "divine master (of ceremonies)"). The characters for kannushi are sometimes also read as jinshu with the same meaning. Kannushi originally referred only to the highest-ranking member of the clergy at a shrine, but has since expanded to become a collective term for all members of the clergy, synonymous with shinshoku.

Another office called shinkan (神官; lit. "religious official") used to exist, but the position was abolished during the removal of Shinto from government oversight during the establishment of the Japanese constitution.

In March 1887, the term shinkan was replaced by shinshoku for priests at kankoku heisha (imperial and national shrines) and lower-ranking shrines, with the exception of Ise Shrine, where the older title persisted. In 1902, a new rank system was introduced at imperial and national shrines, comprising gūji, gongūji (interim head priest), negi, and kujō. Following the establishment of a new priestly department (kanbesho) at Ise Shrine in 1900, the term shinkan came to apply legally only to the daigūji, shōgūji, negi, gonnegi, and kujō of Ise Shrine, until all remaining shrine regulations, including the shinkan qualification, were abolished in February 1946."

== History ==
Very little is known about the operation of shrines in ancient Japan until the advent of the jingi (神祇) cult of shrines under imperial authority during the Heian period, whose priests came from hereditary lines. Most shrines in Japan, however, were not included in the jingi cult and there is almost nothing known about them. In the 8th century, imperial offerings to local shrines were distributed to provincial governors, but by the time the Engi shiki was compiled in the 10th century, these offerings were instead going to hafuri (祝; priests) who were selected from officially assigned kanbe (神戸; kami household), when there was one present, or from a commoner selected to become hafuri by the governor when there was no kanbe.

After the jingi cult and the imperial court declined over the following centuries, shrines and shrine-temple complexes struggled to maintain their lands, particularly from the 14th century onwards. Most village shrines during this period were too poor to have a dedicated priest, and so rituals were conducted by laypeople. Many of these village shrines came to be run by exclusive groups of landowners later referred to as miyaza (宮座), and the village priest was selected from the miyaza members, with the priest often also being the village headman, though it is possible that priests were selected by lottery in ancient times. While miyaza membership was largely limited to men, there were some cases of all-female or mixed miyaza, though the women usually played a lesser role in mixed miyaza. Larger complexes sought to encourage pilgrimages to bring in funds, which in some cases led to the creation of non-clergy positions such as sendatsu (先達) and onshi (御師; also read oshi), particularly in the case of Ise Shrine.

Yoshida Shinto was established in the 15th century by Yoshida Kanetomo who gained the power to distribute shrine licenses as a representative of the emperor. By the mid-16th century, his descendant was distributing these licenses far and wide, and having these licenses determined what ritual garb a priest could wear. The Shrine Article (神社条目, jinja jōmoku) of 1665 detailed how shrine priests obtained court rank, and gave the Yoshida family control over these assignments of rank and the types of ritual garb priests wore, bringing thousands of provincial priests under Yoshida authority. The Yoshida family was opposed by the Shirakawa family in the 18th century who similarly recruited regional priests.

The Yoshida and Shirakawa families lost their power with the Meiji Restoration (1868), though they retained some control over imperial rites. The priesthood was put under the authority of the newly established Bureau of Rites and the Yoshida and Shirakawa licenses were invalidated, requiring priests to be recertified through a national examination, with some removed and replaced. Hereditary priest positions were outlawed in 1871, though many shrine family lines remained intact.

The 1880s and 1890s saw the first unified priesthood when priests across Japan began an organized movement to reestablish the Department of Divinities in order to protect their livelihood, resulting in the establishment of the Fellowship of Shinto Priests (神官同志会, Shinkan Dōshikai) which was renamed to the National Association of Shinto Priests. Several regional organizations were also formed at this time, and priests were urged to refrain from the religious acts of preaching and proselytizing and instead remain enactors of rituals.

The Association of Shinto Shrines was established in 1946 after the dismantling of the State Shinto system during the American occupation following World War II which removed all government support of shrines. While the Association's primary agenda is to rebuild the public function of Shinto rituals, individual priests are free to operate as they wish. A 2024 survey on religious organizations by the Agency for Cultural Affairs found there are approximately 65,000 priests in Shinto-related religions across Japan, though the definition of priest was left open for the answering organization to determine. In the same year, the Association of Shinto Shrines reported having approximately 21,000 registered priests.

== Description ==
Shinto priests can marry, and their children usually inherit their position. Although this hereditary status is no longer legally granted, it continues in practice. Women can also become Shinto priests, and widows can succeed their husbands in their job. Priests are assisted in their religious or clerical work by women called miko.

=== Vestments and ritual objects ===
The clothes priests wear, such as the jōe, the eboshi and kariginu, do not have any special religious significance, but are simply official garments previously used by the Imperial court. This detail reveals the close connection between kami worship and the figure of the Emperor. Other implements used by priests include a baton called shaku and a wand decorated with white paper streamers (shide) called ōnusa.

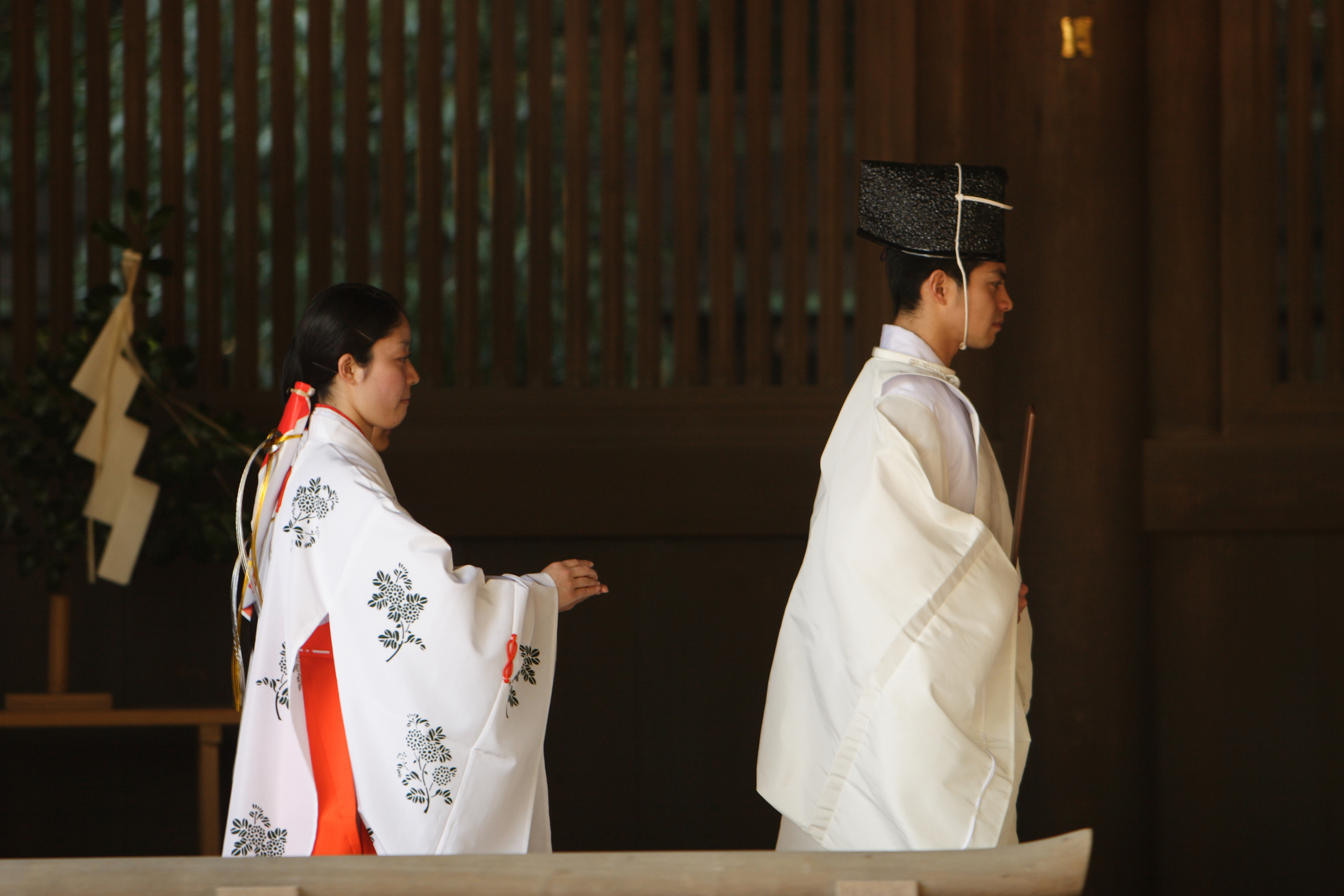
A Shinto priest wearing a jōe being accompanied by two miko

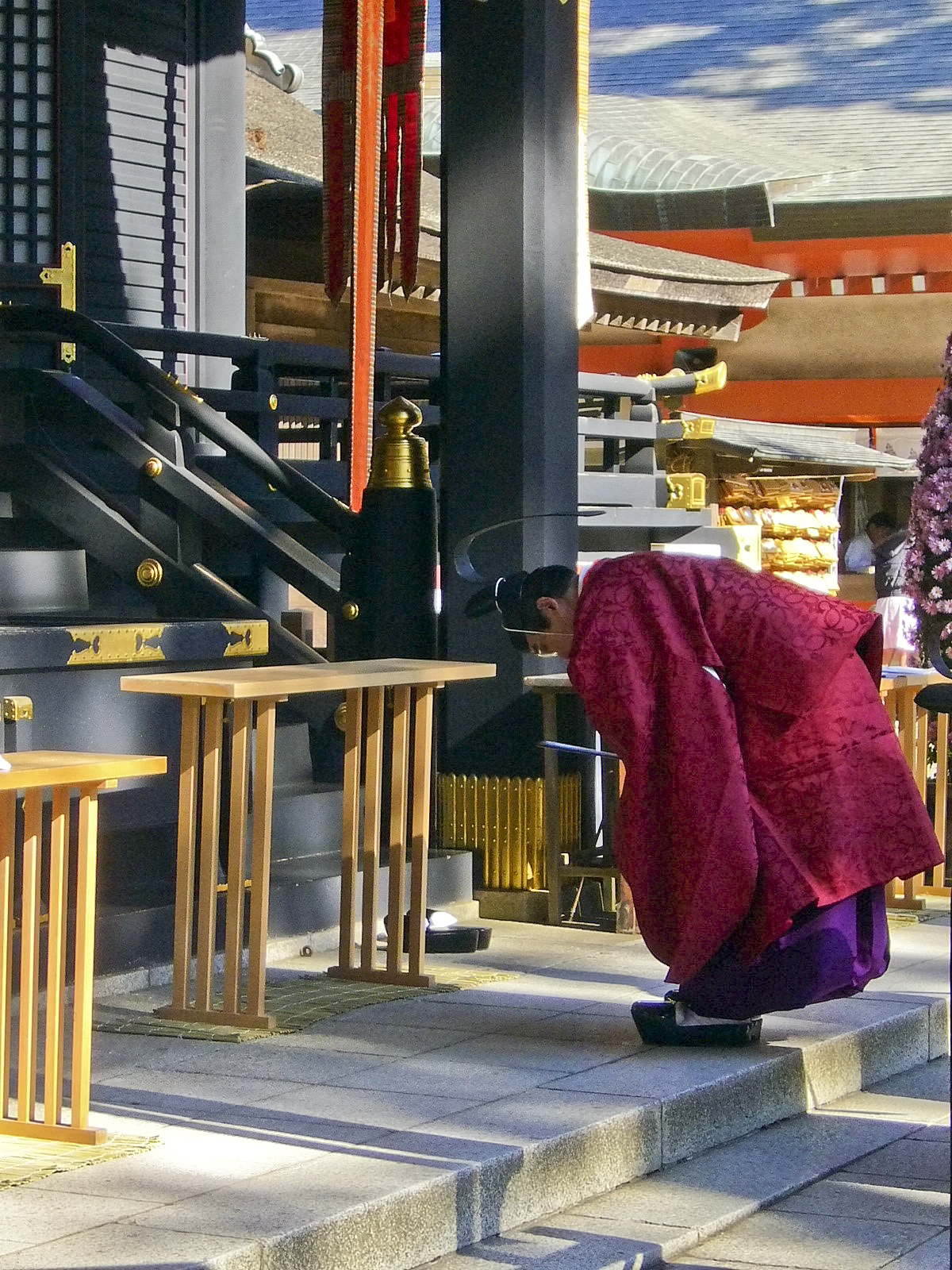
A Shinto priest in full dress, Katori Shrine

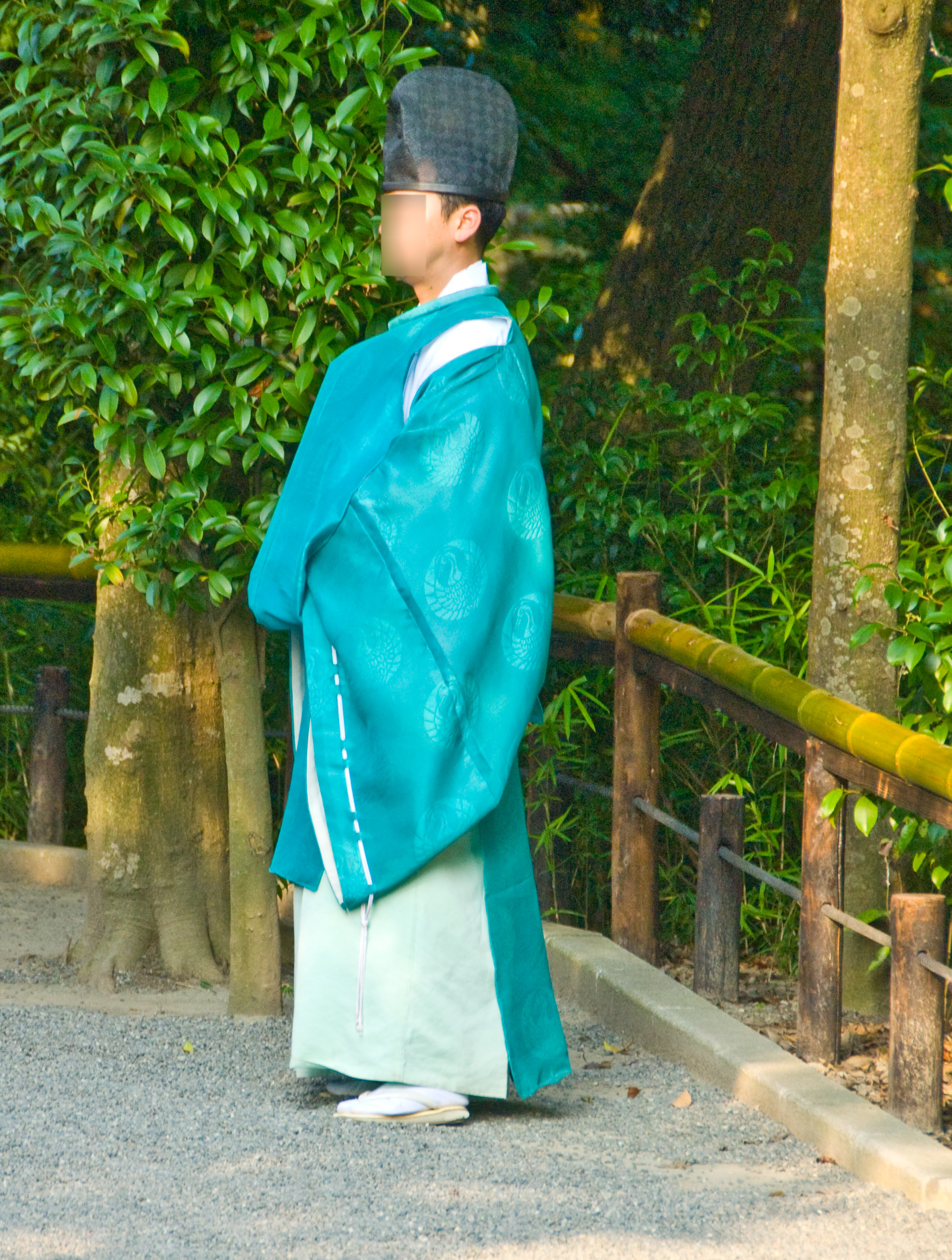
A Shinto priest wearing a kariginu and an eboshi hat

=== Duties ===
The duties of Shinto priests can be broken roughly into five categories:

- Ritual affairs – Preparing for and conducting rituals in the proper manner, including the preparation of edible and non-edible offerings.
- Supply and operations – Logistical management to ensure the shrine obtains materials necessary for its operation.
- Financial affairs – Budgeting, fundraising, eliciting donations, and paying salaries.
- General/miscellaneous – General management, liaising with the Association of Shinto Shrines, etc.
- Grounds and maintenance – Cleaning and repairing the shrine and its grounds.

=== Education ===
To become a Shinto priest, a novice must study at a university approved by the Association of Shinto Shrines, typically Tokyo's Kokugakuin University or Ise's Kogakkan University, or pass an exam that will certify their qualifications.

== Hierarchy, rank, and status ==
Shinto priests are given a rank (階位, kaii) and placed within a hierarchy (職階, shokkai) at their shrine which results in varying levels of relative status, though the relative importance of the shrine they work at has no effect on their status. For example, the head priest of a beppyo shrine is of equal status to a head priest of a small regional shrine. Additionally, rank and hierarchy are not the same, with hierarchy more important for determining status than rank. For example, a head priest of only seikai rank would be higher in status than an assistant priest of the meikai rank.

=== Ranks ===
The Association of Shinto Shrines has regulations that confer one of five ranks called kaii (階位) on clergy members based on their level of education and passing of exams. Up to the second highest rank, meikai (明階), can be reached through study alone. The names of the ranks come from the four virtues of Shinto: purity (浄, jō), light (明, mei), correctness (正, sei), and forthrightness (直, choku). There were originally only four ranks until 1961 when the ranks were reformed and the fourth rank of gonsekai (権正階) was added.

- Jōkai (浄階): The highest rank. Given to those with a long history of contributions to Shinto research.
- Meikai (明階): The rank necessary to become a head priest or assistant head priest at a beppyo shrine. A clergy member with this rank can take a head priest position at any shrine other than Ise Shrine's high head priest position which requires imperial sanction.
- Seikai (正階): The rank necessary to become an assistant priest or interim head priest (宮司代務者, gūji daimusha) at a beppyo shrine.
- Gonsekai (権正階): The rank necessary to become a head priest or interim head priest at a standard shrine, or a junior priest at a beppyo shrine.
- Chokkai (直階): The rank necessary to become an assistant priest or junior priest at a standard shrine.

=== Hierarchy ===
The clergy of a shrine is ranked in a hierarchy called shokkai (職階). The exact hierarchy may vary based on the scale and history of the shrine but, in general, the hierarchy from highest ranking to lowest is head priest (宮司, gūji), assistant head priest (権宮司, gongūji), assistant priest (禰宜, negi), and junior priest (権禰宜, gonnegi), though the assistant head priest position only exists at some beppyo shrines. There is generally only one head priest and one assistant priest per shrine. An overview of their roles is that the head priest is the head of the shrine, the assistant head priest is the secondary leader, the assistant priest supports the head priest in their duties, and the junior priests perform general tasks. Ise Shrine is an exception in that its ranks are as follows: master of ceremonies (祭主, saishu), high head priest (大宮司, daigūji), low head priest (少宮司, shōgūji), assistant priest (negi), junior priest (gonnegi), shrine administrator (宮掌, gūshō), attendant (出仕, shusshi), and apprentice attendant (出仕前, shusshi-mae).

== Women in the priesthood ==
While women were banned from entering the priesthood in the Meiji era, they have been allowed to become priests since the end of World War II. In 1946, they were given the right to become a priest in any rank other than head priest, and then further granted the right to become head priests in 1948. The rhetoric at the time was that this change was to eliminate gender inequality, but that changed in later years to claims that women priests would help solve the problem of the shrinking pool of candidates available to fill priest positions. There are now nearly 3,800 female priests at shrines belonging to the Association of Shinto Shrines, close to 20% of the priesthood.

A 1998 report identified "the female priest problem" as one of the greatest problems facing modern Shinto, broken down into further categories, one of which was menstrual pollution (kegare). Traditionally, menstruating women were prevented from entering holy places, a practice that persists despite the Meiji government's abolishment of that taboo and one surrounding childbirth. There has since been no clarification from the Association of Shinto Shrines on whether they uphold this decision by the Meiji government. This lack of clarification has led to female priests finding solutions themselves, ranging from abstaining from rituals while menstruating, purifying themselves or carrying purifying objects, or simply doing nothing, with some even noting that the Kojiki depicts menstruation as a time when women are even closer to the kami.

== Other positions ==
=== Onshi ===
Onshi (御師; also read oshi) is a low-ranking position at a shrine responsible for leading prayers for visitors, providing lodging and tours for pilgrims, and arranging performances of kagura. They are most associated with Ise Shrine.

=== Lower priests ===
There are two positions that may be called lower priests, gūshō (宮掌) and shuten (主典), though they are not technically considered members of the clergy as they have not yet received their rank (kaii) and are only present in some special shrines, such as Ise Shrine and Atsuta Shrine. They perform some duties under the guidance of higher-ranking priests.

== See also ==
- Miko
- Norito

== Bibliography ==
- Agency for Cultural Affairs (2024a), 令和６年の宗教統計調査の結果 [Results from the 2024 Statistical Survey on Religion] (PDF)
- Agency for Cultural Affairs (December 31, 2024b). "宗教年鑑" [Annual Religion Review] (PDF) (in Japanese).
- Breen, John; Teeuwen, Mark (2010). A new history of Shinto. Blackwell brief histories of religion series. Chichester; Malden, MA: Wiley-Blackwell. ISBN 978-1-4051-5515-1.
- Davis, Winston (1976). "Parish Guilds and Political Culture in Village Japan". The Journal of Asian Studies. 36 (1): 25–36. doi:10.2307/2053840. ISSN 0021-9118.
- Hardacre, Helen (1988). "The Shintō Priesthood in Early Meiji Japan: Preliminary Inquiries". History of Religions. 27 (3): 294–320. ISSN 0018-2710.
- Hardacre, Helen (1989). Shintō and the state, 1868-1988. Studies in church and state. Princeton, N.J: Princeton university press. ISBN 978-0-691-07348-4.
- Kamata, Tōji (March 17, 2016). 神道用語の基礎知識 [Basic Knowledge of Shinto Terminology] (in Japanese). Kadokawa. ASIN B01CJ50CAQ.
- Mirsalis, Dana (2025). "Blood and Logistics". Japanese Religions. 46 (1): 161–187. doi:10.69402/jrxisjp.46.1_161.
- Teeuwen, Mark (1996-08-01). "Jinja Honchō and Shrine Shintō policy". Japan Forum. 8 (2): 177–188. doi:10.1080/09555809608721568. ISSN 0955-5803.
