= Ministry of Divinities =

Japanese government agency

- Predecessor: Department of Divinities
- Successor: Ministry of Religion
- Formation: 1871
- Dissolved: 1872

The Ministry of Divinities (神祇省, Jingishō) was a government organization of the Empire of Japan established on September 22, 1871, replacing the Department of Divinities. On April 21, 1872, it was replaced by the Ministry of Religion.
