= Shinkan (official) =

Government officials serving at Shinto shrines

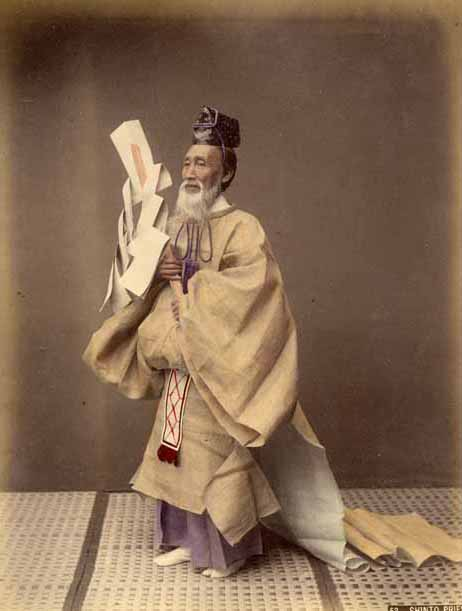
A high priest in 1902, photographed by Kusakabe Kimbei

Shinkan (神官) were government officials serving at shakaku-ranked Shinto shrines in Japan. Commonly, shinkan were officially appointed kannushi.

== Terminology ==
According to the 1884 Daijō-kan decree, shinkan is an official who has been given the status of a government official (kanri) to serve at a shakaku-ranked shrine. However, in 1887, at shrines ranking below kanpei-sha, with the exception of Ise Grand Shrine, the position of shinkan was abolished and the position of shinshoku was introduced. In 1945, Ise Grand Shrine abolished the position of shinkan.

Today, the position of shinkan does not exist, and the kannushi of Shinto shrines are collectively referred to as shinshoku.

== See also ==
- Kannushi
- Modern system of ranked Shinto shrines
- Clergy
