= Danka system =

System of voluntary and long-term affiliation between Buddhist temples and households

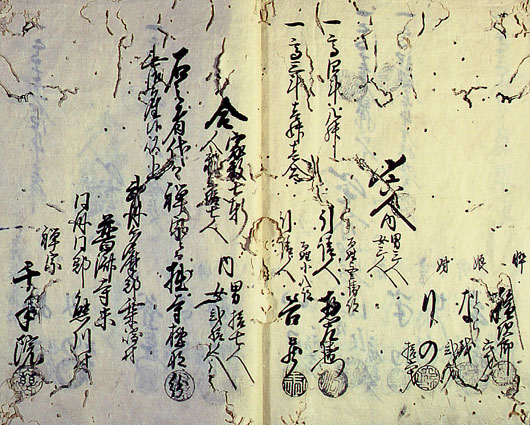
The shūmon ninbetsu aratamechō, or danka register, of a village called Kumagawa near Fussa, Tokyo

The danka system (檀家制度, danka seido), also known as jidan system (寺檀制度, jidan seido), is a system of voluntary and long-term affiliation between Buddhist temples and households in use in Japan since the Heian period. In it, households (the danka) financially support a Buddhist temple which, in exchange, provides for their spiritual needs. Although its existence long predates the Edo period (1603–1868), the system is best known for its repressive use made at that time by the Tokugawa, who made the affiliation with a Buddhist temple compulsory to all citizens.

During the Tokugawa shogunate, the system was turned into a citizen registration network; supposedly intended to stop the diffusion of Christianity and help detect hidden Christians, it soon became a government-mandated and Buddhist temple-run system to monitor and control the population as a whole. For this reason, it survived intact long after Christianity in Japan was thought to have been eradicated. The system as it existed in Tokugawa times is sometimes called terauke system (寺請制度, terauke seido) because of the certification (or terauke, because the tera, or temple would issue an uke, or certificate) issued by a Buddhist temple that a citizen was not a Christian.

The mandatory danka system was officially abolished during the Meiji period, but continues nonetheless to exists as a voluntary association between the two sides, constitutes a major part of the income of most temples and defines as before the relationship between households and temples.

== The terauke ==
The danka system changed drastically in 1638 when, in reaction to the Shimabara Rebellion (1637–38), the bakufu decided to stamp out the Christian religion using it as a tool. The relationship between temple and danka, until then voluntary, was formalized and made compulsory: Buddhist temples were ordered to start writing terauke certificates for all their danka (檀家), while households on their part had the duty to become danka of the closest Buddhist temple, regardless of its sect (Nichiren, Jōdo, Rinzai, etc.), and to obtain from it a terauke. Although never written into law, this use of the system nonetheless quickly became a universal and extremely important feature of Tokugawa Japan. Administratively speaking, all Japanese, Shinto priests included, became an integral part of the Buddhist bureaucratic organization, which in turn referred to the Tokugawa.

The system had three tiers, with at the lowest the temple which issued the terauke. Local government officials would then collect all terauke, bind them in ledgers called shūmon ninbetsu aratamechō (宗門人別改帳) and submit them to higher authorities. The purpose was to force Christians to become affiliated to a Buddhist temple, while making the monitoring of suspected Christians easier.

The very first registries in existence are dated between 1638 and 1640 and, unsurprisingly, are found in areas where the Christian religion was strong, for example Kyoto, its province and Kyūshū. Registries in other areas are not found until the second half of the 17th century, but individual terauke, which clearly served the same purpose, are.

Because in 1664 the bakufu ordered to all daimyōs the establishment in their domain of an officer of religious investigation called magistrate of religion (宗門奉行, shūmon bugyō) or magistrate of temples and shrines (寺社奉行, jisha bugyō), from the following year registries of religious affiliation started being produced nationwide.

In 1671 the registry's format was standardized. The document had to record all peasant households, state the number of men and women of each town, plus the totals for all districts and the province. The intendant had to keep the registry and send a one-page summary to higher authorities. Further, all departures from the community due to marriage, work or death were to be recorded. This registry format was maintained unchanged until 1870, three years into the Meiji era. Since the order explicitly states that "Naturally, it is appropriate to investigate many things, and not only at the time of inquiry into religion", the system clearly had from the beginning purposes that went beyond religion. The result was an Edo equivalent of today's household registry, set apart only by the temple's obligation to specify a family temple and the citizens' to obtain a terauke. In some regions, the right to issue certificates was called shūhanken (宗判権), a right which gradually became a source of great power for the temples. Not only was a certificate issued after payment of a fee, but it gave religious authorities the power of life and death over parishioners.

This document had to be obtained every year after an inspection at one's temple of affiliation. Those who for some reason could not obtain a temple certification were recorded as hinin (non-persons) and thereafter subject to discrimination, or simply executed as Christians. Not only peasants, but even samurai and Shintō priests could not live or function within society without a terauke, which had assumed a role similar to that of identity papers now. It was necessary to marry, to travel, to gain access to certain jobs. After 1729 the breaking of ties between a temple and a danka (or ridan (離壇)) was formally outlawed, making the link between a danka and a temple impossible to break. This eliminated competition for parishioners between temples, giving a man and his family no possibility to change temple of affiliation. By the late 17th century the system had become an integral part of the Tokugawa state apparatus. It also contributed to the enforcement of Buddhist orthodoxy; the danka system was used to stamp out Ikkō-shū and other schools of Buddhism deemed "deviant" in the Tokugawa era.

== The appearance of the Gojōmoku ==
The life of the dankas were later made even more difficult by a document that greatly expanded a temple's powers over those affiliated to it. Purporting to be a bakufu law regulating in great detail the certification of religious affiliation process, it appeared around 1735 and had thereafter large circulation all over Japan. Dated 1613 and called "Individual Rules Concerning the Certification of Religious Affiliation for Danka" (御条目宗門旦那請合之掟, Gojōmoku Shūmon Danna Ukeai No Okite), usually abbreviated to just Gojōmoku), it is demonstrably a forgery, probably created by the temples themselves, whose interests it serves.

That the document is a fake is proven beyond doubt by the fact that it lists among the forbidden religions not only Christianity, but also the Fuju-fuse (不受不施) and Hiden (悲田) subschools of the Nichiren sect. Since the two schools were outlawed respectively in 1669 and 1691, the date of issue must have been deliberately misstated. The likely reason this particular date was chosen is that it is the year in which Tokugawa Ieyasu's "Order to Expel Christian Priests" (伴天連追放令, Bateren Tsuihōrei) was issued, and because the following year temples were ordered to start issuing terauke.

The document is often found in temples and collections all over the country and it appears to have been believed genuine even by most Meiji period historians. The Gojōmoku, which gives temples additional power over parishioners, is mentioned occasionally by temple registries and, when a danka did not meet its conditions, the temple certification was not issued. Its provisions caused considerable problems between danka and temples.

The document first defined four duties of the danka.

- Duty to visit the temple on several yearly occasion. Failure to make the visits could cause the removal of the danka's name from the registry.
- Duty to perform two services on the day of the ancestor memorial service. Failure to provide adequate entertainment for the priest meant being branded as a Christian.
- Duty to make the family temple perform all memorial and funerary services.
- Duty of anyone capable of walking to be present at memorial services for ancestors.

It then gave five rights to its temple.

- A danka had to perform certain acts in favor of the temple, including making offerings and providing free labor. Failure to do so meant being branded as a Fuju-fuse sect member.
- A danka had to obey its temple and give money to its priests.
- Regardless of how long a danka group had been faithful, it was always to be subject to religious investigation to determine the possible emergence of heresy.
- After someone's death, just looking at the corpse the priest could determine what the defunct's true religion had been.
- The danka was always to follow his temple's orders.

== Consequences of the danka system ==
The consequences of two centuries and a half of terauke use and of the bureaucratization of Buddhism were numerous and profound, first of all for Buddhism itself.

=== Structural distortions ===
The chasm between allowed and forbidden sects became much deeper than it had been. If on the one hand Buddhism allowed a diversification of its authorized sects, on the other it punished tendencies that put into question the political status quo. A danka was registered at the closest temple regardless of its religious affiliations, so these became gradually less important. As a consequence of all these factors, differences among sects allowed by the government became watered down and Buddhism became more uniform, not least because the Shogunate had a say in matters of religious orthodoxy.

During the Edo period, Buddhism therefore offered few new ideas (with the possible exception of the reform of Zen sects). On the contrary, the development during the same period of Japanese Confucianism and Shinto, and the birth of the so-called "New Religions" produced interesting ideas.

=== The advent of "funerary Buddhism" ===
Even though the original intent of Buddhism was the spreading of the teachings of Buddha, Buddhist temples in Japan today are primarily cemeteries. The so-called sōshiki bukkyō (葬式仏教) or Funerary Buddhism of today, lampooned for example in Juzo Itami's film The Funeral, where Japanese Buddhism's essential function has become confined to the performance of funerals and memorial services, is a direct consequence of the danka system, as is the sale of posthumous names (or kaimyō (戒名)). As far as Buddhism was concerned, the defining feature of the danka system during the Edo period was that it guaranteed a steady stream of profits thanks to the mandatory funerary rites. This cash flow is what paid for the majority of the temples in Japan and guaranteed their proliferation, and is inseparable from the danka system. Hence the tight association between Buddhism and death that continues to this day. When the formal dissolution of the whole danka system arrived after World War II, it meant for Buddhism a great loss of income, and therefore financial insecurity.

=== The Haibutsu kishaku movement ===
The use of terauke and the widespread resentment it created are considered to be one of the primary causes of the haibutsu kishaku, a violent and spontaneous movement that at the beginning of the Meiji era caused the destruction of a high number of temples all over Japan. The government's official policy of separation of Shinto and Buddhism (Shinbutsu bunri) of the time, while not directly responsible for this destruction, provided the trigger that released pent-up energy. Considering Buddhism's close association with the Tokugawa, it cannot be a surprise that Buddhist monks were regarded as state agents and that several sectors of the Edo society began trying to find alternate ways to satisfy their spiritual needs.

In spite of its history, Buddhism had however decisive advantages over both Shinto and Confucianism that during the Meiji era made it impossible to replace it with either. With its many rituals (the jūsan butsuji, or thirteen Buddhist rituals), Buddhism could better help people cope with death. Moreover, Shinto associates death with pollution, so it is intrinsically less suitable to funerary ceremonies, while Confucianism in Japan did not concern itself much with funerals. Lastly, Buddhism had a country-wide infrastructure that neither Shinto nor Confucianism could match.

== See also ==
- Religion in Japan
- Shrine Parishioner Registration

== Literature ==
- Marcure, Kenneth (Spring 1985). "The Danka System". Monumenta Nipponica. 40 (1). Tokyo: Sophia University: 39–67. doi:10.2307/2385001. JSTOR 2385001.
- Nam-Lin Hur, Death and social order in Tokugawa Japan: Buddhism, anti-Christianity, and the danka system, Harvard University Asia Center, 2007; pp. 1-30 (The Rise of Funerary Buddhism in Tokugawa Japan). Internet archive
- Bernhard Scheid, Inquisition unter buddhistischen Vorzeichen (in German) retrieved on March 20, 2008
- Paul B. Watt, Review of "Nam-Lin Hur, Death and Social Order in Tokugawa Japan: Buddhism, Anti-Christianity, and the Danka System" retrieved on March 20, 2008
- Tamura, Yoshiro (2000). "The Birth of the Japanese nation". Japanese Buddhism – A Cultural History (First ed.). Tokyo: Kosei Publishing Company. pp. 232 pages. ISBN 4-333-01684-3.
- Review of "Death and Social Order in Tokugawa Japan: Buddhism, anti-Christianity and the Danka System" by Nam-Lin Hur By Steven Heine, retrieved on October 20, 2008

== Bibliography ==
- Tamamuro Fumio (2001), "Local Society and the Temple-Parishioner Relationship within the Bakufu’s Governance Structure", Japanese Journal of Religious Studies 28/3-4, 261–29
- Tamamuro Fumio (2009), The Development of the Temple-Parishioner System, Japanese Journal of Religious Studies 36/1, 11–26
