= Bettō =

Bettō (別当) is a term which originally indicated the head of an institution serving temporarily as the head of another one, but which came to mean also the full-time head of some institution. The Kamakura period samurai Wada Yoshimori, for example, was the first bettō of the shogunate's Samurai-dokoro.

== Religious use of the term ==
A bettō was a monk who performed Buddhist rites at shrines and jingūji (shrines part of a temple) before the shinbutsu bunri, the Meiji period law that forbade the mixing of Shinto and Buddhism. A shrine had various bettō, from the seibettō (head monk) to the shūri bettō (monk in charge of repairs). Those not associated with religious duties were called zoku bettō. Among the shrines that appointed bettō are Iwashimizu Hachiman-gū, Tsurugaoka Hachiman-gū, and Hakone Jinja. They were particularly common at Hachiman and gongen shrines, and their mandate lasted three or six years.

== See also ==
- Bettoji Temple
