= Shinbutsu kakuri =

Practice of keeping kami separate from Buddhism

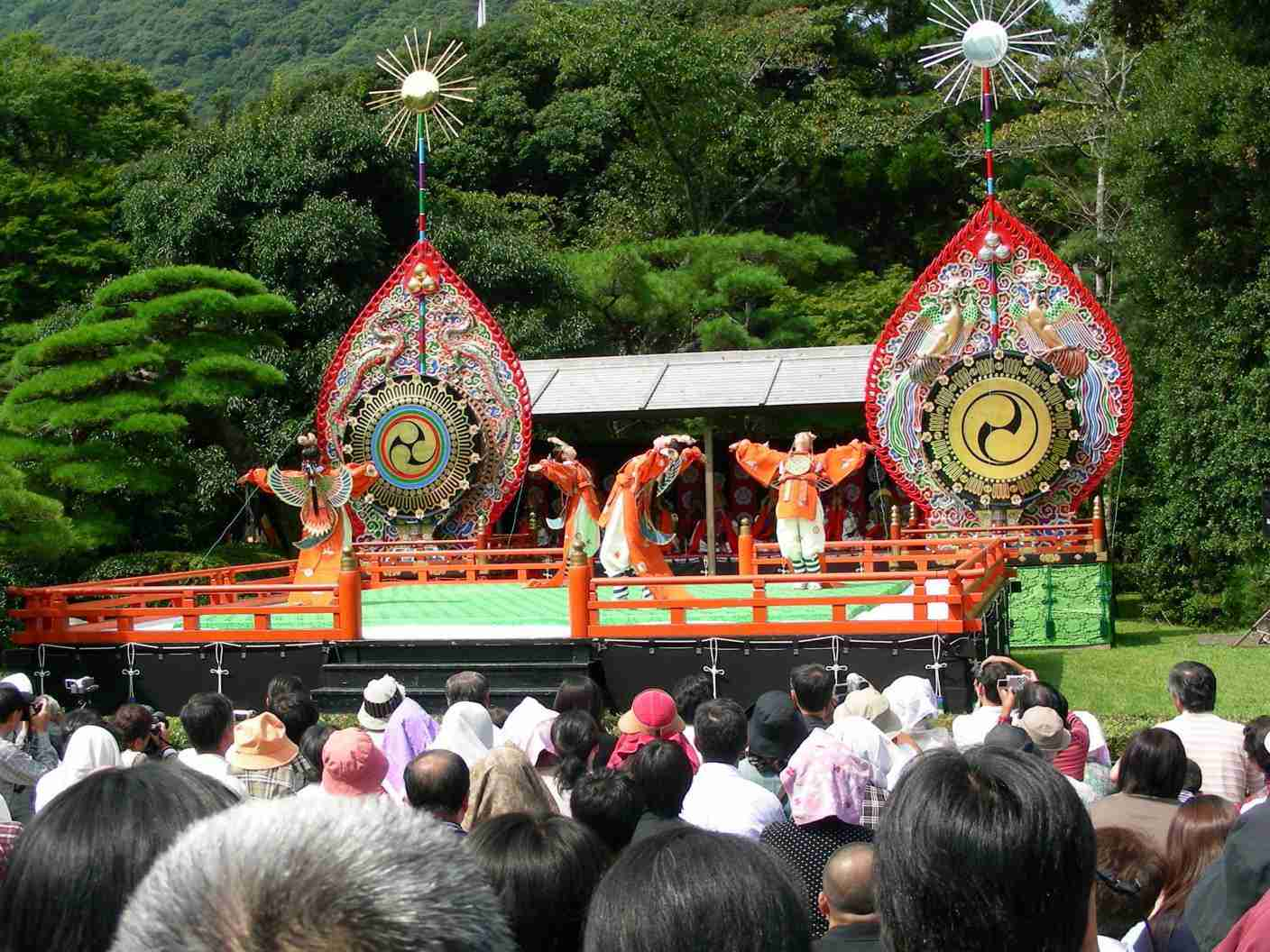
Ise Shrine was one of the first to isolate its kami from Buddhism.

The term shinbutsu kakuri (神仏隔離, isolation of kami from Buddhism) in Japanese Buddhist terminogy refers to the tendency in medieval and early modern Japan to keep some kami separate from Buddhism. While some kami were integrated in Buddhism, others (or at times even the same kami in a different context) were kept systematically away from Buddhism. This phenomenon had significant consequences for Japanese culture as a whole. It should not be confused with shinbutsu bunri ("separation of kami and buddhas") or with haibutsu kishaku ("abolish Buddhas and destroy Shākyamuni"), which are phenomenons recurrent in Japanese history and usually due to political causes. While the first assumes the acceptance of Buddhism, the second and third actually oppose it.

== History ==
When foreign Buddhism arrived in Japan it became necessary to harmonize it with local kami beliefs. This was done in a number of ways, among them shinbutsu shūgō, or "syncretism of kami and buddhas", and its opposite, shinbutsu kakuri.

=== Fusion of kami and buddhas ===
After Buddhism arrived in Japan, the Japanese developed a syncretism of local kami beliefs and foreign Buddhism called shinbutsu shūgō. When Buddhism was introduced through China in the late Asuka period (6th century), rather than discard the old belief system the Japanese tried to reconcile it with the new, assuming both were true. As a consequence, Buddhist temples were attached to local Shinto shrines and vice versa; both were devoted to both kami and Buddha. The depth of the resulting influence of Buddhism on the local religion can be seen for example in the fact that the type of shrine we see today, with a large worship hall and images, is itself of Buddhist origin. The influential honji suijaku (本地垂迹) theory, common in Japan until the Meiji period, even states that Buddhist gods choose to appear to the Japanese as native kami in order to save them.

=== Resistance to shinbutsu shūgō ===
While in popular practice kami and buddhas were both mixed and combined in a "common religion", they were at the same time isolated and separated in various ways elsewhere. The two religions never fused completely and, while overlapping here and there, kept their particular identity inside a difficult, largely unsystematized and tense relationship. This relationship was, rather than between two systems, between particular kami and particular buddhas. The two were always perceived as parallel but separate entities. Besides shinbutsu shugo there was always the other side of the coin, the shinbutsu kakuri. For example, at Iwashimizu Hachiman-gū some rites were kami rites, other were Buddhist, and were therefore conducted by different people. There was in the Japanese a strong resistance to the complete assimilation of their kami with foreign gods.

This visible resistance to Buddhism can be traced all the way back to the Nihon shoki's sixth-century account of the first introduction of Buddhism to Japan. Later history is dotted with accounts of friction between some kami and Buddhist temples that lie in their territories.

At Ise Jingū, for example, the Ise Daijingūji (伊勢大神宮寺) shrine-temple was moved twice because of the incessant rain caused by the kami angered by its excessive proximity to the shrines. An 804 book, the Kōtaijingū Gishikichō (皇太神宮儀式帳), stipulates that on Ise lands some Buddhist words (buddha, sūtra, gojūnotō, monk, temple or vegetarian food) cannot be uttered and must be replaced with others. The book even specifies these replacement words (imikotoba (忌み言葉)) to be used instead of proscribed ones: nakago ("middle child") for a buddha, kawarabuki ("tile-roofed building") for "temple," and somegami ("stained paper") for sūtra.

There was therefore a conscious desire to keep the kami away from Buddhism. Toward the end of the ninth century the practice spread to other shrines. The Jōgan shiki (871) prohibits all Buddhist rites at court offices and at all province offices during the imperial enthronement period, or daijōe (大嘗会). Also, monks and nuns couldn't enter the imperial palace during the abstinence before, during and after some kami rituals at court. The Engi shiki says that, in some periods of the year, monks and nuns may not enter the imperial palace. In the Heian period this kind of separation became a common practice with many well-attested practical consequences. This taboo was rigorously observed at the imperial palace for centuries. It not only lasted, but gained new force during the Edo period under the Tokugawa. Buddhism was proscribed only insofar as the emperor was concerned and during the periods prescribed by the rites, but otherwise the usual mixing of kami and buddhas would take place.

=== Origins of the shinbutsu kakuri ===
The precise origin of the phenomenon does not appear to be related to the Buddhist special relationship with death. Direct contact with death was forbidden in temples too, and Buddhism was not outlawed at most shrines. Shinbutsu kakuri originated within rituals and shrines like Ise Jingū which had profound ties with the emperor, and always remained strictly tied to him and to the ceremony of his enthronement. It later spread to other official ceremonies. It has been argued that it was a reaction against Buddhist political interference that peaked with the Dōkyō incident of 768 in which Empress Shōtoku wanted to give the throne to monk Dōkyō. It seems therefore that imperial ritual was isolated from Buddhism to protect the principle of hereditary imperial rule.

The practice had in any case important consequences, among them the prevention of the complete assimilation of kami practices into Buddhism. Also, the prohibition of Buddhism at the Ise and Kamo Shrines allowed them to freely develop their theories about the nature of kami.
