= Mark Teeuwen =

Dutch Japanologist

Mark J. Teeuwen (Marcus Jacobus Teeuwen, born 9 February 1966, Eindhoven) is a Dutch academic and Japanologist. He is an expert in Japanese religious practices, and he is a professor at the University of Oslo. In a 2002 essay called From Jindō to Shinto: A Concept Takes Shape, he traced the evolution of the term "Shinto" from the reconstructed pronunciation Jindō at the time of the Nihon Shoki until today, describing the changes its meaning has gone through.

== Early life ==
Teeuwen was awarded his MA at the University of Leiden in 1989. His earned a Ph.D. at Leiden in 1996.

== Career ==
From 1994 through 1999, Teeuwen was a lecturer at the Japanese Studies Centre, University of Wales in Cardiff. Since 1999, he has been Professor of Japanese at the University of Oslo.

Teeuwen's critical examination of religious practices in Japan is considered ground-breaking. His published work has been informed by his historical research. Historicity is construed as a fundamental component of Teeuwen's view of Shinto.

Teeuwen's work is influenced by the writings of Toshio Kuroda.

== Selected works ==
In a statistical overview derived from writings by and about Mark Teeuwen, OCLC/WorldCat encompasses roughly 20 works in 60+ publications in 5 languages and 2,000+ library holdings .

- Watarai Shintô: an Intellectual History of the Outer Shrine in Ise (1996)
- Nakatomi Harae Kunge: Purification and Enlightenment in Late-Heian Japan (1998)
- Shinto in History: Ways of the Kami (1999), with John Breen
- Buddhas and Kami in Japan 'honji suijaku' as a Combinatory Paradigm (2002)
- Tracing Shinto in the History of Kami Worship (2002), with Bernhard Scheid
- Buddhas and Kami in Japan: Honji Suijaku as a Combinatory Paradigm (2002)
- Tracing Shinto in the History of Kami Worship (2002)
- Shinto, a Short History (2003)
- Buddhas and Kami in Japan: Honji Suijaku as Combinatory Paradigm (2003), with Fabio Rambelli
- Shinto: een geschiedenis van Japanse goden en heiligdommen (2004)
- The Culture of Secrecy in Japanese Religion (2006)
- A New History of Shinto (2010), with John Breen
- Kyoto's Gion Festival: A Social History (2023)

Articles

- "Comparative perspectives on the emergence of jindō and Shinto," Bulletin of SOAS, Vol. 70, No. 2, 2007, pp. 373–402.
- "Kokugaku vs. Nativism," Monumenta Nipponica 61–2, Summer 2006, pp. 227–24.

== See also ==
- Honji suijaku
