= Nichiō =

Japanese Nichiren Buddhist monk

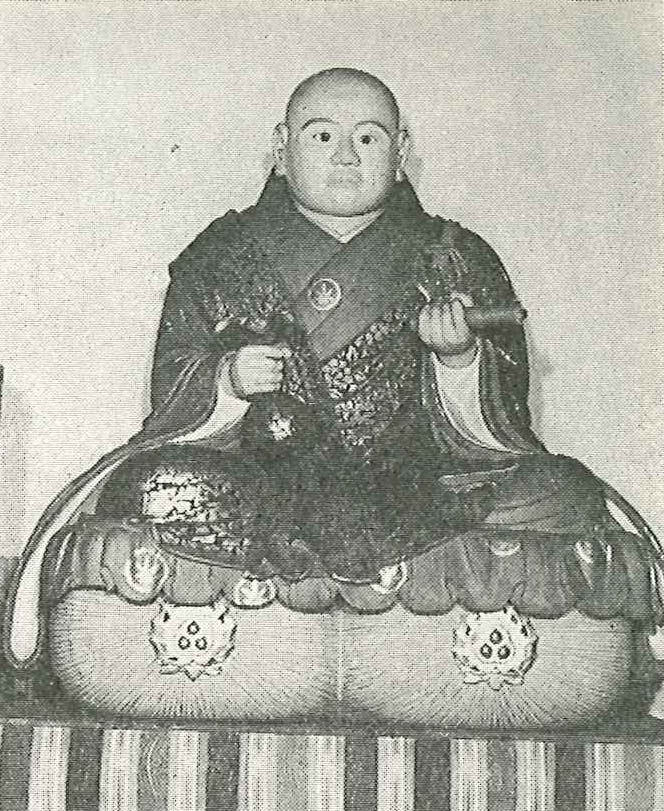
Nichiou in picture

Nichiō (日奥, 1565–1630) was a Nichiren Buddhist who founded the Fuju-fuse subsect. His sect was founded when he refused to attend funeral services for Hideyoshi. The regent Tokugawa Ieyasu subsequently exiled him to Tsushima.
