= Shinbutsu-shūgō =

Japanese syncretism of Shinto and Buddhism

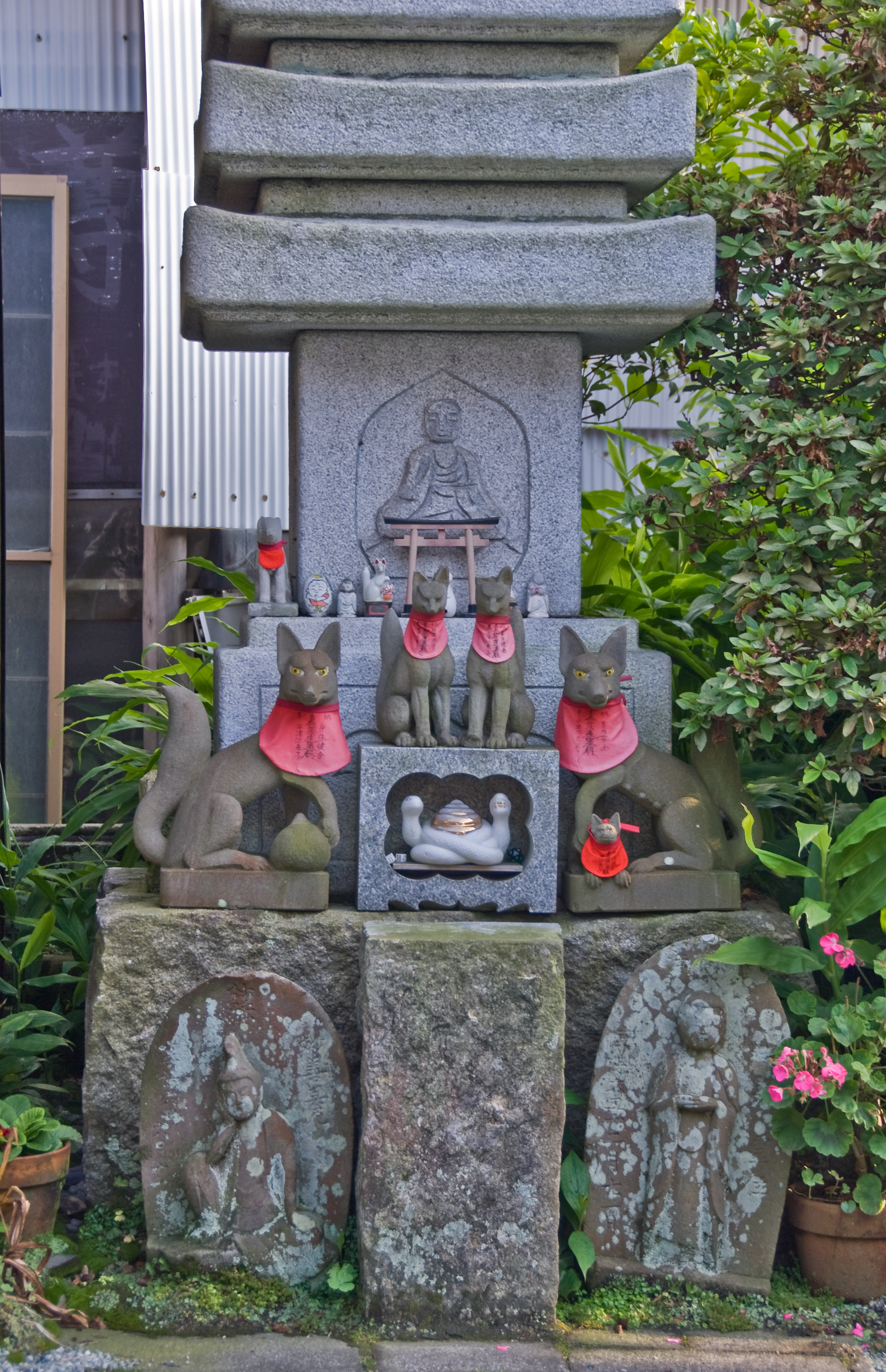
Foxes sacred to Shinto kami Inari, a torii, a Buddhist stone pagoda, and Buddhist figures together at Jōgyō-ji, Kamakura

Shinbutsu-shūgō (神仏習合, "syncretism of kami and buddhas"), a.k.a. the Shinbutsu-konkō (神仏混淆, "jumbling up" or "contamination of kami and buddhas"), is the syncretism of Shinto and Buddhism that was Japan's primary organized religion up until the Meiji restoration. Beginning in 1868, the new Meiji government approved a series of laws that separated Japanese native kami worship, on one side, from Buddhism which had assimilated it, on the other.

When Buddhism was introduced from China in the Asuka period (6th century), the Japanese tried to reconcile the new beliefs with the older Shinto beliefs, assuming both were true. As a consequence, Buddhist temples (寺, tera) were attached to local Shinto shrines (神社, jinja) and vice versa and devoted to both kami and Buddhist figures. The local religion and foreign Buddhism never fused into a single, unified religion, but remained inextricably linked to the present day through interaction. The depth of the influence from Buddhism on local religious beliefs can be seen in much of Shinto's conceptual vocabulary and even the types of Shinto shrines seen today. The large worship halls and religious images are themselves of Buddhist origin. The formal separation of Buddhism from Shinto took place only as recently as the end of the 19th century; however, in many ways, the blending of the two still continues.

The term shinbutsu shūgō itself was coined during the early modern era (17th century) to refer to the amalgamation of kami and buddhas in general, as opposed to specific currents within Buddhism which did the same, e.g. Ryōbu Shintō and Sannō Shintō. The term may have a negative connotation of bastardization and randomness. It is a yojijukugo phrase.

== Assimilation of Buddhism ==
=== Debate over the nature of Shinto ===
There is no agreement among specialists as to the exact extent of fusion between the two religions.

According to some scholars (such as Hirai Naofusa in Japan and Joseph Kitagawa in the US), Shinto is the indigenous religion of Japan, has existed as such continuously since its prehistory, and consists of all the uniquely Japanese rituals and beliefs shaped by Japanese history from prehistory to the present. The term "Shinto" itself was coined in the 6th century to differentiate the previously disparate local religious practices from imported Buddhism.

The opposing view of Japanese historian Toshio Kuroda and his supporters is that Shinto as an independent religion was born only in the modern period after emerging in the Middle Ages as an offshoot of Buddhism, and that Shinto as a distinct religion is a Meiji era invention of Japanese nationalist ideologues. Kuroda points out how the state formalization of kami rituals and the state ranking of shrines during the Heian period were not the emergence of Shinto as an independent religion, but an effort to explain local beliefs in Buddhist terms. He also says that, while it is true that the two characters for "Shinto" appear very early in the historical record (for example in the Nihon Shoki), this does not mean today's Shinto already existed as a religion because the same word was originally used for Taoism or even for religion in general. Indeed, according to Kuroda, many features of Shinto (for example the worshiping of mirrors and swords or the very structure of the Ise Grand Shrine, Shinto's holiest and most important site) are typical of Taoism. The term "Shinto" in old texts, therefore, does not necessarily indicate something uniquely Japanese.

Still, according to this view, Shinto's rise as an autonomous religion was gradual and started to become evident with the emergence of Yoshida Kanetomo's sect, Yoshida Shintō. The term Shinto started to be used with today's meaning of kami worship only later during the Edo period. During the same era, Kokugaku theorists like Motoori Norinaga tried to separate it intellectually from Buddhism, preparing the ground for the final schism of the Meiji Restoration.

According to the first view, then, the two religions were at the time of their first meeting already formed and independent and thereafter just coexisted with non-essential exchanges. According to the second, Buddhism, meeting local kami beliefs in Japan, actually produced today's Shinto.

=== Assimilation process ===
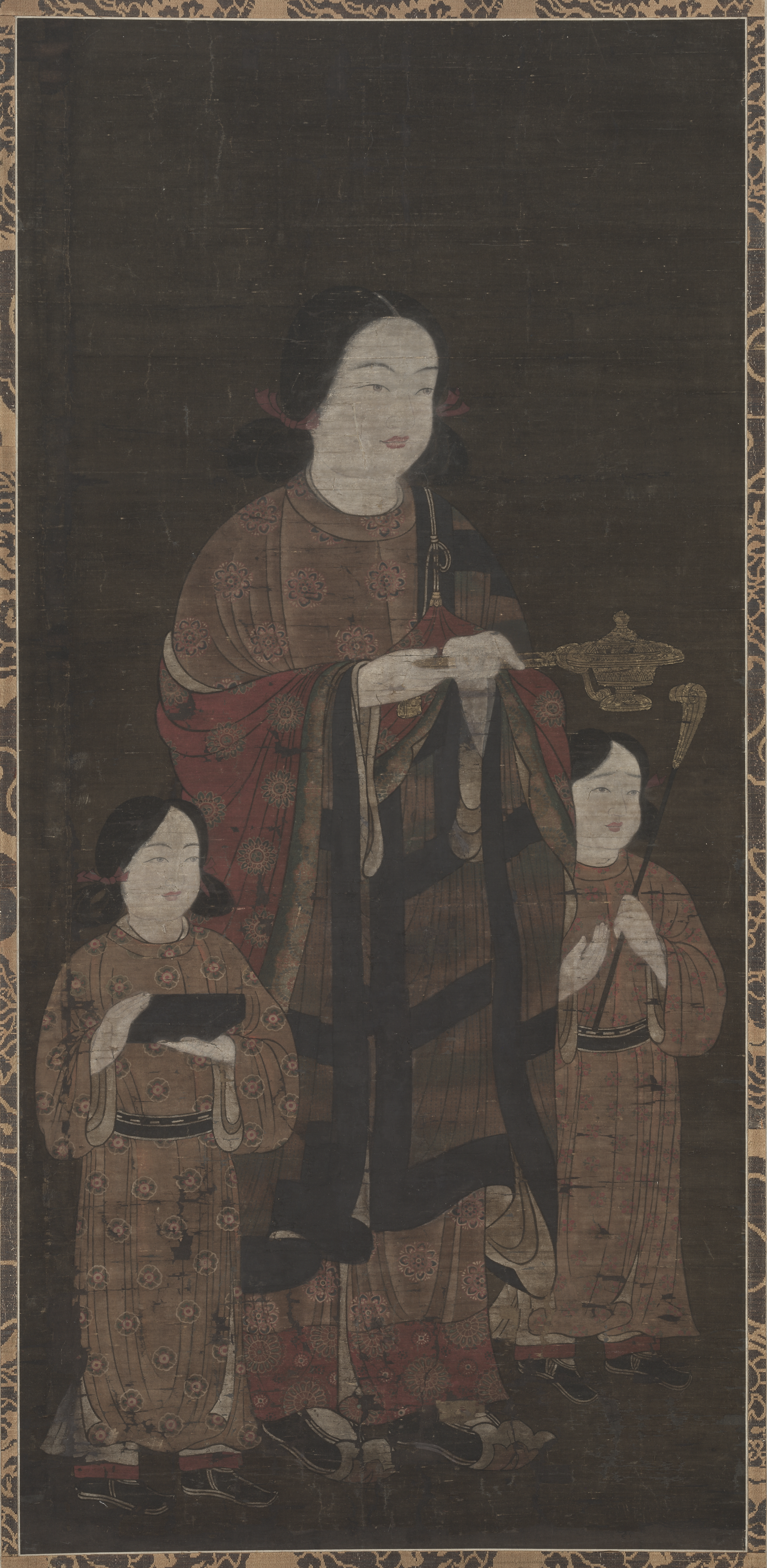
Prince Shōtoku, an early proponent of Buddhism and instrumental in the defeat of the Mononobe Clan

The fusion of Buddhism with local kami worship began as soon as the first Buddhist arrived. Mononobe no Okoshi wrote, "The kami of our land will be offended if we worship a foreign kami." Mononobe saw the Buddha as just another kami.

Foreign kami were called banshin (蕃神, "barbarian gods") or "Buddhist gods" (仏神, busshin), and understood to be more or less like local ones. Initially, therefore, the conflict between the two religions was not religious, rather a political struggle between the progressive Soga clan, which wanted a more international outlook for the country, and the conservative Mononobe clan, which wanted the contrary.

Buddhism was not passive in the assimilation process, but was itself ready to assimilate and be assimilated. By the time it entered Japan, it was already syncretic, having adapted to and amalgamated with other religions and cultures in India, China, and the Korean Peninsula. For example, already while in India, it had absorbed Hindu divinities like Brahma (Bonten in Japanese) and Indra (Taishakuten). When it arrived in Japan, it already had a disposition towards producing the combinatory gods that the Japanese would call syncretic deities (習合神, shūgōshin). Searching for the origins of a kami in Buddhist scriptures was felt to be nothing out of the ordinary.

However, if monks did not doubt the existence of kami, they certainly saw them as inferior to their buddhas. Hindu gods had already been treated analogously: they had been thought of as unenlightened and prisoners of saṃsāra. Buddhist claims of superiority encountered resistance, and monks tried to overcome them by deliberately integrating kami into their belief system. Several strategies to do this were developed and deployed.

The process of amalgamation is usually divided into three stages.

The first articulation of the difference between Japanese religious ideas and Buddhism, and the first effort to reconcile the two is attributed to Prince Shōtoku (574–622), and the first signs that the differences between the two world views were beginning to become manifest to the Japanese in general appear at the time of Emperor Tenmu (673–686). Accordingly, one of the first efforts to reconcile Shinto and Buddhism was made in the 8th century during the Nara period founding so-called jingū-ji (神宮寺), that is shrine-temples, complexes comprising both a shrine and a temple.

Behind the inclusion in a Shinto shrine of Buddhist religious objects was the idea that the kami were lost beings in need of liberation through Buddhism like any other sentient beings. Kami were thought to be subject to karma and reincarnation like human beings, and early Buddhist stories tell how the task of helping suffering kami was assumed by wandering monks. A local kami would appear in a dream to the monk, telling him about his suffering.

To improve the kami's karma through rites and the recitation of sutras, Buddhist monks would build Buddhist temples next to kami shrines. Such groupings had been created by the 7th century, for example at Usa Jingū in Kyūshū, where Hachiman was worshiped together with Maitreya.

The building of temples at shrines produced jingū-ji complexes, which in turn accelerated the amalgamation process. As a result of the creation of shrine-temple complexes, many shrines that had until then been just an open-air site became Buddhist-style groupings of buildings.

At the end of the same century, in what is considered the second stage of the amalgamation, Hachiman was declared a dharmapala and, later, a bodhisattva. Chinjusha (temple shrines) in his honor began to be built in temples, marking an important step ahead in the process of amalgamation of kami and Buddhism. When the great buddha at Tōdai-ji in Nara was built, there was also erected within the temple grounds a shrine for Hachiman – according to the legend because of a wish expressed by the kami himself. Hachiman considered this his reward for having helped the temple find the gold and copper mines from which the metal for the great statue had come. After this, temples in the entire country adopted chinjugami 'tutelary kami'.

=== Honji suijaku theory ===
The third and final stage of the fusion took place in the 9th century with the development of the honji suijaku (本地垂迹) theory according to which Japanese kami are emanations of buddhas, bodhisattvas or devas who mingle with human beings to lead them to the Buddhist Way. This theory was the keystone of the whole shinbutsu shūgō edifice and therefore the foundation of Japanese religion for many centuries. Because of it, most kami changed from potentially dangerous spirits to be improved through contact with the Buddhist law to local emanations of buddhas and bodhisattvas which possess wisdom of their own. Buddhas and kami were now indivisible twins.

The status of kami however changed dramatically according to the sect. At one extreme one was Shingon Buddhism's Ryōbu Shintō thinkers, who considered kami and buddhas equivalent in power and dignity. However, not all kami were emanations of some buddha. Some, often called jitsu no kami (実神, true kami), usually dangerous and angry, had no Buddhist counterpart. Among them were the tengu, or animals possessing magic, as the red fox (kitsune) or Japanese raccoon dog (狸, tanuki). Even these unholy and inferior "true kami" however attracted the attention of Ryōbu Shinto thinkers, which resulted in theories which declared them to be manifestations of Vairocana and Amaterasu.

On the other hand, Jōdo Shinshū, the primary Pure Land sect in Japan, was somewhat different because it at first renounced kami-worship due to the notion that kami were inferior to the buddhas. However, the two other Pure Land schools of Jōdo-shū and Ji-shu still encouraged the worship of kami despite the fact that the nembutsu and trust in Amida Buddha should be the primary practices. Furthermore, under the influence of Rennyo and other leaders, Jōdo Shinshū would later accept the mainstream honji suijaku beliefs and the spiritual relationship between kami and the buddhas and bodhisattvas.

=== Shinbutsu kakuri ===
The two religions however never fused completely and, while overlapping here and there, kept their particular identity within a difficult, largely un-systematized and tense relationship. This relationship existed, rather than between two systems, between particular kami and particular buddhas. The two were always perceived as parallel but separate entities. Besides shinbutsu shūgō there was always the other side of the coin of continued separation.

In fact, the term shinbutsu kakuri (神仏隔離, isolation of "kami" from Buddhism) in Japanese Buddhist terminology refers to the tendency that existed in Japan to keep some kami separate from Buddhism. While some kami were integrated into Buddhism, others (or at times, even the same kami in a different context) were kept systematically away from Buddhism. This phenomenon had significant consequences for Japanese culture as a whole. It must not be confused with shinbutsu bunri ("separation of kami and buddhas") or with haibutsu kishaku ("abolish buddhas and destroy Shākyamuni"), which are phenomena recurrent in Japanese history and usually due to political causes. While the first assumes the acceptance of Buddhism, the second and third actually oppose it.

The practice had in any case important consequences, among them the prevention of the complete assimilation of kami practices into Buddhism. Also, the prohibition of Buddhism at the Ise and Kamo Shrines allowed them to freely develop their theories about the nature of kami.

== Buddhism and Shinto after the Separation Order ==
During the Shinbutsu bunri, the attempt to separate Shinto from Buddhism, temples, and shrines were forcefully separated by law with the "Kami and Buddhism Separation Order" (神仏判然令, Shinbutsu Hanzenrei) of 1868.

However, despite more than a century of formal separation of the two religions, temples or shrines that do not separate them are still common, as proven for example by the existence of some important Buddhist Inari shrines. During the Meiji period, in order to help the spread of Shinto, shrines with temples (jingū-ji) were destroyed while temples with shrines (chinjusha) were tolerated. As a result, shrines with temples within them are now rare (an extant example is Seiganto-ji), but shrines contained within temples are common, and most temples still have at least a small one.

Prominent religious institutions in both camps still give evidence of integration of the two religions. The great Kenchō-ji temple, number one of the Kamakura's great Zen temples (the Five Mountain System) includes two shrines. One of the islands in the right-side pond of Tsurugaoka Hachimangū in Kamakura hosts a sub shrine dedicated to goddess Benzaiten, a form of Saraswati. For this reason, the sub-shrine was removed in 1868 at the time of the Shinbutsu Bunri, but rebuilt in 1956.

Shinto and Buddhism still have a symbiotic relationship of interdependence, particularly concerning funeral rites (entrusted to Buddhism) and weddings (usually left to Shinto or sometimes Christianity). The separation of the two religions is therefore considered only superficial, and shinbutsu shūgō is still an accepted practice.

Still, the separation of the two religions is felt to be real by the public. Scholar Karen Smyers comments, "The surprise of many of my informants regarding the existence of Buddhist Inari temples shows the success of the government's attempt to create separate conceptual categories regarding sites and certain identities, although practice remains multiple and nonexclusive".

== See also ==
- Confucian Shinto
- Haibutsu kishaku
- Shinbutsu bunri
- Shinbutsu kakuri
- Three teachings
- Chinese folk religion
