= John Breen (scholar) =

British academic

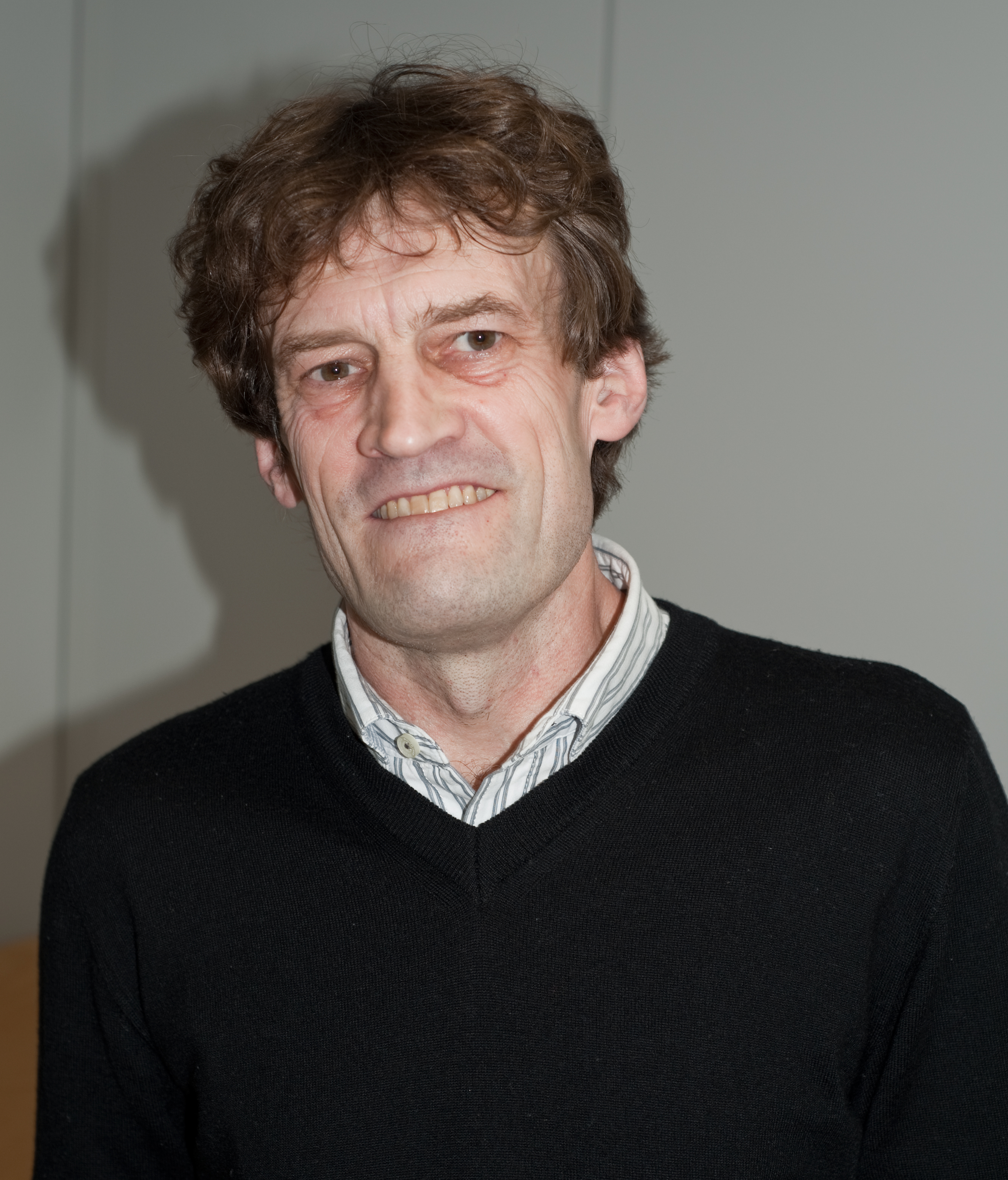
John Breen at a conference in Tokyo, February 2011

John Lawrence Breen (born 3 March 1956) is a British academic and Japanologist. He is a specialist in Japanese history at the International Research Center for Japanese Studies (国際日本文化研究センター, Nichibunken) in Kyoto. He writes in English and Japanese on the history of Shinto and the imperial institution.

== Early life ==
Breen was awarded his BA at St John's College, Cambridge in 1979. He earned a Ph.D. in 1993 at Cambridge.

== Career ==
From 1985 through 2008, Breen was a Lecturer, Senior Lecturer and Reader in Japanese at the School of Oriental and African Studies in London. He is currently Professor at the International Research Centre for Japanese Studies. He is also Editor-in-Chief of the peer-reviewed journal Japan Review.

Breen's critical examination of religious practices in Japan has been informed by his historical research. Historicity is construed as a fundamental component of Breen's view of Shinto.

Breen's work on Shinto is influenced by the writings of Toshio Kuroda. As most contemporary historians, he holds a more moderate position. While Kuroda denied Shinto was more than a japanized version of Buddhism, Breen and Teeuwen argue there was a pre-modern, indigenous tradition of worship, mythology and shrines, even if indeed Shinto as an organized religion was yet to be born.

Breen has also written articles in English and Japanese and a book in Japanese on the transformation of the imperial institution in the 19th century.

== Selected works ==
In a statistical overview derived from writings by and about John Breen, OCLC/WorldCat encompasses roughly 10+ works in 30 publications in 1 language and 1,000+ library holding.

Books

- Japanese simplified (1987)
- Japan and Christianity: Impacts and Responses (1996) (edited with Mark Williams)
- Japanese in Three Months (1997)
- Shinto in History: Ways of the kami (2000) (edited with Mark Teeuwen)
- Inoue Nobutaka et al., Shintō: a short history (2002) (co-translated and adapted with Mark Teeuwen)
- Yasukuni, the War Dead and the Struggle for Japan's Past (2008) (edited)
- A New History of Shinto (2010) (co-authored with Mark Teeuwen)
- "Girei to kenryoku: tennno no Meiji ishin" (2010)

Book chapters (recent chapters in English only)

- “Popes, bishops, and war criminals: reflections on Catholics and Yasukuni in post-war Japan,” in Michael Bathgate ed., Course Reader 10: “Religion in modern Asia: Tradition, state and society,” The Asia Pacific Journal; Japan Focus
- “The nation’s shrine: conflict and commemoration at Yasukuni, modern Japan’s shrine to the war dead,” in Tsang, Rachel and Eric Taylor Woods eds. The cultural politics of nationalism and nation-building: ritual and performance in the forging of nations" (2014)
- “Yasukuni shrine: ritual and memory,” in Sven Saaler & Justin Aukema eds., Course Reader 7: “The Politics of Memory in Japan and East Asia,” The Asia Pacific Journal; Japan Focus (2013)
- “’Fine words indeed’: Yasukuni and the narrative fetishism of war,” Inken Prohl and John Nelson eds., Handbook of contemporary Japanese religions (2012)
- “Shinto,” in Helmut Anheier, Mark Jurgensmeyer ed., Encyclopedia of Global Studies (2012)
- “Voices of rage: six paths to the problem of Yasukuni,” in Roy Starrs ed., Politics and religion in modern Japan: red sun, white lotus (2012)
- “Mourning and violence in the Land of Peace: Reflections on Yasukuni,” in Breen and Yamada eds. Understanding contemporary Japan (2011)

Articles (recent articles in English only)

- “Resurrecting the sacred land of Japan: the state of Shinto in the 21st century,” Japanese Journal of Religious Studies, 37, 2 (2010)
- “’Shinto is the great way of the universe’: historical notes on Shinto-Christian negotiations,” Japan Mission Journal, 63, 4 (2009)
- “’The danger is ever present’: Catholic critiques of Yasukuni shrine in post-war Japan,’ Japan Mission Journal, 63, 2 (2009)
