= Fuju-fuse =

Subsect of Nichiren Buddhism

The Nichiren Fuju-fuse-ha (不受不施派) was a subsect of the Buddhist Nichiren sect founded by Buddhist priest Nichiō (日奥) and outlawed in 1669. Although ferociously persecuted for over two centuries for refusing obedience to authorities, it survived and was again legalized in 1876. Later, the subsect itself split in two over a theological question. The two splinters are Okayama's Fuju-fuse Nichiren Kōmon-shū (不受不施日蓮講門宗) and Nichirenshū Fuju-fuse-ha (日蓮宗不受不施派).

Its name refers to Fuju-fuse-gi (不受不施義), a dogma allegedly by Nichiren himself that stated that nothing could be received (不受, Fuju) or given (不施, Fuse) to those of other religions, and that it was wrong to even sit with a priest of another sect. The Fuju-fuse-ha alleged to be the only subsect to follow Fuju-fuse-gi to the letter. The other subsects of Nichiren-shu, however, argued that the Niike Gosho where the term Fuju-fuse-gi appears was a forgery.

== Origins of the Fuju-fuse subsect ==
Nichiren, regarded as the founder of Nichiren Buddhism, believed in the supremacy of religious doctrine over temporal power and often tried to convert and challenged those in power, thereby attracting persecution over himself and his followers In his view, the only approach to those who didn't follow the Lotus Sutra was the so-called shakubuku (折伏), or "break and subdue". After his death, his disciples shared his views and acted accordingly, so the sect has had a long history of clashes with temporal powers. For example, in 1398 priests Nichinin and Nichijitsu of Myōman-ji in Kyoto rebuked shōgun Ashikaga Yoshimochi, who had them arrested and tortured. Later, priest Nisshin was also tortured by shōgun Ashikaga Yoshinori for not submitting to his authority. Two hundred years later, in 1608, in a famous incident Nichiren priest Nichikyō angered Tokugawa Ieyasu refusing to obey him, and had his ears and nose cut off.

With the consolidation of the Tokugawa shogunate, pressure on the recalcitrant Nichiren sect to conform increased, and most of its adherents compromised or capitulated. The exception were those who would in turn become the Fuju-fuse subsect, whose persecution begun with an incident at Toyotomi Hideyoshi's "Thousand-priest Ceremony" (千僧供養) for the dedication of the Daibutsu-den at Hōkō-ji in 1595. Priests of all sects were invited, and the Nichiren sect decided to attend too in spite of the Fuju-fuse-gi. Only Nichiō, chief priest at Myōkaku-ji in Kyoto, decided not to go citing Nichiren's intimation not to receive anything from non-believers. He also sent Hideyoshi a tract called "Rebuke from the Lotus Sect" demanding the ceremony's cancellation, then left at night to shield those around him from the consequences of his act.

His actions split the Nichiren sect in two, with those who thought it admissible to receive from nonbelievers, but not give, on one side, and the Fuju-fuse subsect irreducibles on the other. Nichiō's intransigence attracted the ire of those who had compromised, who denounced him to Ieyasu, and in 1599 the priest was exiled to Tsushima Island. He was pardoned in 1612, but friction between the two sides resumed. He was exiled to Tsushima once more in 1620, but died before the sentence could be carried out.

The Fuju-fuse movement gathered gradually momentum, provoking a strong reaction from the shogunate. The state demanded that Fuju-fuse temples issue receipts for state resources (land, water, roads, and the like) they were using, to make them admit that they were receiving from non-believers in an effort to break their determination. If they failed to produce the receipts, Fuju-fuse priests would not any longer be allowed to issue a terauke certificate to their parishioners, who would therefore legally become hinin ("non persons"). They themselves would be exiled. Some Fuju-fuse priests tried to leave their temple and preach in the streets, but that was also forbidden.

== The persecution ==
The movement was outlawed altogether in 1669. The movement responded to the new rules in different ways: most members went underground, some moved to a more accommodating branch of the Nichiren sect, and a few chose to live as outlaws, hiding and holding services at night. During the Edo period many were arrested, exiled or sentenced to death together with their families. For example, in 1668 priest Nikkan was arrested with five followers and their families for a total of 34 persons, including children. Nikkan and the followers were beheaded, the rest, including women and children, were exiled. In 1691 63 priests and 11 believers were sent to the islands of Miyake-jima, Ōshima, Kōzu-shima, Nii-jima and Hachijō-jima, where traces of their sojourn can still be seen.

In the 19th century the shogunate weakened and became as a consequence even more paranoid and repressive. In the Tenpō era (1830/44), repression was so severe that the subsect was practically wiped out. The few survivors even started using code numbers to indicate members and gathering places, but not even this helped, and the persecution continued until after the Meiji period. The sect was finally legalized in 1876 with the name Nichirenshū Fuju-fuse-ha.

== The sect's two splinters ==
Under the pressure of persecution in order to survive, the sect went underground and, while some members worshiped overtly, others pretended to belong to an allowed sect and worshiped in secret. However, many faithful thought it unfair to give equal status to those who lived the life of a fugitive and risked their lives for their faith (the hōryū (法立) and those who hid it pretending to belong to another sect (the naishinsha (内信者). They also thought it was morally wrong to let a naishinsha officiate instead of a real monk even under the circumstances—similar to the Donatist controversy in early Christianity. Officiating requires a pure heart and a pure body, the argument went, but a naishinsha's body is soiled by his deceiving appearances. The dissent spread to the entire movement, with those who wanted a clear distinction between the two types of faithful being called tsuderaha (津寺派) or (more formally) fudōshiha (不導師派), and the others being called hisashiha (日指派) or dōshiha (導師派). The division hardened and survived to the present day, with the fudōshiha being represented by the Fuju-fuse Nichiren Kōmon-shū (不受不施日蓮講門宗) which has its head temple in Okayama's Honkaku-ji, and the dōshiha by the Nichirenshū Fuju-fuse-ha (日蓮宗不受不施派), which has its head temple in Okayama's Myōkaku-ji.
