= Toshio Kuroda (Shinto professor) =

Japanese academic, historian and university professor (1926–1993)

Toshio Kuroda (黒田 俊雄, Kuroda Toshio; January 21, 1926 – January 26, 1993) was a Japanese academic, historian and university professor. A specialist in medieval Japanese history and in the history of Japanese thought, he greatly influenced Japanese historiography with several innovative and controversial theories. His ideas were the opposite of what mainstream academics at the time believed, and for this reason his name is often at the center of controversies. His work has been called "seminal", "epochal" and "revolutionary".

== Career ==
Kuroda is known for having published "Shinto in the History of Japanese Religion," which argued that Shinto as an independent religion took shape only in the modern period, having emerged in the medieval age as an offshoot of Buddhism. He is also known for his kenmon taisei (権門体制, system of ruling elites) and kenmitsu (顕密, exoteric - esoteric)" theories.

Kuroda's thought and writings influenced the work of such contemporary academics as John Breen and Mark Teeuwen. The Fall 1996, 23/3–4 issue of Nanzan Institute for Religion and Culture's Japanese Journal of Religious Studies was entirely dedicated to him under the title "The Legacy of Kuroda Toshio".

== Kuroda's position on Shinto ==
In his article "Shinto in the History of Japanese Religion", published in English in 1981, Kuroda argues that Shinto as a "distinct, independent and organized religion" is a Meiji era invention of Japanese nationalist ideologues. According to a BBC website, Kuroda's scholarly writings about Shinto are considered important:

"The scholar Kuroda Toshio has suggested that the traditional view of Shinto as the indigenous religion of Japan stretching back into pre-history is wrong. He argues that Shinto didn't emerge as a separate religion until comparatively modern times, and that this happened for political reasons. The traditional view, he says, is a modern construction of Shinto that has been projected back into history."

Specifically, Kuroda argues that Shinto as a distinct religion was born only in the modern period after emerging in the Middle Ages as an offshoot of Buddhism. He points out how the state formalization of kami rituals and the state ranking of shrines during the Heian period were not the emergence of Shinto as an independent religion, but an effort to explain local beliefs in Buddhist terms. He also claims that, if it's true that the two characters for "Shinto" (神道, Shintō) appear very early in the historical record, for example in the Nihon Shoki, this does not mean today's Shinto already existed as a religion at the time because it can be read as a generic term for popular beliefs. Alternatively, he proposes it could be a name for Taoism, as the term was used contemporaneously in China in that way. Indeed, according to Kuroda, many lasting features of Shinto, for example the worship of mirrors and swords or the very structure of Ise Shrine (Shinto's holiest and most important site) are typical of Taoism. The term Shinto in old texts therefore does not necessarily indicate something uniquely Japanese.

Such has been his influence that today Japanese specialists, when talking about events antecedent the Japanese Middle Ages, to avoid using the term Shinto, have acquired a strong tendency to use instead other terms like jingi shinkō (神祇信仰, kami worship).

== Kuroda's kenmon taisei ==
Another major contribution was his kenmon taisei (権門体制, system of ruling elites) theory. Traditional scholarship characterized medieval history as the period of emergence of military governments and new forms of Buddhism (the Kamakura Buddhist schools like Rinzai and Nichiren). To the contrary, Kuroda emphasized the continuation of the power of the Kyoto court and of the older schools of Buddhism from the Heian period. He claimed that government was not a prerogative of the warrior cast, but rather a power-sharing arrangement between three blocks (the "kenmon" (権門, system of ruling elites)), namely the warriors, the aristocrats, and the religious centers of power, with the Emperor acting as an arbiter.

== Kenmitsu taisei theory ==
Unlike most scholars at the time, Kuroda believed that the dominant branches of Buddhism during the Japanese Middle Ages (1185 - 1603) were not those of the so-called Kamakura New Buddhism, namely the Zen, Jōdo and Nichiren schools, but older ones like the Hossō, Kegon, Tendai, and Shingon, which he called by the collective name kenmitsu taisei (顕密体制, exoteric - esoteric system) Buddhism because the group included both exoteric and esoteric schools of Japanese Buddhism. Representative of the system were powerful temples like Kōfuku-ji, Tōdai-ji, Enryaku-ji, and Tō-ji, whose function was to perform rites for the ruling elites. Because the then-dominant honji suijaku theological theory, which claimed Japanese kami were simply local emanations of Indian Buddhist gods, allowed the kenmitsu schools to incorporate kami cults into Buddhism, shrines dedicated to them could be included into the kenmon taisei political and economic system.

== Selected works ==
In a statistical overview derived from writings by and about Toshio Kuroda, OCLC/WorldCat encompasses roughly 30+ works in 70+ publications in 2 languages and 500+ library holdings.

- 蒙古襲来 (1965)
- 日本中世封建制論 (1974)
- 日本中世の国家と宗教 (1975)
- 寺社勢力: もう一つの中世社会 (1980)
- 歴史学の再生 : 中世史を組み直す (1983)
- 王法と仏法: 中世史の構図 (1983)
- 国家と天皇: 天皇制イデオロギ－としての仏教 (1987)
- 中世寺院史の研究 (1988)
- 日本中世の社会と宗教 (1990)
- 日本中世の国家と宗教 (1990)
