= Iwashimizu Hachimangū =

Shinto shrine in Yawata, Japan

Iwashimizu Hachiman Shrine 石清水八幡宮
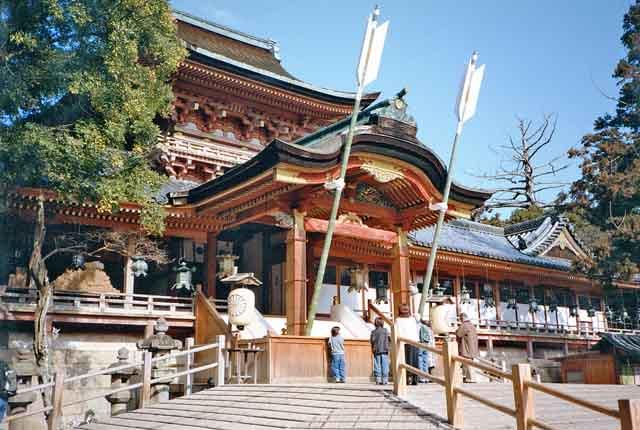
- The Iwashimizu Hachiman Shrine

- Location within Kyoto Prefecture Location within Japan

Religion
- Affiliation: Shinto
- Deity: Hachiman
- Festival: iwashimizu-sai (石清水祭) (September 15th)
- Type: Hachiman Shrine; Kokushi genzaisha Twenty-Two Shrines; Chokusaisha; Beppyo jinja Shikinaisya; Former kanpeitaisha

Location
- Location: Yawata, Kyoto
- Interactive map of Iwashimizu Hachiman Shrine 石清水八幡宮
- Coordinates: 34°52′47″N 135°42′00″E

Architecture
- Style: Hachiman-zukuri
- Established: 859

Website
- www.iwashimizu.or.jp
- Glossary of Shinto National Historic Site of Japan

Iwashimizu Hachimangū (石清水八幡宮) is a Shinto shrine located in the city of Yawata in Kyoto Prefecture, Japan. It is one of the Twenty-Two Shrines in the Heian period ranked system of Shinto shrines, and along with the Ise Grand Shrine, one of the two royal ancestral shrines for the Imperial family. It is one of the three major Hachiman shrines, along with Usa Jingū in Usa, Oita and either Hakozaki Shrine (Higashi-ku, Fukuoka) or Tsurugaoka Hachiman-gū (Kamakura, Kanagawa). Ten buildings of the shrine, including the main hall, have been designated as National Treasures. In January 2012, the grounds of the shrine were designated as a National Historic Site

== Enshrined kami ==
The kami enshrined at Iwashimizu Hachiman-gū is Hachiman, which is identified here as a trinity consisting of:

- Hondawake no Mikoto (誉田別命), the deified spirit of Emperor Ojin (central sanctuary)
- Hime-Ōkami (比咩大神), a compound kami consisting of the three kami of Munakata Taisha (western sanctuary)
- Oki Nagatarashi hime-no-Mikoto (息長帯姫命), the deified spirit of Empress Jingū (eastern sanctuary)

== History ==
In 859, a monk from Daian-ji in Heijō-kyō, modern-day Nara, named Gyōkyō (a disciple of Kūkai) claimed to have received a divine message from Usa Jingū in Buzen Province saying, "I will move my shrine to the peak of Mount Otoko near the capital and protect the country." The following year, in 860, Emperor Seiwa commenced construction on its earliest structures. However, according to the Kamakura period "Miya-dera Enji-shō," there was an "Iwashimizu-dera" on Mount Otoko before the founding of Iwashimizu-Hachiman-gu. Several roof tiles dating back to before the shrine's founding have been discovered on the grounds of the shrine, lending some physical evidence to this account.

This was a period of syncretism between Shinto and Buddhism (Shinbutsu-shūgō), and from the beginning Iwashimizu was primarily a Buddhist complex (jingū-ji) called Iwashimizu Hachiman-gūji (石清水八幡宮寺), with a Yakushi Nyorai as its honzon. In 862 it changed its official name to Gokoku-ji (護国寺) further emphasizing its Buddhist nature.

Iwashimizu Hachiman-gūji was regarded by the Imperial Court as the guardian of the ura-kimon, or supernaturally vulnerable southwestern direction of Heian-kyō, serving a position analogous to Enryaku-ji on Mount Hiei, which guarded the northeastern direction. Due to its proximity to the capital, the shine was regarded in the Engishiki records of 939 as in a position second only the Ise Grand Shrine. The shrine became the object of Imperial patronage throughout the Heian period. In 965, Emperor Murakami ordered that Imperial messengers were sent to report important events to the guardian kami of Japan. These heihaku were initially presented to 16 shrines including the Ōharano Shrine. Over the course if its history, numerous emperors and members of the court came to the shrine to worship. In 979 Emperor Enyū visited the shrine; and the shrine continued to be visited by nearly all the emperors until the reign of Emperor Go-Daigo, when the sovereigns began to live more secluded lives. The shrine overshadowed Usa Jingū in the number of shōen landed estates under its control.

The shrine was also the clan shrine for the influential Minamoto clan, and its various cadet branches (including the Ashikaga clan). Especially after Minamoto no Yoshiie underwent his genpuku ceremony at the shrine, and took the nom-de-guerre of Hachimantarō Yoshiie (八幡太郎義家), the shrine came be associated with the samurai class and for victory in war. Branches of the shrine were established throughout Japan, wherever the Minamoto clan had landholdings. In 1456 Ashikaga Yoshimasa visited the shrine and all the officials of the Daijō-kan joined him in going there. However, after the Ōnin war (1467–1477), Imperial visits were held in abeyance for 200 years. In the Edo period, the approaches to the shrine were lined with 48 sub-shrines.

After the Meiji restoration, in accordance with the Shinbutsu bunri edicts of the new Meiji government, the name of the shrine was changed in 1869 to "Otokoyama Hachiman-gū". The honzon Yakushi Nyorai statue was moved to Tōzan-ji on Awaji island, and other statues to Zenhō-ji at the eastern foot of Mount Otoko. Most of the Buddhist temple structures were dismantled and relocated or destroyed. In 1871 under the Modern system of ranked Shinto Shrines the shrine was designated am Imperial shrine, 1st rank (官幣大社, Kanpei-taisha), meaning that it stood in the first rank of government supported shrines under State Shinto. In January 1918, its name was officially changed to Iwashimizu Hachiman-gū.

== Treasures ==
The Honden of the shrine consists of an inner hall and an outer hall. Where the eaves of the two halls meet there is a "golden gutter" donated by Oda Nobunaga in August 1580. Since it was built by imperial order of Emperor Seiwa in 859, it has burned down many times, undergoing 14 rebuilds and 17 repairs. The reason it is divided into an inner hall and an outer hall is because it is said that the gods move to the outer hall during the day and to the inner hall at night. All of the structures listed below are designated as National Treasures and all were constructed by order of Shogun Tokugawa Iemitsu in 1634.

- Inner Hall (内殿, Naiden)
- Outer Hall (外殿, Gaiden)
- Offering Hall (幣殿, Haiden)
- Dance Hall (舞殿, Maidono)
- East Gate (東門, Higashi Mon)
- West Gate (舞殿, Nishi Mon); The carving of the "Monkey with Eye-Grain" said to have been made by Hidari Jingoro. It is said that this monkey would escape at night and destroy the fields at the foot of the mountain, so a nail was driven into the monkey's right eye to stop it moving.
- Corridors (楼門, Kairō)
- Tower Gate (楼門, Rōmon)
- Takeuchi-sha Honden (摂社武内社本殿, Sessha Takeuchi-sha Honden)

In addition, theb shrine owns many structures and objects which have been designated Important Cultural Properties

== Trivia ==
A 2005 survey of the treasures at Iwashimizu Hachiman-gu revealed, among other things, the existence of a kris, a jeweled Indonesian dagger, which was subsequently exhibited at Kyoto National Museum as part of an exhibit entitled "Famous Swords from Kyoto's Temples and Shrines."

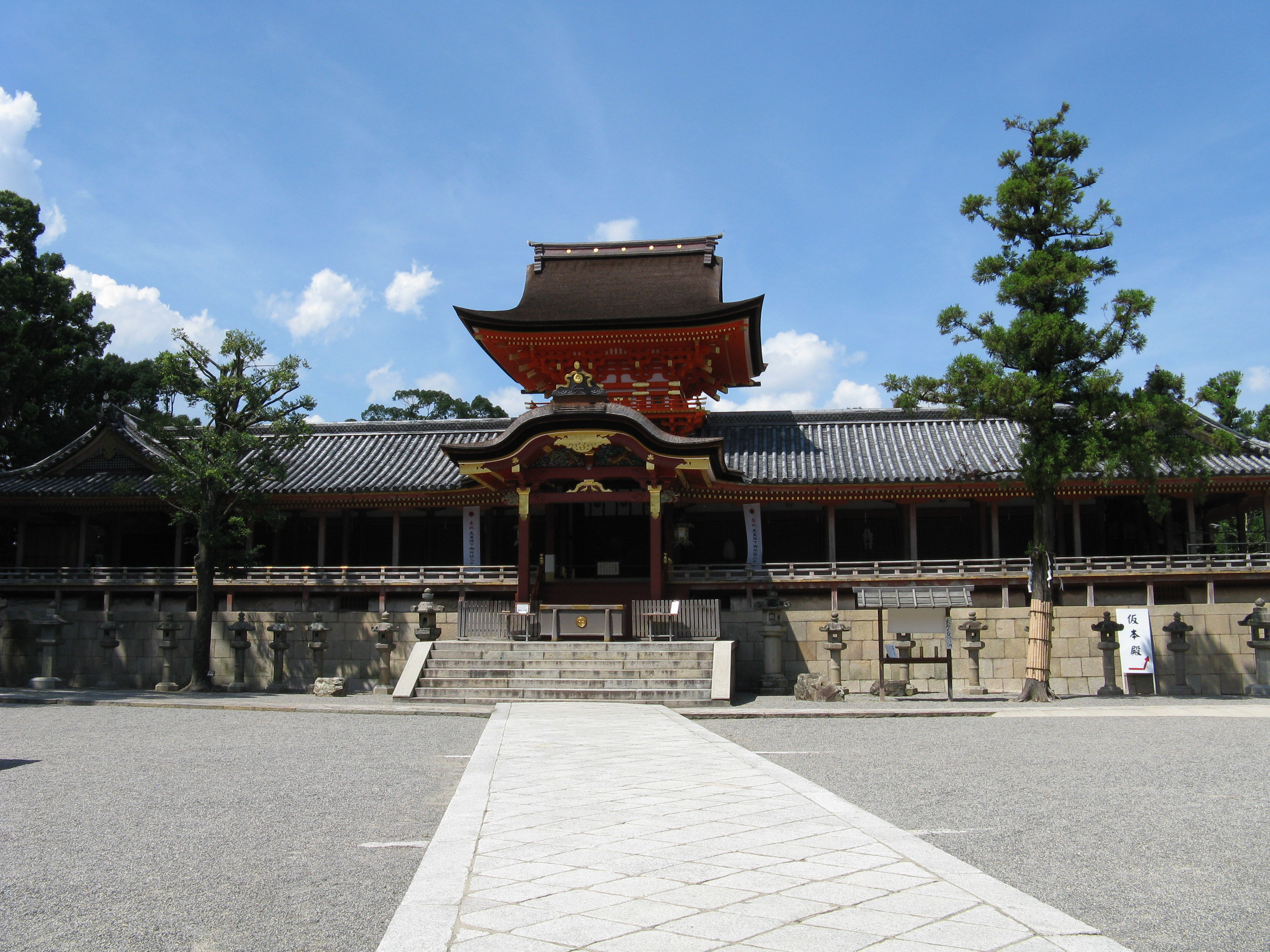
Upper Shrine (NT)

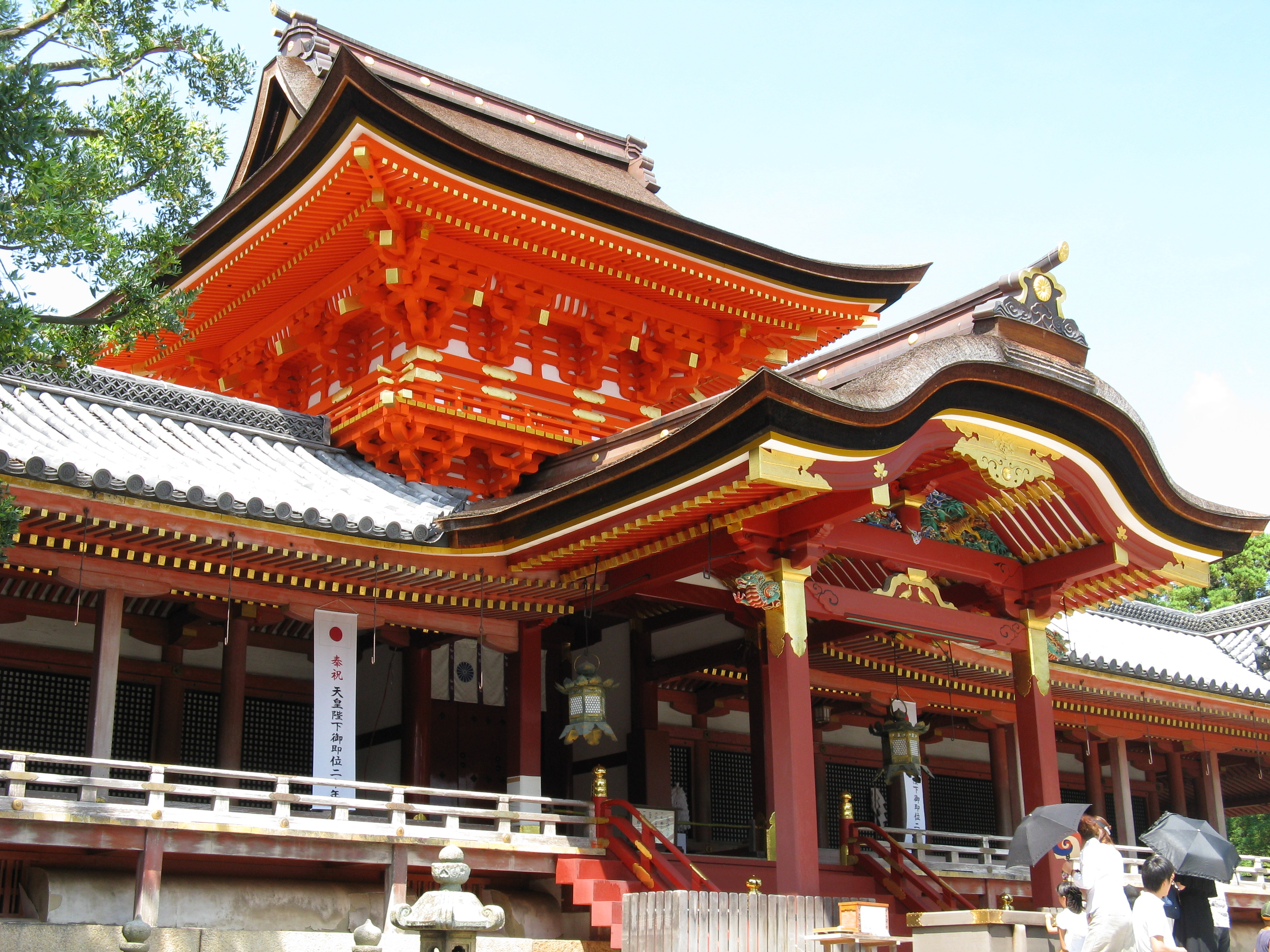
Rōmon (NT)

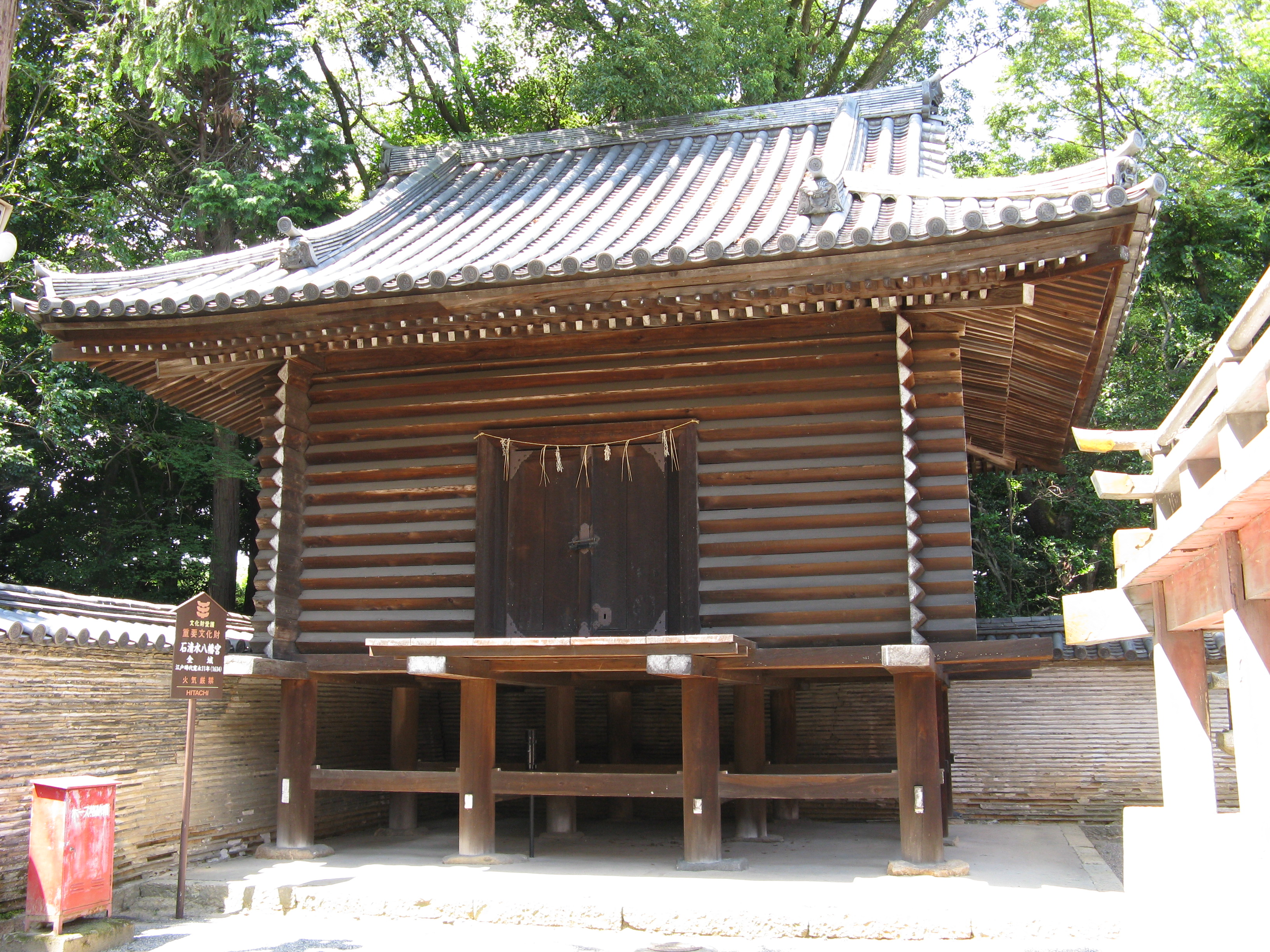
Azekura (Kyoto Prefecture Tangible Cultural Property)

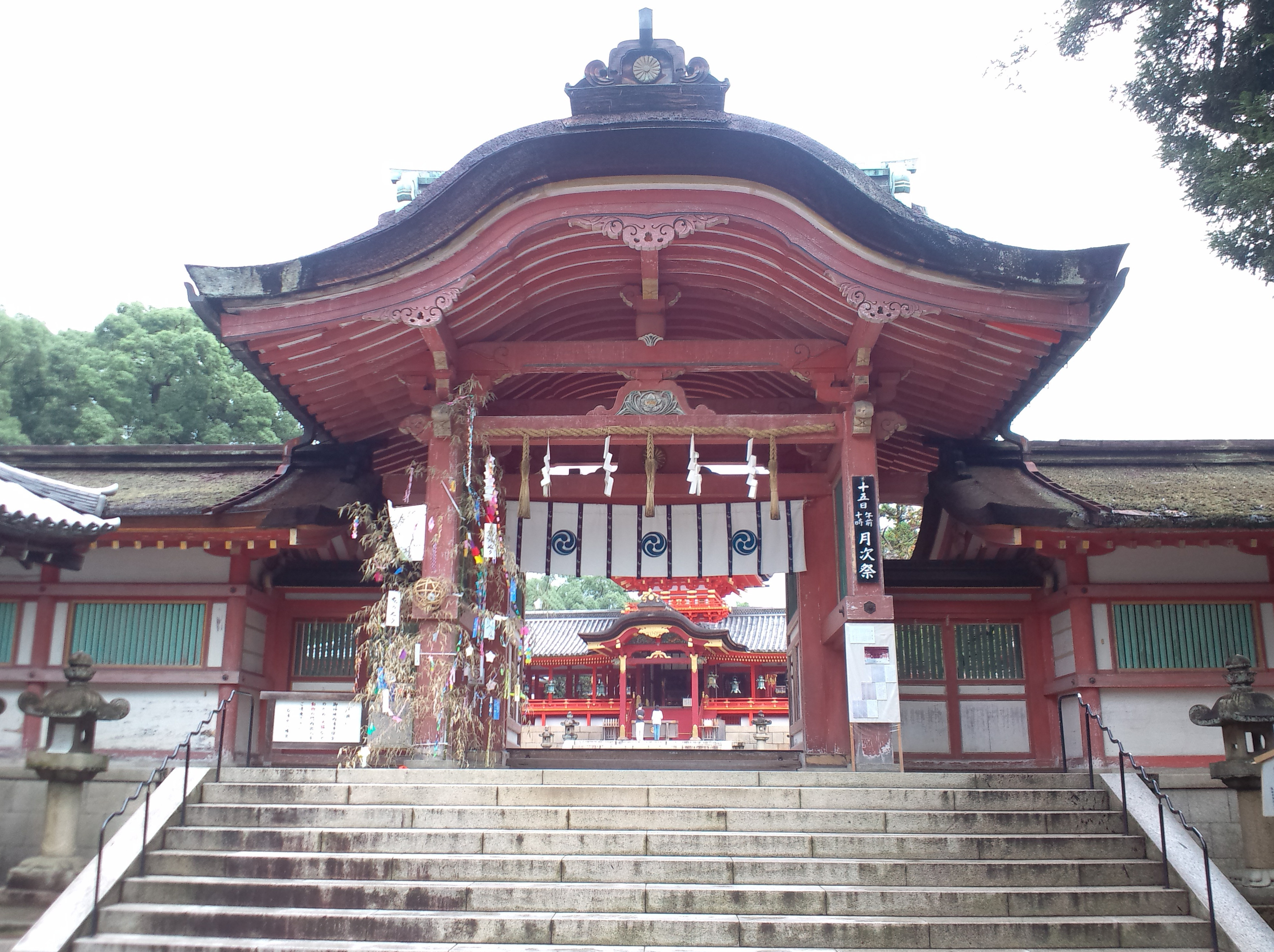
South Gate

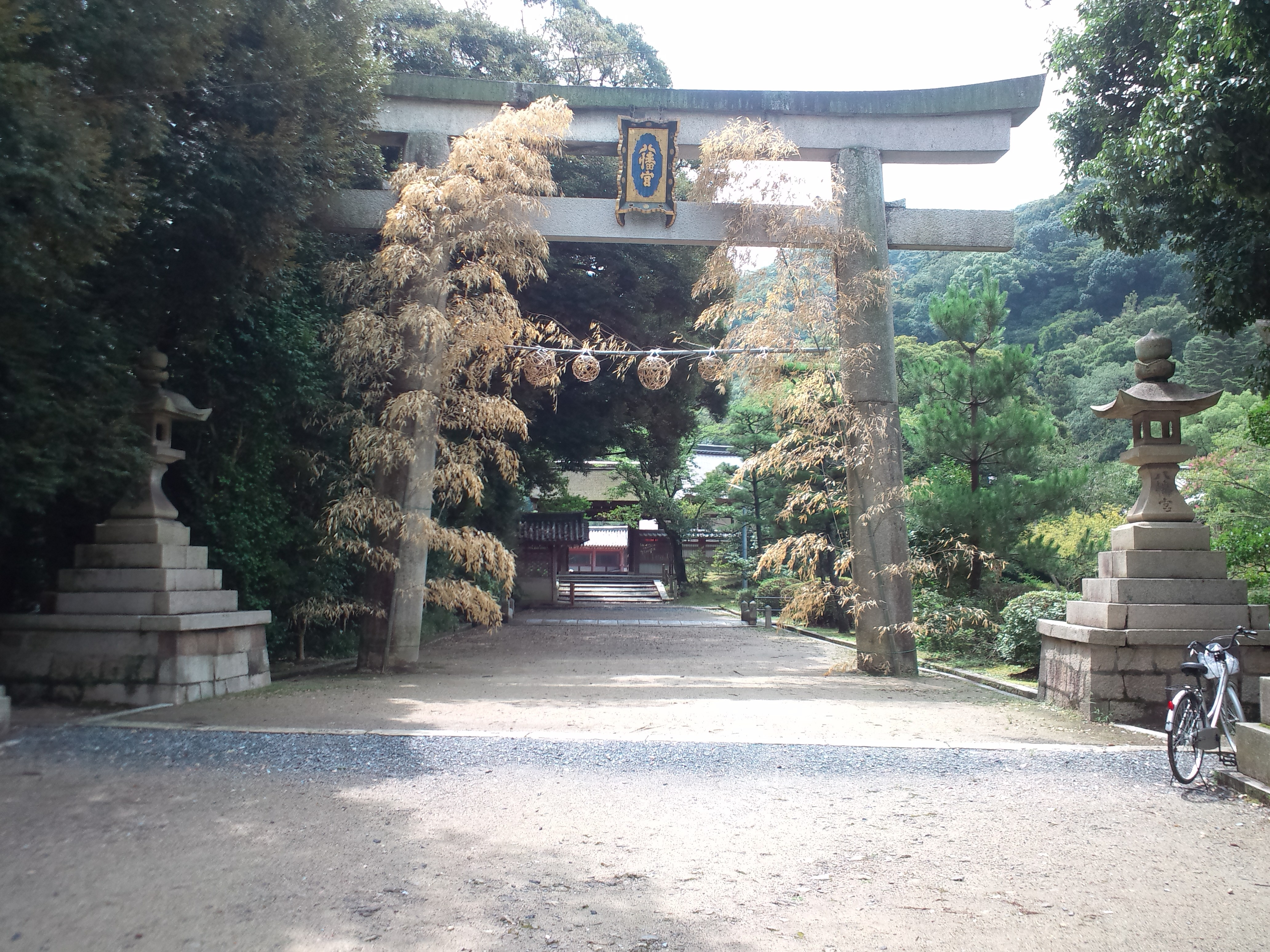
Ichi-no-torii

== See also ==
- List of Shinto shrines
- Twenty-Two Shrines
- Modern system of ranked Shinto Shrines
- List of Historic Sites of Japan (Kyoto)
