= Haibutsu kishaku =

Movement that advocate the expulsion of Buddhism from Japan

Japanese name
- Kana: はいぶつきしゃく
- Kyūjitai: 廢佛毀釋
- Shinjitai: 廃仏毀釈
Transcriptions
- Revised Hepburn: Haibutsu kishaku

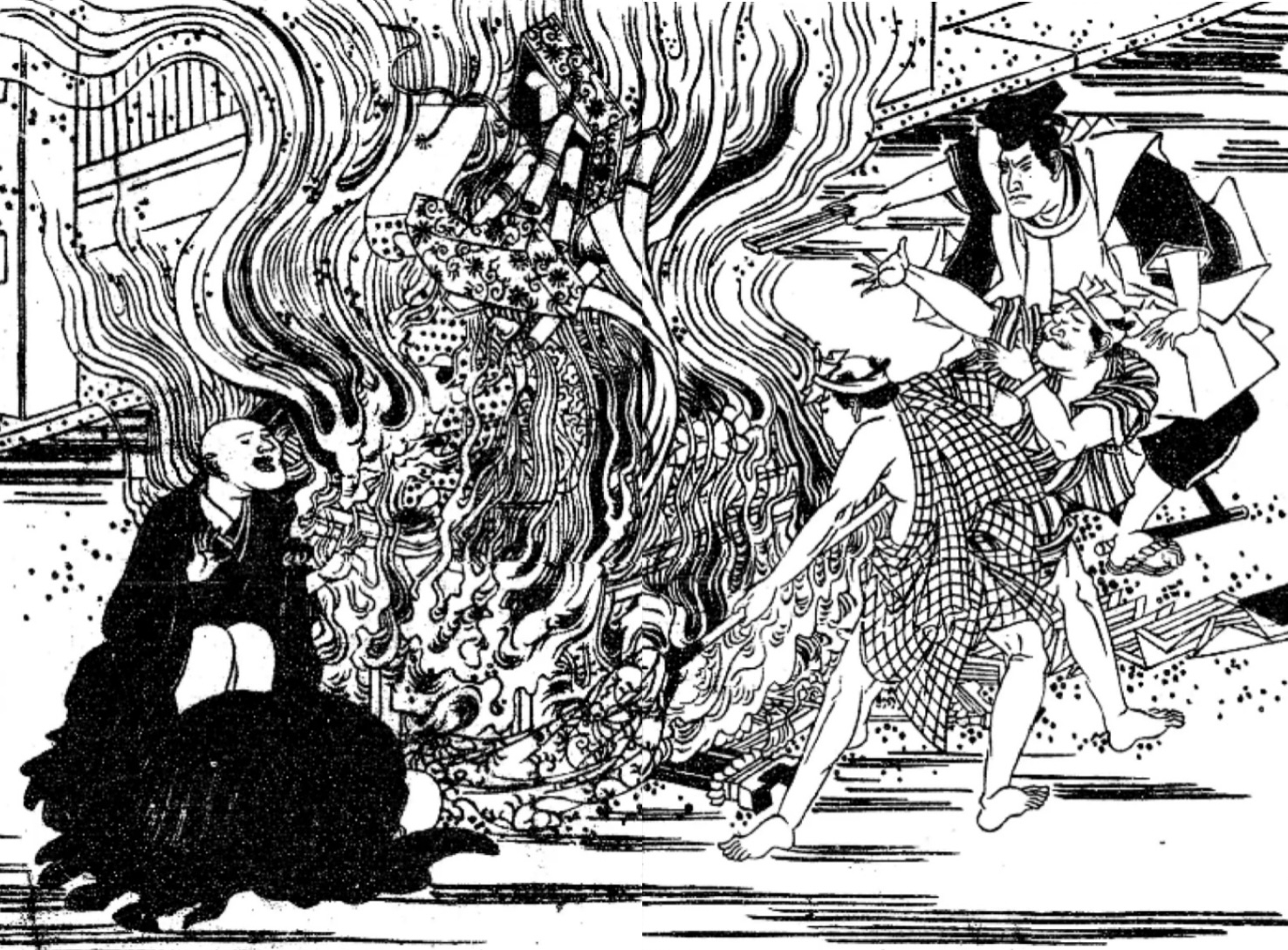
The burning of sūtras during the haibutsu kishaku

Haibutsu kishaku (廃仏毀釈) (literally "abolish Buddhism and destroy Shākyamuni") is a term that indicates a current of thought continuous in Japan's history which advocates the expulsion of Buddhism from Japan. More narrowly, it also indicates a particular historic movement and specific historic events based on that ideology which, during the Meiji Restoration, produced the destruction of Buddhist temples, images and texts, and the forced return to secular life of Buddhist monks. It is a yojijukugo phrase.

== Haibutsu kishaku in history ==
An early example of haibutsu kishaku is the Mononobe clan's anti-Buddhist policies during the time of Buddhism's early introduction to Japan in the Kofun period. The Nakatomi clan, ancestors of the Fujiwara, were allies of the Mononobe in their opposition to Buddhism.

Another example is the policies of temple closure and monk defrocking of the Okayama, Aizu, and Mito Domains, also adopted for political and economic, rather than religious, reasons during the early modern period. These domainal policies were in general based on Confucian anti-Buddhist thought. The Meiji period form of haibutsu kishaku, based on kokugaku and Shinto-centrism, was instead dictated by a desire to distinguish between foreign Buddhism and a purely Japanese Shinto.

== Haibutsu kishaku during the Meiji Restoration ==
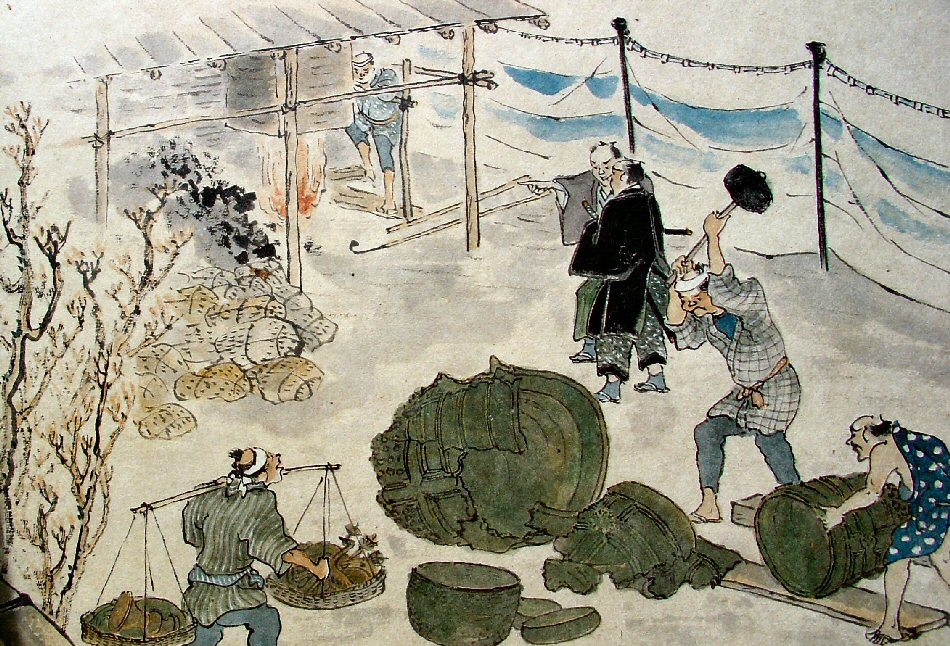
Temple bells being smelted for bronze during the haibutsu kishaku

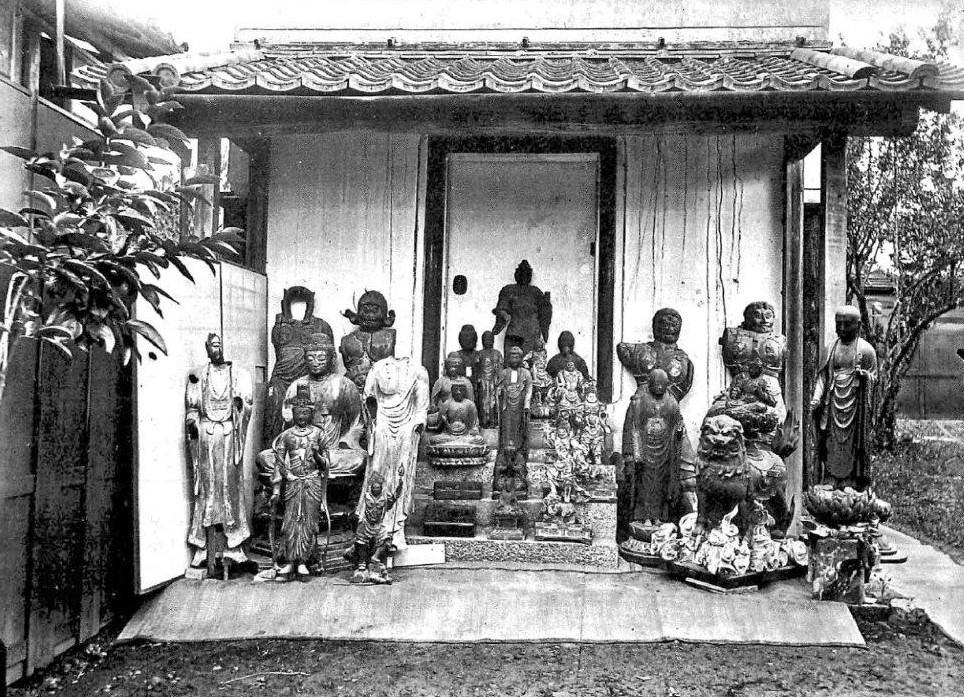
A set of statues from Kōfuku-ji that fell into disrepair, including works by Kaikei. Many of these statues were picked up by collectors and are displayed around the world.

The haibutsu kishaku during the Meiji Restoration, the most famous instance of the phenomenon, was an event triggered by the official policy of separation of Shinto and Buddhism (or shinbutsu bunri) after 1868 caused great damage to Buddhism in Japan. The destruction of Buddhist property took place on a large scale all over the country. For example, Kōfuku-ji in Nara suffered greatly. The temple, which is now a National Treasure, was hit with full force by the movement. The temple's land was seized, the priests forced to become Shinto priests, walls were torn down, trees were planted, and the area became part of one of the city's parks. The anti-Buddhist riots caused damage to all large temples of the city. The violence marked every region of the country permanently. Between 1872 and 1874, 18 thousand temples were eradicated, and maybe as many again from 1868 to 1872. Japanologist Martin Collcutt believes Japanese Buddhism was on the verge of total eradication.

The violence had just released pent-up popular anger at the Buddhists which had been brewing for centuries because of their close alliance with the Tokugawa in the danka system, an alliance from which the religion had derived immense benefit. Although the shogunate's official philosophy was lay Neo-Confucianism, Buddhism had become an integral part of the state as a consequence of the Tokugawa's anti-Christian policy. To stop the propagation of the Christian religion, they had introduced the danka system, which obliged families to affiliate themselves with a Buddhist temple and, in return, this would certify that they were not Christian. Without this certification a normal life in Tokugawa Japan was impossible. Because of this, temples could and often would blackmail parishioners. Under the danka system families had by law several obligations towards Buddhist institutions, among them monetary donations to their affiliated temple. Because there were some 100,000 temples in a country of 30 million people, on average 300 persons had to support a temple, so the burden was considerable. Buddhism, as an institution, had a vested interest in the shogunate system, and therefore became a target of all the parties working for the downfall of the shogunate.

There were definite political and economic motivations too, in that the domainal governments wanted to restore public finances at Buddhists' expense, and the shinbutsu bunri offered a pretext to appropriate Buddhist lands.

It is estimated that 40,000 Buddhist temples were destroyed in Japan during this nationwide movement, and in certain places the percentage of Buddhist temples destroyed reached 80%.

It is difficult to estimate how many temples were closed during the turmoil, because it seems likely that many disappeared simply because Buddhist authorities, taking advantage of the fall of the Tokugawa, were trying to streamline the system and eliminate redundancies. Under the shogunate, obtaining the permission to open or close a temple had not been easy. However, the complete disappearance of Buddhist temples from domains like Satsuma was indeed due to the haibutsu kishaku.

== See also ==
- Buddhas of Bamyan#Attacks on the Buddha's statue
- Buddhism in Japan
- Buddhist crisis
- Chittagong Hill Tracts Conflict
- Hujum
- Iconoclasm
- Koshintō
- Martyrs of Japan
- Persecution of Buddhists
- Shinbutsu bunri
- Shinbutsu kakuri
- Shinbutsu-shūgō
- State Shinto
- Tokugawa Nariaki
- USSR anti-religious campaign (1928-1941)
