= Bernhard Scheid =

Austrian historian, academic, and Japanologist

Bernhard Scheid (born 1960) is an Austrian historian, academic, and Japanologist, affiliated to the Austrian Academy of Sciences and the Institute of East Asian Studies at the University of Vienna (Institut für Ostasienkunde der Universität Wien). In addition, Scheid counts among the Austrian top players of the game of Go.

== Early life ==
Scheid matriculated at the University of Vienna in 1980. His early interest in cultural anthropology led to a specialization in Japanese studies. He earned a master's degree in 1993. From 1994 to 1996, he studied at Waseda University in Tokyo. His Ph.D. was awarded by the University of Vienna in 1999.

== Career ==
Scheid started working as a research fellow at the Austrian Academy of Sciences, Institute for the Cultural and Intellectual History of Asia (Institut für Kultur- und Geistesgeschichte Asiens) in 1990. In 2002, he became a permanent research fellow in the field of Japanese Studies at this institution. He also joined the faculty of the Department of East Asian Studies at Vienna University in 2001 as a lecturer on Japanese religion. In 2012, he served as a visiting professor at the University of Göttingen, faculty of religious studies.

His early research and writing investigated aspects of aging and becoming old in the Japanese Middle Ages (12th–16th centuries), from the late-Heian period through the Sengoku period. According to Scheid's first published work, Im Innersten meines Herzens empfinde ich tiefe Scham: das Alter im Schrifttum das japanischen Mittelalters (In my Heart of Hearts I Feel Deep Shame: Aging in the Japanese Medieval Literature), the perceived norm of old age primarily as a time of suffering and isolation changed in a context of the newly emerging feudal structures.

In 2001, Scheid produced the first monograph on Yoshida Shintō in a Western language, including translations of three important Yoshida texts. The comprehensive religious system which became known as Yoshida Shinto was founded by Yoshida Kanetomo (1435–1511). Scheid's work investigated this seminal figure's influence on the evolution of Shinto ritual and theology in the Muromachi period through the Azuchi-Momoyama period. Since then, Scheid produced a number of academic articles and edited volumes on various aspects of Shinto and Japanese religious history in general. In 2017 and 2020, he received grants from the Austrian Science Fund (FWF) to lead two consecutive research projects on the history of Shinto in Early Modern (Edo-period) Japan.

In the course of his research activities, Scheid has also developed and maintained academic websites with the objective of advancing teaching and research in Japanese studies.

== Go ==
Scheid began playing Go in the early 1980s and quickly advanced to one of the top Go players of that country, winning the Austrian National Go Championship six times in 1990, 1992, 1998, 1999, 2003, and 2004. From 1991, he qualified as Austrian representative in various international Amateur Go Championships in Japan, China, and Korea. In 2010, he tied for 16th place in the 31st World Amateur Go Championship (WAGC) in Hangzhou, China.

== Selected works ==
=== Monographs and edited volumes ===
- Köck, Stefan; Pickl-Kolaczia, Brigitte; Scheid, Bernhard, eds. (2021). Religion. Power, and the Rise of Shinto in Early Modern Japan. London: Bloomsbury.
- Deeg, Max; Scheid, Bernhard, eds. (2015). Religion in China: Major Concepts and Minority Positions. Vienna: Austrian Academy of Sciences.
- Scheid, Bernhard; Nakai, Kate Wildman, eds. (2013). Kami Ways in Nationalist Territory: Shinto Studies in Prewar Japan and the West. Vienna: Austrian Academy of Sciences.
- Scheid, Bernhard; Teeuwen, Mark, eds. (2006). The Culture of Secrecy in Japanese Religion. London: Routledge.
- Teeuwen, Mark; Scheid, Bernhard, eds. (2002). Tracing Shinto in the History of Kami Workshop. Japanese Journal of Religious Studies. Vol. 29/3-4 (special issue). Nagoya: Nanzan Institute for Religion and Culture.
- Scheid, Bernhard (2001). Der eine und einzige Weg der Götter: Yoshida Kanetomo und die Erfindung des Shinto (in German). Vienna: Austrian Academy of Sciences.
- Scheid, Bernhard (1996). Im Innersten meines Herzens empfinde ich tiefe Scham: das Alter im Schrifttum das japanischen Mittelalters (in German). Vienna: Austrian Academy of Sciences.

=== Digital projects ===
- Scheid, Bernhard. "Religion-in-Japan". Religion in Japan: Ein digitales Handbuch (in German). University of Vienna, since 2001.
- Scheid, Bernhard. "Nihon Ryō-Wiki" (in German). University of Vienna, since 2010.
- Scheid, Bernhard. "Kamigraphie". Kamigraphie: Zur Ikonographie und Ikonologie japanischer Gottheiten (in German). University of Vienna, since 2011.
- Scheid, Bernhard. "Japan Bibliographie". Deutschsprachige Japan-Bibliographie 1980–2000 (in German). Austrian Academy of Sciences, since 2016.
- Scheid, Bernhard. "Pok's Go Space". Pok's Go Space: Notes on Go in Austria (in German and English). Austrian Go Federation, since 2003.

== External Sources ==
- academia.edu
- ORCID
- WorldCat
