= Shinbutsu bunri =

Separation of Shinto from Buddhism

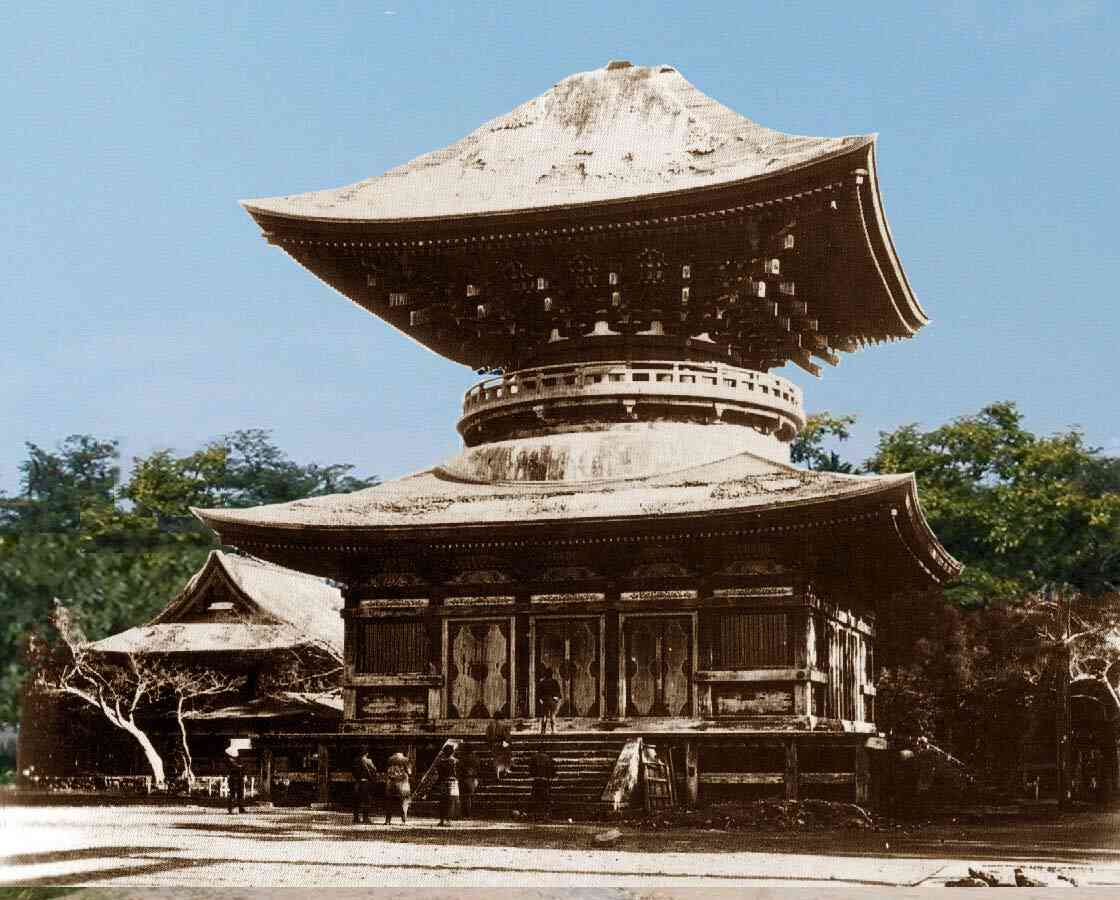
A Buddhist pagoda (a Yakushi-dō (薬師堂) at Tsurugaoka Hachimangū shrine in Kamakura before the shinbutsu bunri

The Japanese term shinbutsu bunri (神仏分離) indicates the separation of Shinto from Buddhism, introduced after the Meiji Restoration which separated Shinto kami from buddhas, and also Buddhist temples from Shinto shrines, which were originally amalgamated. It is a yojijukugo phrase.

== Background before 1868 ==
Until the end of the Edo period in 1868, Shinto and Buddhism were intimately connected in what was called shinbutsu-shūgō (神仏習合), to the point that the same buildings were often used as both Shinto shrines and Buddhist temples, and Shinto gods were interpreted as manifestations of Buddhas. However, the tendency to oppose Buddhism as a foreign import and to uphold Shinto as the native religion can be seen already during the early modern era, partly as a nationalistic reaction.

In a broad sense, the term shinbutsu bunri indicates the effects of the anti-Buddhist movement that, from the middle of the Edo period onwards, accompanied the spread of Confucianism, the growth of studies of ancient Japanese literature and culture (kokugaku), and the rise of Shinto-based nationalism. All these movements had reasons to oppose Buddhism.

== Policy of the Meiji government ==
In a narrower sense, shinbutsu bunri refers to the policy of separating Shinto and Buddhism pursued by the new Meiji government with the Kami and Buddhas Separation Order (神仏判然令, Shinbutsu Hanzenrei) of 1868. This order triggered the haibutsu kishaku, a violent anti-Buddhist movement that caused the forcible closure of thousands of temples, the confiscation of their land, the forced return of many monks to lay life or their transformation into Shinto priests, and the destruction of numerous books, statues and other Buddhist artefacts. Even bronze bells were melted down to make cannons.

However, the process of separation stalled by 1873, the government's intervention in support of the order was relaxed, and even today the separation is still only partially complete: many major Buddhist temples retain small shrines dedicated to tutelary Shinto kami, and some Buddhist figures, such as the Bodhisattva Kannon, are revered in Shinto shrines. The policy failed in its short-term aims and was ultimately abandoned, but it was successful in the long term in creating a new religious status quo in which Shinto and Buddhism are perceived as different and independent.

== Details of the policy ==
The new government that seized power in 1868 saw shinbutsu bunri as a way to reduce the immense wealth and power of the Buddhist sects. At the same time, it was supposed to give Shinto, and especially its cult of the Emperor, time to grow into an effective vehicle for nationalism.

A first order issued by the Jinguji Muka in April 1868 ordered the defrocking of shasō and bettō (shrine monks performing Buddhist rites at Shinto shrines).

A few days later, the Daijōkan banned the application of Buddhist terminology such as gongen to Japanese kami and the veneration of Buddhist statues in shrines.

Next came a ban on applying the Buddhist term Daibosatsu (Great Bodhisattva) to the syncretic kami Hachiman at the Iwashimizu Hachiman-gū and Usa Hachiman-gū shrines.

In the final stage, all the defrocked bettō and shasō were told to become "shrine priests" (kannushi) and return to their shrines. Also, monks of the Nichiren sect were told not to refer to some deities as kami.

== Consequences of the policy ==
The campaign ultimately failed to destroy the influence of Buddhism on the Japanese people, who still needed funerals, graves and ancestral rites, all services traditionally provided by Buddhism. The state's first attempt to influence religious life therefore resulted in failure. In 1873, the government admitted that the effort to elevate Shinto above Buddhism had failed. The government did cause the diffusion of the idea that Shinto was the true religion of the Japanese, finally revealed after remaining for a long time hidden behind Buddhism.

In recent years, many historians have come to believe that the syncretism of kami and Buddhas (shinbutsu-shūgō) was just as authentically Japanese. The government was successful in separating Shinto and Buddhism in Japan as completely independent religions. Most Japanese today are unaware that some of their customary religious practices cannot be understood outside the context of the syncretism of kami and Buddhas. In discussing some Japanese Buddhist temples dedicated to the cult of kami Inari, Shinto scholar Karen Smyers comments:

Recent scholarship has shown the term [Shinto] to be highly problematic – its current content is largely a political construction of the Meiji period. [...] The surprise of many of my informants regarding the existence of Buddhist Inari temples shows the success of the government's attempt to create separate conceptual categories regarding sites and certain identities, although practice remains multiple and nonexclusive.

== Haibutsu kishaku ==
Although the government did not explicitly order the closing of temples, the destruction of Buddhist property or the defrocking of Buddhist priests and nuns, they were often interpreted as implying it, and the haibutsu kishaku movement soon spread across the country. The shinbutsu bunri policy was itself the direct cause of serious damage to important cultural properties. Because mixing the two religions was now forbidden, shrines and temples had to give away some of their treasures.

For example, the giant Niō (仁王), wooden statues of guardian beings, at the entrance of the Tsurugaoka Hachiman-gū, a shrine in Kamakura, were objects of Buddhist worship and therefore illegal where they were, so they were sold to Jufuku-ji, where they still stand today. The shrine also had to destroy Buddhism-related buildings, for example its tahōtō tower, its midō (御堂), and its shichidō garan (七堂伽藍). Many Buddhist temples were simply closed, like Zenkō-ji, to which the now-independent Meigetsu-in used to belong.

Another consequence of the policy was the creation of so-called "invented traditions". To avoid the destruction of material illegal under the new rules, Shinto and Buddhist priests invented traditions, genealogies and other information that justified its presence. Later, awareness of their origin was often lost, causing considerable confusion among historians.

== See also ==
- Buddhism in Japan
- Glossary of Shinto
