= Glossary of Shinto =

This is the glossary of Shinto, including major terms on the subject. Words followed by an asterisk (*) are illustrated by an image in one of the photo galleries.

== A ==
- Akabeko (赤べこ, lit. 'red cow') – A red papier-mâché cow bobblehead toy; a kind of engimono and an omiyage (a regional souvenir in Japan) that is considered symbolic of Aizu.
- Akomeôgi (衵扇, lit. 'chemise fan') – A type of fan held by aristocratic women of the Heian period when formally dressed; it is brightly painted with tassels and streamers on the ends. Held today in Shinto by a miko in formal costume for festivals. See also hiôgi.
- Aku (悪, lit. 'evil') – The term's meaning is not limited to moral evil, and includes misfortune, inferiority and unhappiness.
- Akuma (悪魔, lit. 'devil') – A malevolent fire spirit, demon or devil.
- Akuru (悪樓, lit. 'evil tower') – Also known as the Akujin, the Kibi-no-Ananowatari-no-Kami and as the Anato-no-Kami, Akuru is a malevolent kami that is mentioned in the Keikoki (records regarding the time of the Emperor Keiko), the Nihonshoki (Chronicles of Japan), and the Kojiki (The Records of Ancient Matters).
- Akuryō (悪霊, lit. 'evil spirit') – A malevolent spirit, demon or devil.
- Akuryō Taisan (悪霊退散) – A spell or command to dispel a malevolent spirit, demon, or devil. One of the earliest uses of this phrase can be seen in Dōjōji.
- Ama (天, lit. 'heaven(ly)') – The divine/deva realm of incarnation, the highest realm on the Wheel of Reincarnation.
- Amagatsu (天児, lit. 'heaven(ly) newborn') – See hōko.
- Amakudari (天降 & 天下り, lit. 'heavenly descent') – A (living) being who is an incarnation of a divine being; an avatar.
- Amano-Iwato (天岩戸, lit. 'Heavenly Rock Cave') – In Shinto, Amano-Iwato is the name of the cave where Amaterasu fled after the violent actions of Susanoo caused the death of one of her weavers. Thus, the land was deprived of light, and mononoke from hell were free to roam the lands and wreak havoc. It took the other kami to lure her out again, restoring the sun to the world.
- Amatsu-Mikaboshi (天津甕星, lit. 'Dread Star of Heaven' or 'August Star of Heaven'), also-known-as Ame-no-kagase-o (天香香背男) – Originally a rebellious Shinto god who would not submit to the will of the other Amatsukami. Under Chinese Buddhist influence, the god was identified with Myōken, either as the Pole Star or Venus, before being combined with the god of all stars, Ama-no-mi-naka-nushi (天之御中主神, lit. 'Divine Lord of the Middle-Heavens'). In some versions, Amatsu-Mikaboshi was born from the blood of Kagutsuchi spilt by Izanagi, after Kagutsuchi's birth. Amatsu-Mikaboshi is mentioned in passing in the Nihon Shoki as being subdued by Takemikazuchi, during the latter's conquest of the land of Izumo.
- Amanojaku (天の邪鬼, lit. 'malevolent spirit from heaven') – An oni-like creature in Japanese folklore; the amanojaku is thought to be able to provoke a person's darkest desires, and can instigate them into perpetrating wicked deeds. Similar to Amanozako. See also jaki and jama.
- Ama-no-uki-hashi (天之浮橋, lit. 'floating bridge of heaven') – In Shinto, it is the bridge connecting Earth and Takamagahara.
- Amanozako (天逆毎, lit. 'Opposing Heaven') – A goddess mentioned in the Kujiki, which states that she originated when Susanoo let his ara-mitama build up inside him until he vomited her out. Similar to amanojaku.
- Amaterasu Ōmikami (天照大神, 天照大御神 or 天照皇大神, lit. 'Heaven(ly) Illumination Great Honourable Imperial Divinity') – The Shinto sun goddess, tutelary kami and ancestor of the Emperor, enshrined at Ise Shrine.
- Amatsukami (天津神, lit. 'Heavenly Deities') – Kami from Takamagahara.
- Amatsu tsumi (天津罪 / 天つ罪, lit. 'Crimes in Heaven') – A term for tsumi specifically committed against heaven. For example, the crimes committed by Susanoo-no-Mikoto against Amaterasu are considered amatsu tsumi. The corresponding concept to amatsu tsumi is kunitsu tsumi.
- Ame-no-Nuhoko (天沼矛, 天之瓊矛 or 天瓊戈, lit. 'Jewel(ed) Spear of Heaven') – The spear used by Izanagi and Izanami to raise the primordial landmass, Onogoro-shima, from the sea; it is often depicted as a naginata.
- Ame-no-Uzume (天宇受売命 or 天鈿女命, lit. 'Shining Heavenly Sky Goddess') – The Shinto goddess of the dawn, mirth, meditation, revelry and the arts, and the wife of Sarutahiko Ōkami. See also Otafuku.
- An* (案, lit. 'table' or 'platform') – A small portable table or platform used during Shinto ceremonies to bear offerings. It may have four, eight or sixteen legs.
- Ano-Yo (あの世, lit. 'that world') – See seishinkai.
- Anzen (安全, lit. 'safety' or 'security') – A type of omamori, specifically for safety, particularly safety at work, frequently requested from a kami, and in fact corporations often have a tutelary shrine specifically to ensure their business prospers.
- Aoi Matsuri (葵祭, lit. 'Hollyhock Festival') – One of the three main annual festivals held in Kyoto, Japan (the other two being the Festival of the Ages (Jidai Matsuri) and the Gion Festival). It is a festival of the two kamo shrines in the north of the city: Shimogamo Shrine and Kamigamo Shrine. The festival may also be referred to as the Kamo Festival. It is held on 15 May of each year.
- Ara-mitama (荒魂, lit. 'Wild Soul') – The rough and violent side of the mitama. The ara-mitama is associated with the colours black and purple, and the cardinal direction north. Ama-no-Zako is actually the incarnated ara-mitama of Susanoo-no-Mikoto.
- Aruki miko (歩き巫女, lit. 'wandering shrine maiden') – An itinerant miko that is not in service to a particular shrine, and wanders throughout the country performing services where needed, and living off-of charity.
- Ashihara no Nakatsukuni (葦原の中つ国, lit. The "Middle country of reed beds") – In Shinto, this term is applied to the plane of existence that exists between Takamagahara and Yomi, or the realm of the living. The term became another word for the country or the location of Japan itself. The term can be used interchangeably with Toyoashihara no Nakatsukuni.
- A-un (阿吽, lit. 'Om') – In Shinto-Buddhism, a-un is the transliteration in Japanese of the two syllables "a" and "hūṃ", written in Devanagari as अहूँ (the syllable, Om). See also Nio and Gozu and Mezu.
- Ayakashi (妖怪, lit. 'Strange, Unusual, Supernatural, Paranormal, Extraordinary') – An umbrella term that covers ghosts, phantoms, phantasms, apparitions and illusions, goblins, monsters, demons, devils and any kind of supernatural beasts and beings; the corporeal and the incorporeal; real or fantasy; ayakashi is a term more specific for yōkai that appear above the surface of some body of water. See also rinka, shiranui, will-o'-the-wisp, and St. Elmo's fire.
- Azusa yumi (梓弓, lit. 'cherry birch bow') – a sacred bow used in certain Shinto rituals in Japan, as well as a Japanese musical bow; made from the wood of the Japanese cherry birch tree (Betula grossa). Playing an azusa yumi forms part of some Shinto rituals; in Japan, it is universally believed that merely the twanging of the bowstring will frighten ghosts and evil spirits away from a house.

== B ==
- Bakemono (化け物, lit. 'transforming thing') – A monstrous apparition; a monster or ghost.
- Banbutsu (万物, lit. 'ten thousand things') – A term used to refer to the whole world.
- Banshō (万象, lit. 'ten thousand likenesses') – A term describing all things.
- Bekkū or betsugū (別宮, lit. 'separate temple/shrine') – A subsidiary shrine next to the honden, which may however enshrine an equally important kami.
- Benzaiten (弁才天, 弁財天, lit. 'Heavenly-Happy Talents') – Originally a Vedic goddess, Sarasvati, Benzaiten is a syncretic goddess and a member of the Seven Lucky Gods. She is also syncretized with Ichikishima-hime-no-mikoto (市杵島姫命, lit. 'Female [goddess] of the Island of Worship').
- Bettō (別当, lit. 'acting-division head') – Before the shinbutsu bunri, when the Meiji period law forbade the mixing of Shinto and Buddhism, a bettō was a monk who performed Buddhist rites at a Shinto shrine.
- Bishamonten – Syncretic deity of Buddhist origin part of the Seven Lucky Gods. A symbol of authority, he protects warriors.
- Bon Matsuri (盆, lit. 'Votive offering Festival') – A festival celebrated around July 15 in order to console the spirits of the dead. In theory a Buddhist festival, but in practice an ancestor and family festival part of Shinto.
- Bonshō (梵鐘, lit. 'Buddhist temple bell') – Large bells found in Buddhist temples throughout Japan, used to summon the monks to prayer and to demarcate periods of time. Instead of containing a clapper, bonshō are struck from the outside using either a handheld mallet or a beam suspended on ropes. See also suzu, kagura suzu, rin, and dōtaku.
- Bosatsu (菩薩) – A bodhisattva. Term of Buddhist origin which is often used for deities of mixed Buddhist/Shinto ancestry such as Benzaiten and jizō, kami like Hachiman, and deified human beings like Tokugawa Ieyasu.
- Bōrei (亡霊, lit. 'deceased spirit') – A term for a ghost; a type of yūrei, but one whose identity (and grudge) is unknown.
- Bokusen (卜占, lit. 'divination, scrying, fortune-telling') – The act of divining; foreseeing or a foretelling of future events. See also futomani and ukehi.
- Buden (舞殿, lit. 'dance hall') – Another word for a kaguraden, a pavilion or stage dedicated to the performing of the kagura.
- Bunrei (分霊, lit. 'soul division') – A process of division of a kami producing two complete copies of the original, one of which is then transferred to a new shrine by a process called kanjō.
- Bunsha (分社, lit. 'shrine division') – A shrine that is a part of a network headed by a more famous shrine, from whence its kami was transferred by kanjō.
- Busshitsukai (物質界, lit. 'material world') – The corporeal world.

== C ==
- Chi (智, lit. 'wisdom, knowledge, intelligence') – One of the virtues of bushido.
- Chigi* (千木, lit. 'Thousand Wood(en beams)') – Forked decorations common at the ends of the roof of shrines.
- Chihara (襅, 千早, lit. 'finishing-touch robe') – A type of ceremonial overcoat with a long white hem worn by a Miko in certain Shinto ceremonies; similar to a Kannushi's Jōe over-robes.
- Chinja (鎮社, lit. 'garrison shrine') – The tutelary kami or tutelary shrine of a certain area or Buddhist temple; see also chinjusha.
- Chinjusha* (鎮守社, lit. 'garrison protector shrine') – a small shrine dedicated to the tutelary kami of an area or building (see also Chinju).
- Chitose ame (千歳飴, lit. 'thousand-year candy') – Long, thin sticks of red-and-white candy—which symbolizes healthy growth and longevity—sold at festivals for children, specifically for Shichi-Go-San. Chitose ame is given in a bag decorated with a crane and a turtle—which represent long life in Japan. Chitose ame is wrapped in thin, clear, and edible rice paper film that resembles plastic.
- Chōchin (提灯, lit. 'portable lantern') – Paper lanterns always present at Shinto festivals.
- Chōchō (蝶, lit. 'butterfly') – Butterflies native to Japan and to Japanese culture. The chōchō is also featured among engimono (above).It is seen as lucky, especially if seen in pairs; if a symbol contains two butterflies dancing around each other, it is a symbol of marital happiness.
- Chikushō (畜生, lit. 'animal/livestock') – The mortal, animal realm of incarnation, the third-lowest realm on the wheel of reincarnation. See also rinne.
- Chōzubachi (手水鉢, lit. 'hand-washing earthenware basin') – Usually made of stone, a chōzubachi is a water bowl, is a vessel used to rinse the hands in Japanese temples, shrines and gardens; see also Chōzuya.
- Chōzuya (手水舎, lit. 'hand-washing pavilion') – A Shinto water ablution pavilion for a ceremonial purification rite. The pavilion contains a large water-filled basin called a chōzu-bachi.
- Chinkon (鎮魂, lit. 'the calming of the spirits') – A Shinto ritual performed for converting ara-mitama into nigi-mitama, quelling maleficent spirits, prevent misfortune and alleviate fear from events and circumstances that could not otherwise be explained; i.e. Ara-mitama that failed to achieve deification due to lack of sufficient veneration, or who lost their divinity following attrition of worshipers, became yōkai. See also; Segaki.
- Chinkonsei (鎮魂祭, lit. 'Calming-of-the Spirits Service' or 'Requiem') – A Shinto Matsuri (a festival) performed for converting ara-mitama into nigi-mitama, quelling maleficent spirits, preventing misfortune and alleviating fear from events and circumstances that could not otherwise be explained.
- Chūgi (忠義, lit. 'Duty and Loyalty') – One of the virtues of bushido.

== D ==
- Daijōsai (大嘗祭, lit. 'Great Tastes Festival') – A ceremony marking the beginning of an emperor's reign in which he offers first fruits to ancestors, including Amaterasu.
- Daikokuten (大黒天, lit. 'Great Black Heavens') – A syncretic god, part of the Seven Lucky God fusing Mahakala, and Ōkuninushi.
- Daikyōkan Jigoku (大叫喚地獄, lit. 'Hell of Great Screaming') – The fifth level of Jigoku; sinners who have committed murder (even the murder of small creatures such as insects), theft, degeneration, drunkenness, and lying are sent here.
- Daishonetsu Jigoku (大焦熱地獄, lit. 'Hell of Great Burning') – The seventh level of Jigoku. Sinners who have committed murder (even the murder of small creatures such as insects), theft, degeneration, drunkenness, lying, blasphemy, and rape are sent here.
- Den-den daiko (でんでん太鼓) – a Japanese hand-held pellet drum that is used in Shinto-Buddhist ceremonies.
- Dōsojin (道祖神, lit. 'travelling guardian divinities') – A group of liminal kami and Buddhist gods, protectors of roads, borders, boundaries and other places of transition.
- Dojin (土神, lit. 'earth god') – Another name for any Shinto earth deity.
- Dōtaku (銅鐸, lit. 'copper bell') – Large Japanese bronze bells smelted from relatively thin bronze and richly decorated. See also bonshō, rin, and suzu.

== E ==
- Ebisu (恵比須, 恵比寿, 夷, 戎) – The kami of prosperity found at both temples and shrines. One of the Seven Lucky Gods.
- Eboshi (烏帽子, lit. 'raven (black) hat') – A type of pointed hat originally worn by Heian era aristocrats and samurai. Worn by Kannushi as formalwear for occasions such as festivals and weddings. See also kanmuri and kazaori eboshi.
- Eirei (英霊) – The spirit or ghost of a warrior/soldier who fell in battle.
- Ema* (絵馬, lit. 'picture horse') – Small wooden plaques on which worshippers at shrines, as well as Buddhist temples, write their prayers or wishes.
- Engimono (縁起物) – An umbrella term for talismans and good luck charms such as omamori and ofuda.

== F ==
- Fuji-san (富士山) – The most famous among Japan's three sacred mountains, the Three Spiritual Mountains (三霊山, Sanreizan). Mt. Fuji is inhabited by a kami called Konohanasakuya-hime.
- Fūjin (風神) – The kami of the winds who is the brother of Raijin; together, they are both said to be two of the many sons and other children of Izanagi and Izanami.
- Restoration Shinto (復古神道, Fukko shintō) – A term synonymous with kokugaku.
- Futomani (太占) – A traditional Shinto system of divination, similar to the Chinese oracle bone technique, that uses stag bones.

== G ==
- Gagaku (雅楽, lit. 'elegant music') – Ancient court music that was introduced into Japan with Buddhism from the Korean peninsula and China; now played for Shinto and Buddhist rituals and ceremonies.
- Gaki (餓鬼, lit. 'hungry ghost') – The "hungry ghost" realm of incarnation, the second-lowest realm on the wheel of reincarnation. See rinne.
- Gehōbako (外法箱, lit. 'outer path box') – A supernatural box that is used to hold Shinto paraphernalia, particular to a given jinja; such contents include dolls, animal and human skulls, and Shinto rosaries/prayer beads.
- Gi (義, lit. 'righteousness') – One of the virtues of bushido.
- Gogyo (五元) – The Five Elements.
- Gion Matsuri (祇園祭) – One of the three main annual festivals held in Kyoto, Japan (the other two being the Aoi Matsuri and the Jidai Festival). Gion Matsuri is one of the largest festivals in Japan for purification and pacification of disease-causing-entities. It takes place on 17 and 24 July.
- Giri (義理, lit. 'duty') – One of the virtues of bushido.
- Go-hei* (御幣, lit. 'great wand') – A wooden wand decorated with two shide and used in Shinto rituals as a yorishiro.
- Gokō (後光, lit. 'background light') – The Shinto-Buddhist equivalent of an aureola or halo. See also tenne.
- Gokuraku Jōdo (極楽浄土, lit. 'paradise' or 'pure land') – See jōdo.
- Gongen (権現, lit. 'Current Authority; Incarnation') – A Buddhist god that chooses to appear as a Japanese kami to take the Japanese to spiritual salvation, and a name sometimes used for shrines (e.g. "Tokusō Gongen") before the shinbutsu bunri.
- Gongen-zukuri (権現造) – A shrine structure in which the haiden, the heiden and the honden are connected under the same roof in the shape of an H.* See also Ishi-no-ma-zukuri.
- Goryō (御霊, lit. 'honourable soul') – A soul, angry for having died violently or unhappy, which needs to be pacified through Buddhist rites or enshrinement, like Sugawara no Michizane; vengeful Japanese ghosts from the aristocratic classes, especially those who have been martyred.
- Gosekku (五節句, lit. 'five seasonal festivals') – The five annual cultural festivals that were traditionally held in the Japanese imperial court. The Gosekku were originally adapted from Chinese practices and first celebrated in Japan in the Nara period in the 8th–10th centuries CE. The festivals were held until the beginning of the Meiji era.
- Gozu-tennō (牛頭天王) – Buddhist name of Susanoo, considered an avatar of Bhaisajyaguru.
- Gozu and Mezu (牛頭, lit. 'Ox-head', and 馬頭, lit. 'Horse-head') – In Shinto-Buddhism, Gozu and Mezu are the Japanese names for Niútóu and Mǎmiàn, two guardians of the underworld in Chinese and Shinto-Buddhist mythology. Both have the bodies of men, but Gozu has the head of an ox while Mezu has the face of a horse. They are the first beings a dead soul encounters upon entering Jigoku; in many stories they directly escort the newly dead to the underworld.
- -gū (宮, lit. 'shrine, temple') – A suffix of some shrine names indicating it enshrines a member of the imperial family. Hachiman-gū shrines, for instance, enshrine Emperor Ōjin.
- Gunbai (軍配, lit. 'army positioning') – An item associated with leadership and ceremonial significance, back in Ancient Japan; wielded by royalty, aristocracy, daimyo, military leaders, and kannushi; nowadays used by umpires in sumo.

== H ==
- Hachiman (八幡神, lit. 'Eight Banners Divinity') – A syncretic tutelary kami of the warrior class. First enshrined at Usa Hachiman-gū, it consists of three separate figures: Emperor Ōjin, his mother, and his wife Himegami.
- Hachiman-zukuri (八幡造, lit. 'Hachiman architecture') – Shinto architectural style in which two parallel structures with gabled roofs are connecting on the non-gabled side forming a single building which, when seen from the side, gives the impression of two.
- Hagoromo (羽衣, lit. 'Feather[ed] Raiment') – The stole-like, feathered, heavenly kimono or mantle of tennin (see below), spiritual beings found in Japanese Shinto-Buddhism; hagoromo allowed the tennin wearing them to fly.
- Haiden (拝殿, lit. 'Hall of Prayer') – A shrine building dedicated to prayer, and the only one of a shrine open to laity.
- Hakama (袴) – A type of traditional Japanese clothing; originally inspired from kù (simplified Chinese: 裤; traditional Chinese: 褲), trousers used by the Chinese imperial court in the Sui and Tang dynasties. This style was adopted by the Japanese in the form of the hakama, beginning in the sixth century.
- Haku (魄) – Stemming from Taoism, haku is the complement of kon, and is the life force that is attached to the body, and returns to the earth after death.
- Hakurei (魄霊) – The soul or spirit of a person who has usually just died.
- Hakusan – Collective name given to three mountains worshiped as kami and sacred to the Shugendō. Hakusan shrines are common all over Japan.
- Hamaya (破魔矢, lit. 'evil-banishing arrow') – Decorative arrows bought for good luck at Shinto shrines at New Year's and kept at home all year.
- Hama Yumi (破魔弓, lit. 'evil-banishing bow') – A sacred bow.
- Han-honji suijaku (本地垂迹) – A theory conceived by Yoshida Kanetomo which reversed the standard honji suijaku theory, asserting Buddhist gods were avatars of Japanese kami.
- Hanagasa (花笠) – A flowered-hat worn by miko during festivals.
- Hannya (般若, lit. 'Prajñā') – A female yōkai found in Japanese folklore (and in kagura and Noh), and is most often described as a monstrous oni of a female; a hannya is a yōkai who was originally once a normal mortal human woman, but one who has become so overcome with her jealousy that it has metaphorically consumed her, followed by literally transforming her.
- Harae (祓, lit. 'purification') – General term for rituals of purification in Shinto. Methods of purification include misogi.
- Haraedo (祓戸, lit. 'place of purification') – A place where ritual purification is performed.
- Haraedo-no-Kami (祓戸の神) – Kami of purification. Amongst the many kami born when Izanagi performed misogi in order to cleanse the netherworld filth on him after he had returned from his futile attempt to retrieve his late consort, Izanami.
- Haraegushi (祓串, lit. 'purification wand') – an ōnusa having a hexagonal or octagonal wand.
- Hassoku-an (八足案, lit. 'eight-legged table') – See an.
- Hatsumōde (初詣, lit. 'first accomplishment') – The first shrine visit of the New Year.
- Hatsuhinode (初日の出, lit. 'First Rising of the Sun') – The first sunrise of the New Year.
- Hatsuyume (初夢, lit. 'first dream') – The first dream that a person has in the New Year. In Shinto, it is believed that the subjects of the first dreams of the year are representative of what one's upcoming year will be like.
- Heiden (火産霊, lit. 'fireborn spirit') – A section of a shrine where offerings are presented to the gods.
- Heihaku (幣帛) – See also go-hei.
- Heishi (瓶子, lit. 'vase') – Small bottles used for holding offerings, such as sake; numbered amongst the shingu for holding offerings.
- Himorogi (神籬, lit. 'divine fence') – Temporary sacred spaces or altars used to worship. Himorogi are usually areas demarcated with green bamboo or sakaki at the four corners supporting shimenawa.
- Hinamatsuri (雛祭り, lit. 'girls' festival') – A ceremony held on 3 March, celebrating the women of Japan, as well as expressing wishes for their continued good health. Originally celebrated as the "Peach Festival", it became known as Hina-Matsuri during the reign of Empress Meishō.
- Hi-no-tama (火の玉, lit. 'balls of fire') – Fireballs whose presence indicate supernatural activity.
- Hiōgi (檜扇, lit. 'cypress fan') – A fan used originally by Heian aristocrats, and today by Shinto priests in formal settings. See also akomeôgi (above)
- Hirairi (平入) – A style of construction in which the building has its main entrance on the side that runs parallel to the roof's ridge (non gabled-side). The shinmei-zukuri, nagare-zukuri, hachiman-zukuri, and hie-zukuri styles belong to this type.
- Hirazara (平皿, lit. 'flat plate') – Numbered amongst the shingu (tools used in shrine altars and home altars) for holding offerings, specifically one for holding rice and one for holding salt.
- Hitobashira (人柱, lit. 'human pillar') – A human sacrifice, buried alive under or near large-scale buildings like dams, bridges and castles. Hitobashira can also refer to workers who were buried alive under inhumane conditions.
- Hitodama (人魂, lit. 'human soul') – The wayward soul of a human being who has already died.
- Hitorigami (独神, lit. 'monad kami') – Shinto kami who came into being alone, as opposed to those who came into being as male-female pairs.
- Hōhei/hōbei (奉幣, lit. 'money offering') – Offerings made to a kami, usually consisting in heihaku, but sometimes of jewels, money, weapons or other objects.
- Hokosaki Suzu (鉾先鈴, lit. 'Halberd Bell') – Similar to a Kagura Suzu, a Hokosaki Suzu is a set of several bells on a short-staff.
- Hōko (這子, lit. 'crawling child') – A soft-bodied doll given to young women of age and pregnant women in Japan as an amulet to protect both the new mother and the unborn child.
- Hokora/hokuraman (祠 or 神庫) – An extremely small shrine. One of the earliest words for shrine.
- Ho-musubi (火産霊) – Another name for Kagutsuchi.
- Honden (本殿, lit. 'main hall') – Also called shinden (神殿) ("divine hall"), the honden is the most sacred building of a shrine, intended for the exclusive use of the enshrined kami.
- Honji suijaku (本地垂迹) – A theory dominant for centuries in Japan according to which Japanese kami are local manifestations of Indian gods.
- Hongū (本宮, lit. 'main shrine') – Located only within a jingū, the main shrine enshrining the principal kami, as opposed to betsugū, sessha or massha. The term includes haiden, heiden and honden. See also honsha.
- Honsha (本社) – The main shrine of a shrine complex. It is followed hierarchically by sessha and massha.
- Hōsōshi (方相氏) – An obsolete term for the role driving away devils at a religious ceremony, or the driver of the hearse carrying the coffin of a deceased emperor, back in ancient Japan; a ritual exorcist fulfilling a role in a funeral, called tsuina (see below). Originally a Tang dynasty Chinese custom, later adopted by the Japanese during the Heian period.
- Hotoke (仏, lit. 'Buddha') – A term meaning either Buddha or dead soul. While Buddhist in origin, the term is used in the second sense by all Japanese religions.
- Hyakudoishi (百度石, lit. 'hundred-times stone') – Sometimes present as a point of reference for the hyakudomairi near the entrance of a shrine or Buddhist temple.
- Hyakudomairi (百度参り, lit. 'hundred-times visits') – A worshipper with a special prayer will visit the shrine a hundred times. After praying, they must go at least back to the entrance or around a hyakudoishi for the next visit to be counted as separate.
- Hyōi (憑依, lit. 'Possession') – Possession, specifically possession by a spirit or a kami.

== Gallery: A to H ==
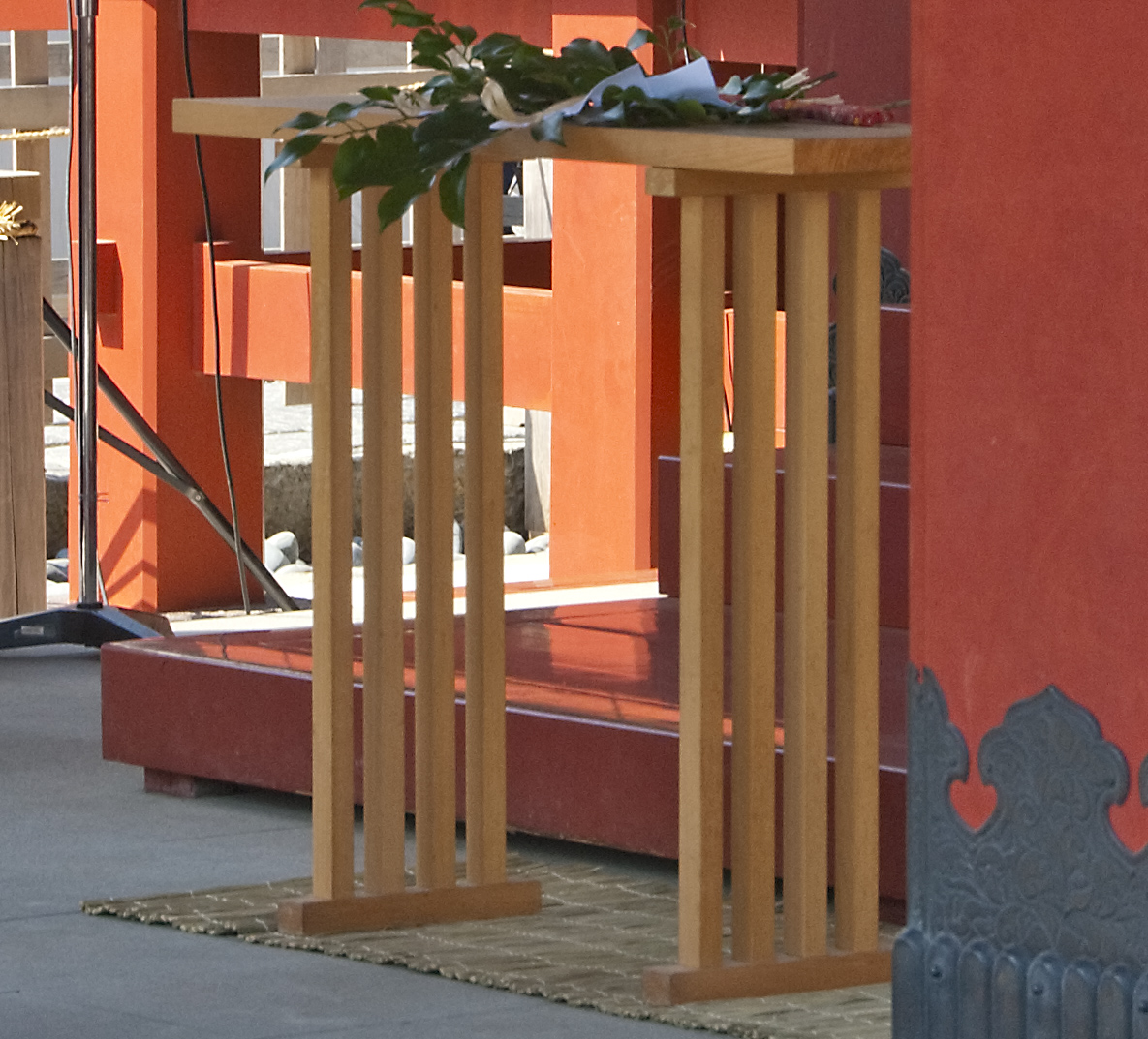
A hassoku-an

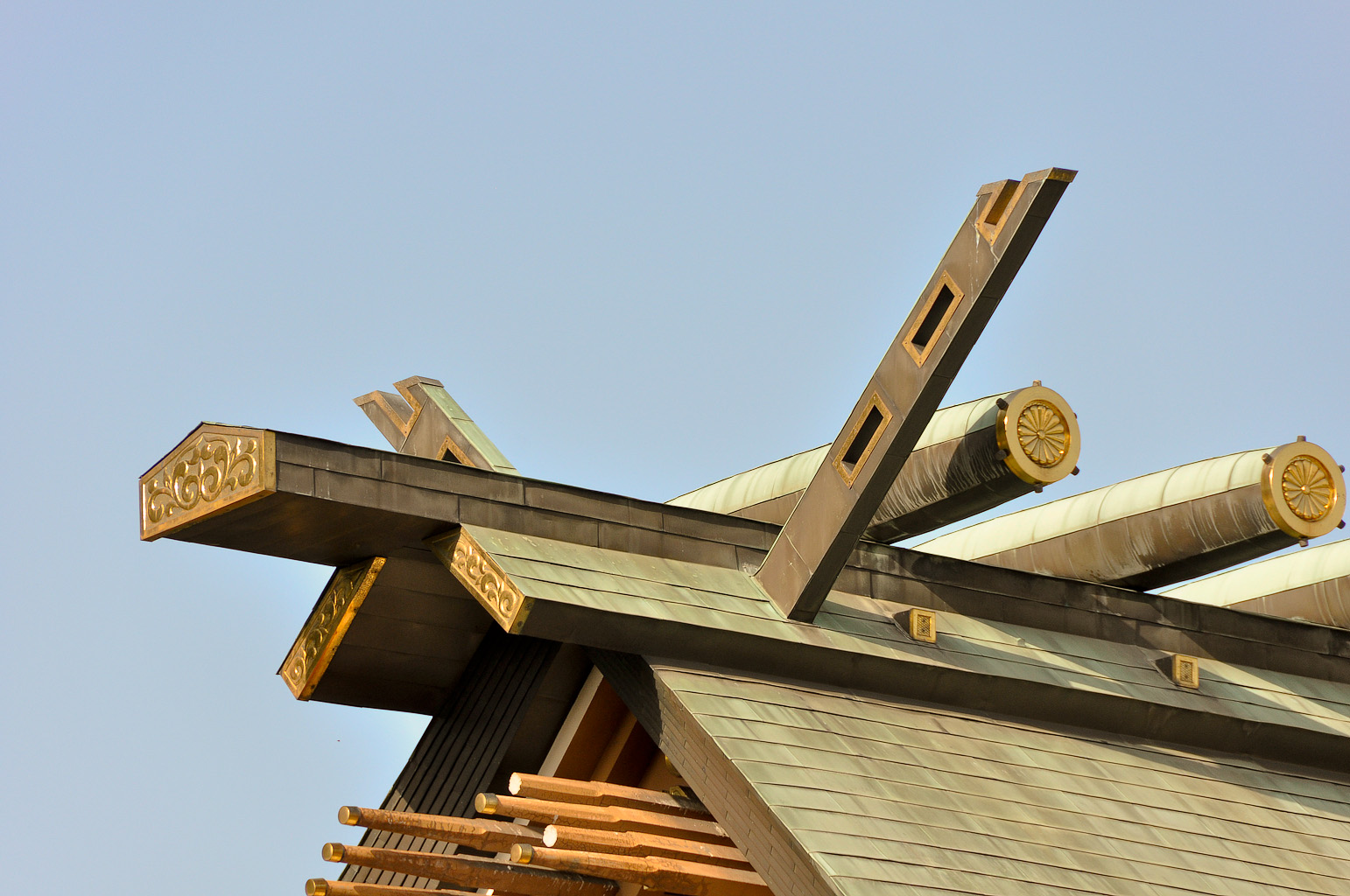
Chigi (forked decorations)

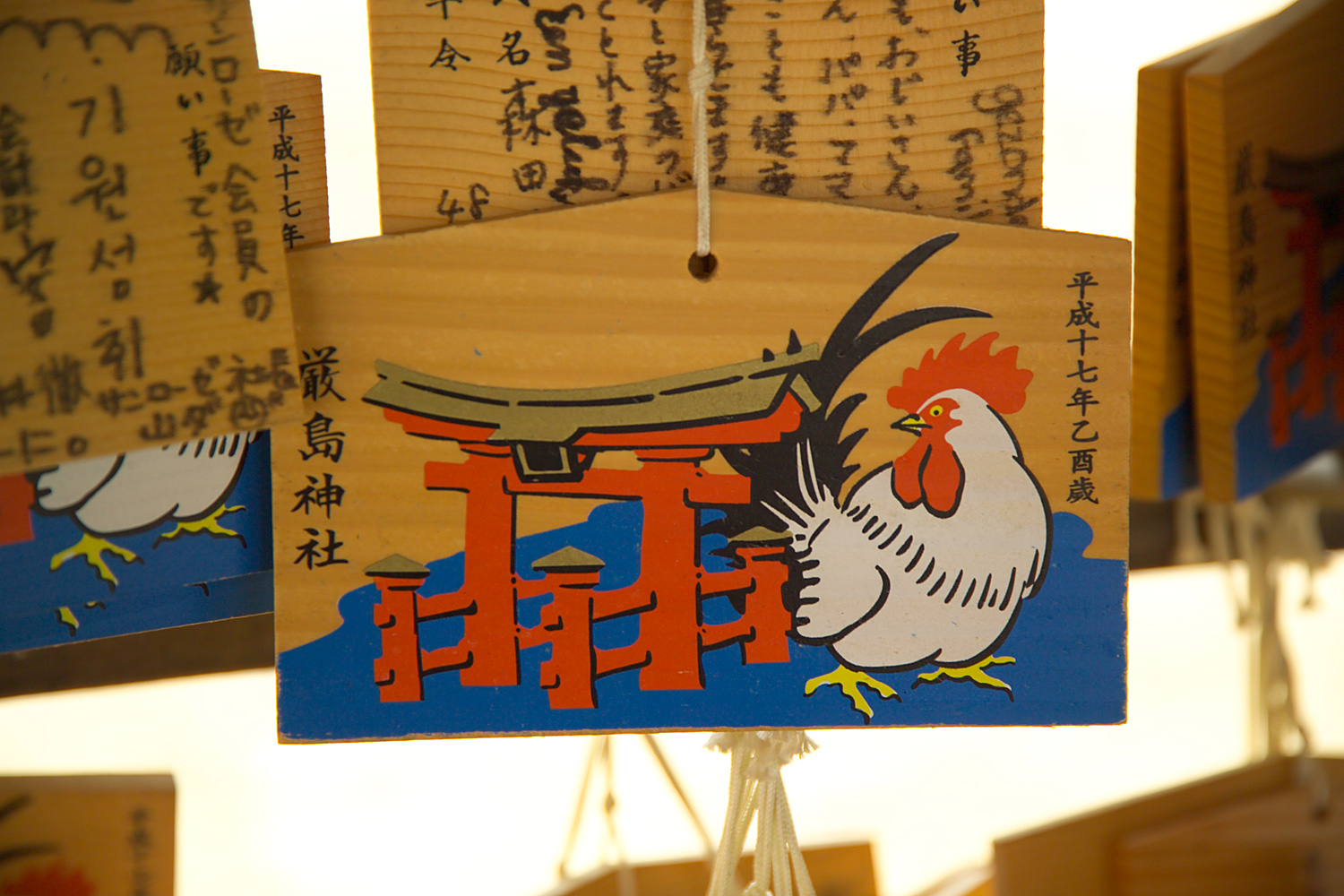
An ema

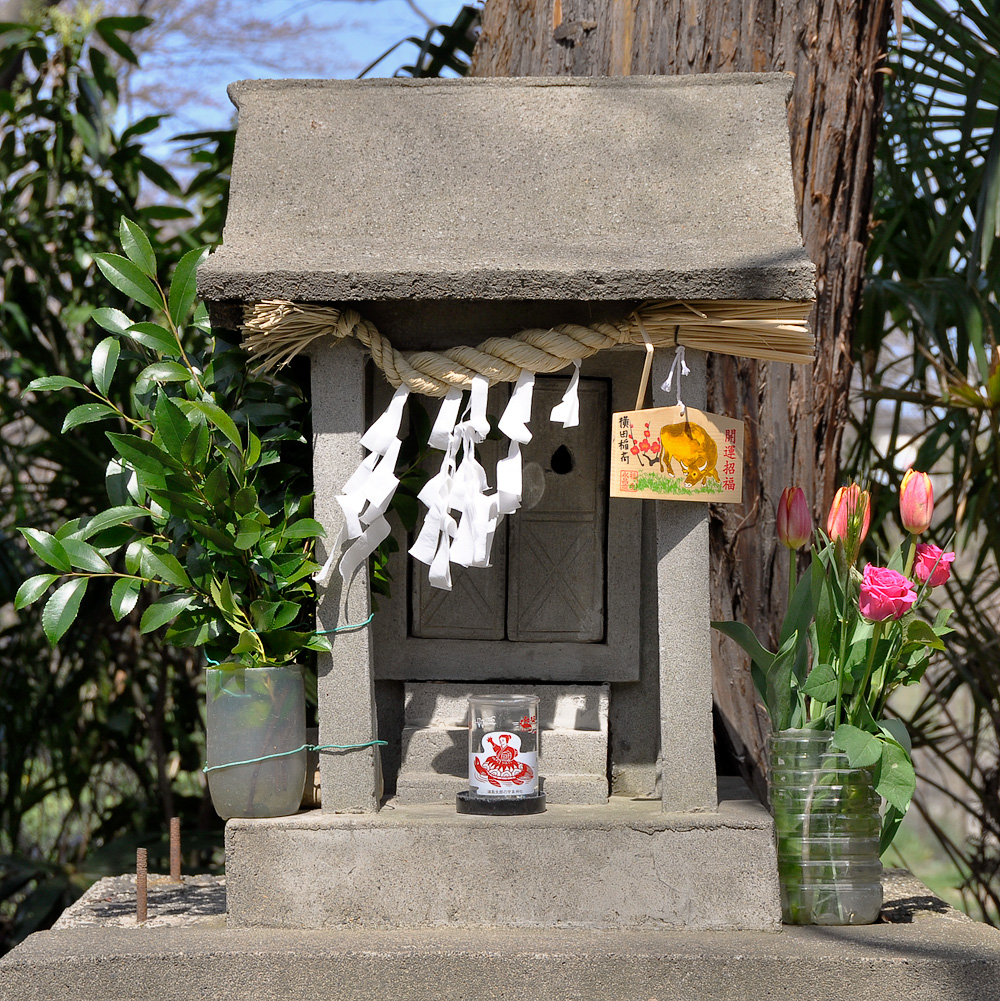
A hokora

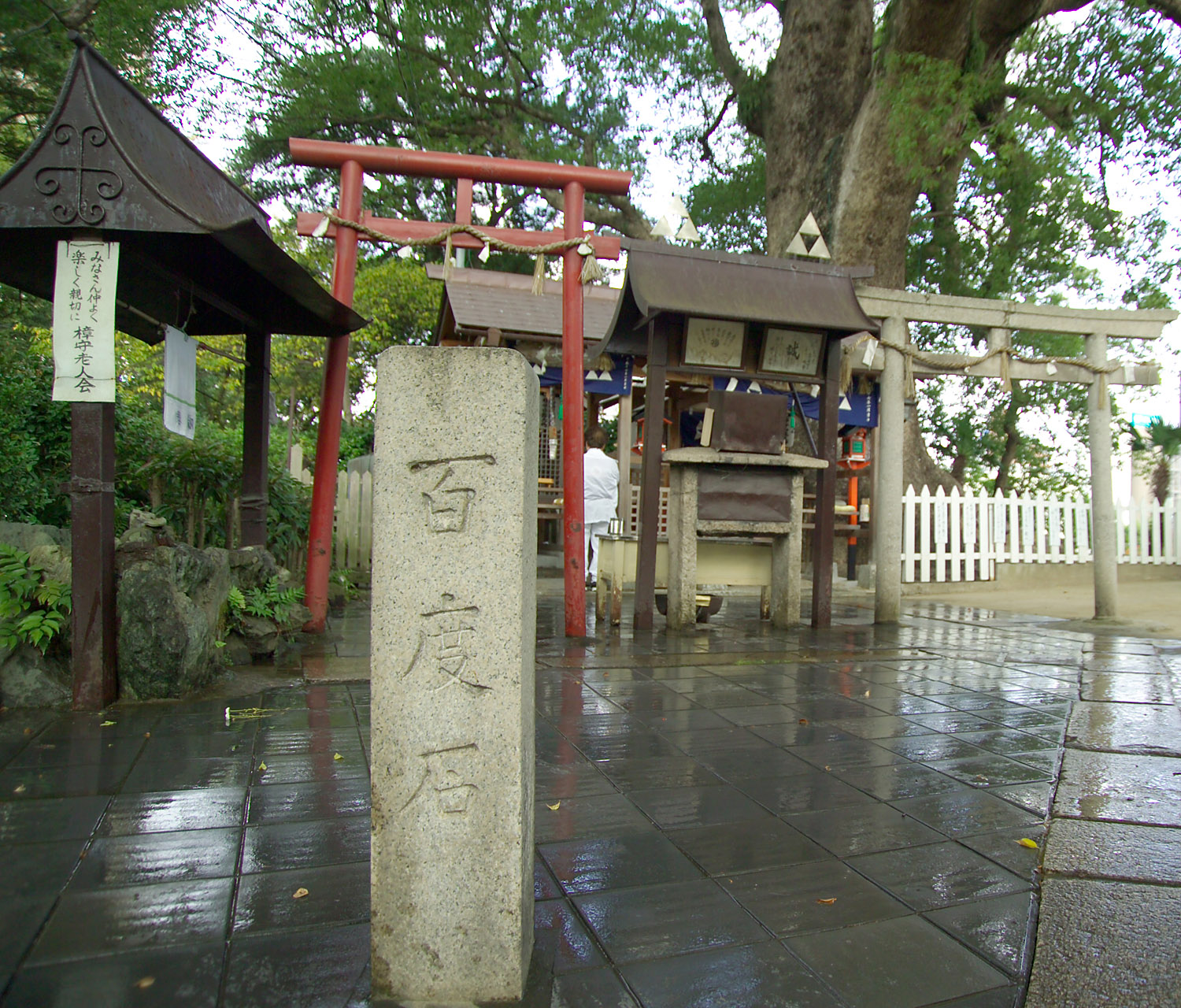
A hyakudoishi

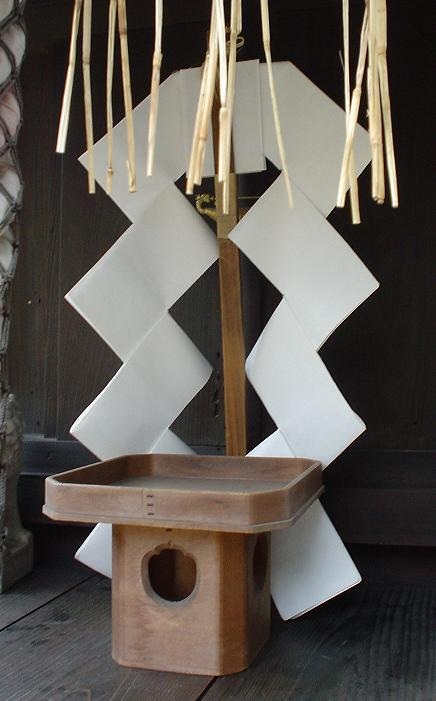
A gohei

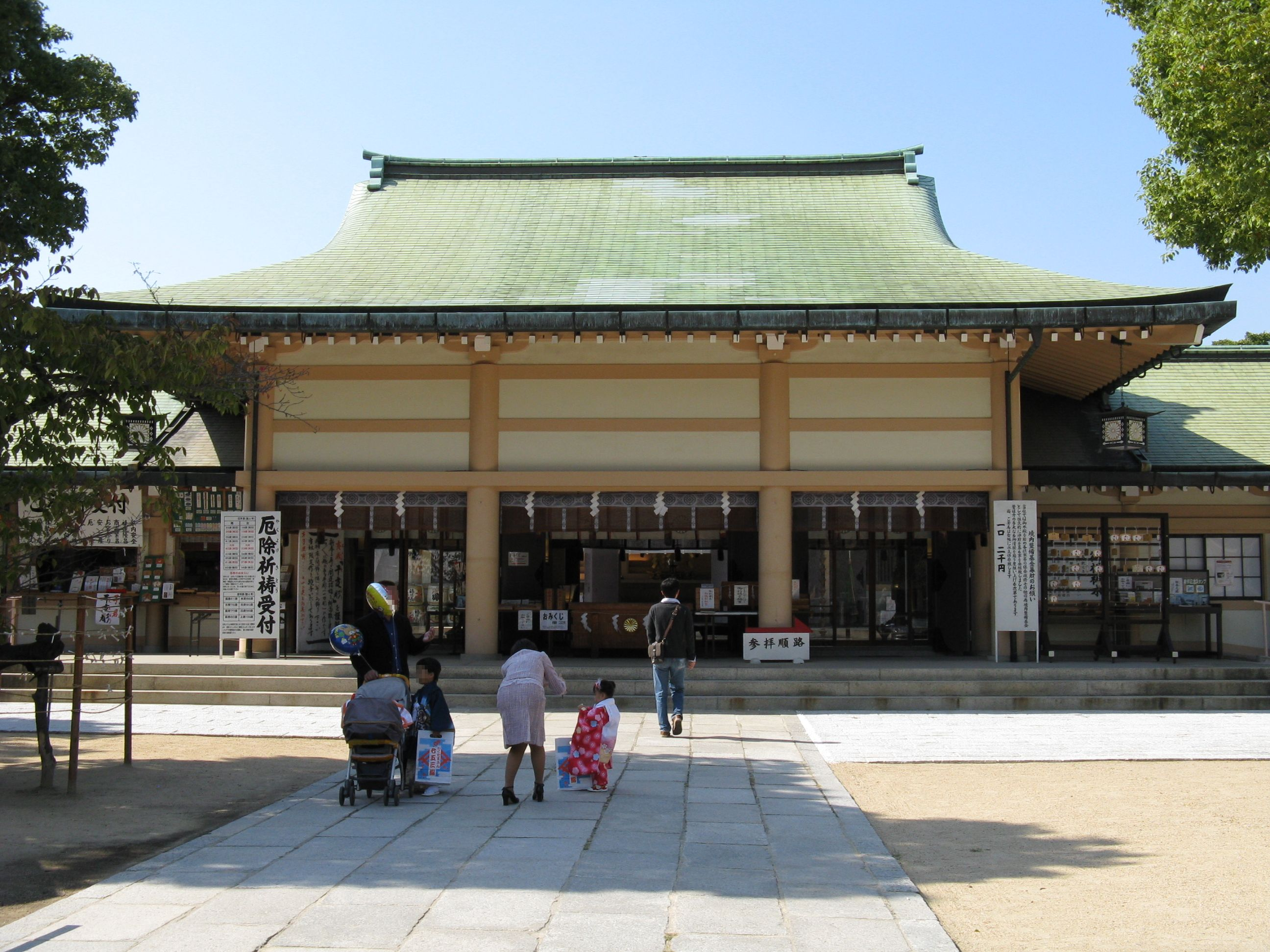
A haiden

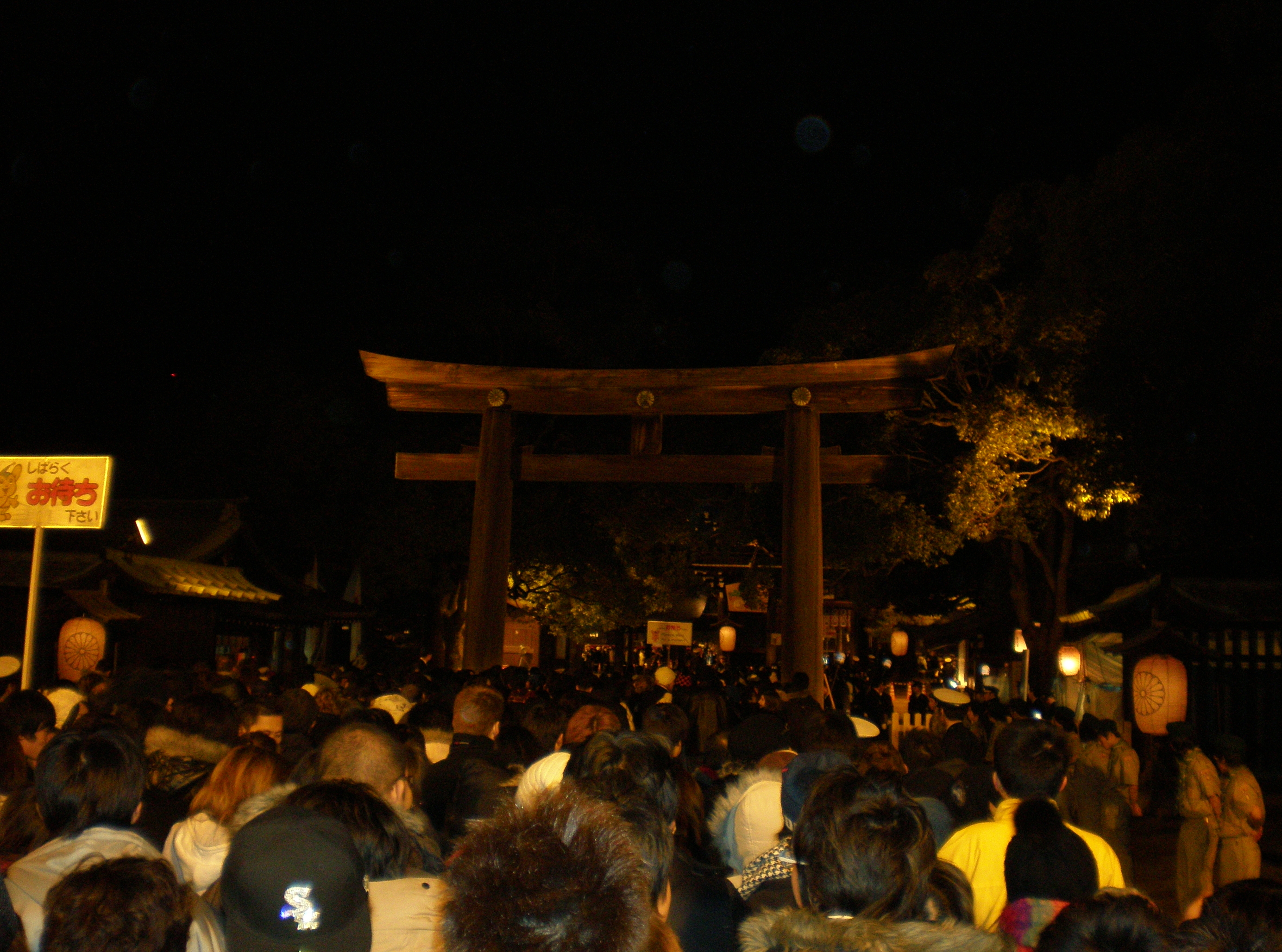
Hatsumōde at Meiji Shrine, Shibuya, Tokyo

== I ==
- Ichijama (生邪魔, lit. 'living evil spirit') – A type of curse from Okinawa; it is a type of ikiryō—-a spirit of a still-living person which leaves the body to haunt its victim. An ichijama is enacted using a special doll known as an ichijama butokii. See also Ushi no Koku Mairi.
- Ichijama Butokii (生邪魔仏, lit. 'living evil spirit image') – A doll used to enact an ichijama curse.
- Ichikishima-hime-no-mikoto (市杵島姫命) – See Benzaiten.
- Ichirei Shikon (一霊四魂, lit. 'one spirit, four souls') – A philosophy within Shinto in which one's soul consists of a whole spirit called naohi (直霊) that is connected with the heaven and the shikon: the ara-mitama, kushi-mitama, nigi-mitama, and saki-mitama.
- Ihai (位牌) – A placard used to designate the seat of a deity or past ancestor. The name of the deity or past ancestor is usually inscribed onto the tablet. With origins in traditional Chinese culture, the spirit tablet is a common sight in many East Asian countries where any form of ancestor veneration is practiced.
- Ikan (衣冠) – A set of official robes worn by aristocrats and court officials of the Heian-era court. Worn today in Shinto by a kannushi in formal costume for festivals.
- Ikiryō (生霊) – In Japanese popular belief, folklore and fiction, it refers to a disembodied spirit that leaves the body of a person who is still living and subsequently haunts other people or places, sometimes across great distances..
- Imi (忌み, lit. 'abhorrent') – Something to be avoided, particularly to a ceremony. See also kegare and tsumi.
- Imikotoba (忌み言葉, lit. 'abhorrent words') – Words to be avoided in certain occasions.
- Inari Ōkami* (稲荷大神) – The Shinto kami of fertility, rice, agriculture, foxes, industry, and worldly success. Inari's shrines can be identified by the stone foxes which adorn it.
- Ireisai (慰霊祭, lit. 'consoling spirits festival') – A festival to remember and pacify the spirits of war dead that takes place at Yasukuni Shrine and other shrines built to the purpose.
- Ise Shrine (伊勢神宮, lit. 'The Great Forces Divine Palace') – A shrine in Mie prefecture considered one of the holiest Shinto sites.
- Itako/Ichiko (神巫, 巫子 & 市子) – The blind female shamans from northwest Honshu who act as a link between human beings and kami, echoing what was probably the former role of miko in Shinto.
- Iwakura* (磐座) – A rock where a kami has been invited to descend for worship. See yorishiro.
- Izanagi (イザナギ) – The brother-husband of Izanami, Izanagi is one of the Japanese creator kami; according to the Nihongi and Kojiki, he gave birth to Japan, and is the father of Amaterasu, Tsukuyomi and Susanoo.
- Izanami (イザナミ) – The sister-wife of Izanagi. She is one of the Japanese creator kami, according to the Nihongi and Kojiki, gave birth to Japan, later dying in childbirth with her last child, Kagutsuchi, who burned her alive and sent her to the Underworld, Izanami becomes a kami of death.

== J ==
- Jaki (邪鬼, lit. 'malevolent spirits') – An oni-like creature in Japanese folklore, thought to be able to provoke a person's darkest desires. Similar to the amanojaku.
- Jama (邪魔, lit. 'malevolent demons') – A demon or devil of perversity, a hindrance to the practice of purity in Shinto and the practice of enlightenment in Buddhism.
- Jichinsai (地鎮祭, lit. 'ground-pacifying ceremony') – A ceremony held by a Shinto priest on a site before the start of construction on the behalf of owners and workers to pacify and appease local spirits.
- Jidai Matsuri (時代祭, lit. the "festival of the ages") – One of the three main annual festivals held in Kyoto, Japan (the other two being the Aoi Matsuri and the Gion Festival). It is held on October 22 every year.
- Jigoku (地獄, lit. 'earth prison') – The Shinto-Buddhist version of Hell (the Japanese name for Diyu). Similar to the Nine Rings of Hell in Dante's Inferno, Jigoku has eight levels.
- Jikininki (食人鬼, lit. 'human-eating ghost') – In Japanese Buddhism, jikininki are the spirits of greedy, selfish, or impious individuals who are cursed after death to seek out and eat human corpses. See also gaki.
- Jin (仁, lit. 'benevolence') – One of the virtues of bushido.
- Jingikan (神祇官, lit. 'Divine Land Spirits Governmental Office') – In the ritsuryō system, the part of government responsible for festivals.
- Jingū (神宮, lit. 'Divine Palace/Shrine') – A shrine enshrining a member of the Imperial family, like Meiji Jingū, which enshrines the deified spirits of Emperor Meiji and Empress Shōken.
- Jingū-ji (神宮寺) – A temple whose existence is supposed to help the soul of the kami the shrine next to it enshrines.
- Jinja* (神社) – The most general name for a shrine.
- Jinja-bukkaku (神社) – Shinto shrines and Buddhist temples, especially a combined shrine/temple complex.
- Jinja-fukkyū (神社復旧) – A reversal of the Meiji period's jinja gappei. Not to be confused with jinja fukushi.
- Jinja-fukushi (神社福祉) – A form of unofficial and illegal restoration of a merged shrine. See jinja-gappei.
- Jinja-gappei (神社合併) – A policy begun in the early 1900s, when half the shrines were merged with the remainder and disappeared.
- Jinja-honchō (神社本庁) – Also known as the Association of Shinto Shrines, it is a group that includes most of the Shinto shrines in Japan.
- Jinja-kaikan (神社会館) – A hotel-like building inside large shrines used for weddings.
- Jinja-shinto (神社神道) – Originally a synonym of State Shinto (Kokka Shinto below), it is now a term criticized by specialists as problematic. When applied to post-war Shinto, it means the beliefs and practices associated to shrines, particularly those associated with the Association of Shinto Shrines.
- Jisei (自制, lit. 'self-restraint') – One of the virtues of bushido.
- Jisha (寺社) – A temple's tutelary shrine. See also chinjusha (above) and jinja-bukkaku.
- Jōe (浄衣, lit. 'pure robes') – A formal over-garment worn by kannushi during religious ceremonies; a silk kariginu.
- Jōtō (上棟, "Raising the Roof") – A Shinto ceremony held when raising the main beam that forms the ridge of the roof.
- Junpai (巡拝, lit. 'patrol route') – The custom of visiting a fixed series of 33 or 88 shrines or temples, or shrines-&-temples.
- Junrei (巡礼, lit. 'patrol etiquette') – The term most commonly used for either of two major types of pilgrimages in Japan, in accordance with Buddhism or Shinto. These pilgrimages can be made as a visit to a group of temples, shrines, or other holy sites, in a particular order, often in a circuit of 33 or 88 sites.

== K ==
- Kabura-ya (鏑矢, lit. 'turnip arrow') – In Shinto, the sound made by the kabura-ya in mid-flight is thought to ward-off evil influences; like the hamaya, the kabura-ya is used in Shinto cleansing rites of sites, shrine grounds, and parks.
- Kabuto (冑 or 兜, lit. 'helmet') – A helmet—complete with a suit of armour—sometimes dedicated to shrines, and indicative of a kami's power to ward-off and protect from negative influences.
- Kadomatsu (門松, lit. 'pine gateposts') – New Year decorations placed in pairs in front of homes to welcome the kami of the harvest.
- Kagami (鏡, lit. 'mirror') – Often used in Shinto worship; originally bronze mirrors were used (see also shinkyō), having been introduced to Japan from China; the most famous example of mirrors in Shinto is the Yata no Kagami.
- Kagami (火神, lit. 'fire deity') – Another name for Kagatsuchi.
- Kagome crest (籠目紋, lit. 'lattice eye crest') – An apotropaic mark, specifically hexagrams and octagrams featured in Shinto shrines, including the Ise Grand Shrine, to ward off negative and malevolent influences and evil spirits.
- Kagura (神楽, lit. 'divine entertainment') – A type of Shinto dance with deep ties to the Emperor and his family, accompanied by instruments, which is also called mikagura (御神楽). It is also a type of Shinto dance performed at shrines during religious rites, and is also called satokagura (里神楽).
- Kagura-den (神楽殿, lit. 'divine entertainment platform') – a pavilion or stage dedicated to the performing of the kagura. Also called maidono or buden (舞殿).
- Kagura suzu (神楽鈴, lit. 'divine entertainment bells') – a set of twelve bells used in kagura.
- Kagari-bi (篝火) – Candle holders, also called rōsoku-tate (ローソク立, lit. 'Candle Holders'). They are designed for burning tiny white candles that are lit whenever one visits the kamidana for prayers. Some people use little electric lanterns instead of candles.
- Kagutsuchi (迦具土) – The Shinto fire god and patron deity of blacksmiths and ceramic workers.
- Kajishin (鍛冶神, lit. 'forge deity') – A divinity of the blacksmith's forge.
- Kakue (格衣) – A traditional overcoat-robe worn by Shinto monks.
- Kakuremi (隠身, lit. 'concealed form') – A term for a hidden form, invisible form; metaphysical form (of a deity). Also known as kakurimi.
- Kakuriyo (隠り世, lit. 'hidden world') – Refers to the worlds of kami and the dead.
- Kamado-gami (竃神, lit. 'kitchen deity') a kami which lives in people's ovens.
- Kamakura (かまくら or カマクラ, lit. 'warehouse'):
  - A winter festival in Akita Prefecture, in mid-January/February, during which children get to play in quinzhee-like snow huts.
  - The quinzhee-like snow huts made for children during the winter festival of the same-name, in mid-January/February, in Akita Prefecture.
- Kamakura Daimyojin (鎌倉大明神, lit. 'Warehouse Great Light Kami'): A Shinto Kami in Akita Prefecture revered during the Kamakura festival. See also Suijin.
- Kami (神, lit. 'Spirit, God, Deity, Divinity') – A term broadly meaning spirit or deity, but has several separate meanings:
  - deities mentioned in Japanese mythologies and local deities protecting areas, villages and families.
  - unnamed and non-anthropomorphic spirits found in natural phenomena.
  - a general sense of sacred power.
  - according to Motoori Norinaga, a kami is "any thing or phenomenon that produces the emotions of fear and awe, with no distinction between good and evil".
- Kamiarizuki (神有月) – A lunar calendar month corresponding roughly to October. Because it is believed that in that month all kami go to Izumo Taisha, it is called "month with gods" in Izumo. See also Kannazuki.
- Kamidana* (神棚, lit. 'Kami Shelf') – A miniature shrine placed or hung high on a wall in some Japanese homes.
- Kamikakushi (神隠し) – A term used to refer to the mysterious disappearance or death of a person that happens when an angered god takes a person away. Japanese folklore contains numerous tales of humans abducted to the spirit world by kami. See also tengu-kakushi.
- Kamikaze (神風, lit. 'divine wind') – The two major typhoons that dispersed Mongol-Koryo fleets who invaded Japan under Kublai Khan in 1274.
- Kamimukae (神迎え) – The first part of a typical festival. The spirit is usually invited to a himorogi.
- Kanai Anzen (家内安全) – A specific kind of omamori meant to safeguard the safety of one's family.
- Kanayago (金屋子神) – a god of blacksmiths, mainly in Chugoku Region (Shintoism).
- Kanjō (勧請) – A process through which a kami is transferred to a new shrine. See also bunrei.
- Kanju (干珠) – One of two magical gems that Ryūjin used to control the tides; its counterpart is the Manju.
- Kansan (汗衫) – A thin jacket for girls of the aristocracy of the Heian period. Now worn by miko in formal attire for ceremonies and festivals.
- Kanmuri (冠) – A formal traditional headdress worn by the Japanese emperor and by aristocratic men of the Heian period when formally dressed. Today, it in worn in Shinto by a kannushi in formal costume for formal ceremonies and festivals.
- Kannagara (惟神) – Another word for Shinto.
- Kannagara no Michi (惟神の道, lit. the "Way of the Kami") – Another name for Shinto used before World War II.
- Kannazuki (神無月) – See also Kamiarizuki.
- Kannushi* (神主) – A Shinto priest who is a master of shrine ceremonies, rituals, and festivals.
- Kariginu (狩衣, lit. 'hunting robes') – A style of cloak, originally the costume that Heian-era nobles wore when they went out hunting, which became the nobles' daily casual clothes. Worn today in Shinto by a kannushi in formal costume for rituals, ceremonies and festivals.
- Kasoegi (斗木) – See also katsuogi.
- Kasuga (春日, lit. 'springtime sun') – The tutelary kami (ujigami) of the entire Yamato province.
- Kasuga-zukuri (春日造) – The architectural style of Kasuga-taisha.
- Katana (刀, lit. 'blade') – A sword, sometimes dedicated to shrines (along with other weapons, such as naginata and spears), and indicative of a kami's power to ward off negative influences.
- Katashiro (形代, model substitute) – A traditional Japanese doll, made of materials like paper or straw, used in certain purification rituals, used as a substitute for a person, as the target for a prayer or curse cast against them.
- Katsuogi* (鰹木, 勝男木, 葛緒木) – A style of short decorative poles on a shrine's roof set at a right angle to the roof's ridgepole. See also kasoegi.
- Kawaya-no-Kami (厠の神, lit. 'latrine deity') – The kami of latrines, toilets, waterclosets, and feces.
- Kazaori Eboshi (風折烏帽子) – A type of pointed hat originally worn by Heian-era aristocrats and samurai. It is now worn by kannushi as formalwear for occasions such as festivals and weddings.
- Kekkai (結界, lit. 'Fastened-off World') – a restriction in access to a specific area, barred-off often for the purposes of training &/or purification in esoteric Buddhism (and Hinduism).
- Kenkai (見界, lit. 'visible world') – The world that one can see without any kind of supernatural gift; the world of the living.
- Kenkon (乾坤) – A term used to refer to the union of opposites.
- Kenzokushin (眷属神, lit. 'household ancillary/domestic deities') – A type of lesser kami or yōkai who serves a higher-ranked kami or yōkai.
- Ki (氣 or 気) – A vital force forming part of any living entity. See also haku.
- Kijo (鬼女) – An oni woman from Japanese legends. See also onibabā (below) and yama-uba (below).
- Kimon (鬼門) – Based on the assignment of the twelve zodiac animals to the cardinal directions, the direction of northeast, known as the direction of ushi-tora (丑寅, lit. 'Ox-Tiger'), is also-known-as the direction of Kimon; one theory is that the oni's cowlike horns and tigerskin loincloth developed as a visual depiction of this term. According to Taoism and esoteric onmyōdō, the northeasterly direction is considered an unlucky direction through which evil spirits pass, and, as-such, is termed as Kimon; having to travel in this direction was seen as a bad omen for a journey.
- Kegare (穢れ, lit. 'impurity') – defilement due to natural phenomena, for example the contact with dead bodies. The opposite of kegare is kiyomi. See also imi (above) and tsumi (below).
- Kibitsu-zukuri (吉備津造) – The architectural style of Kibitsu Shrine in Okayama prefecture, characterized by a huge honden divided in three parts with an interior painted in vermilion, black and gold.
- Kigen (寄絃) – A ritual (i.e. during shihobarai) of banishing evil spirits and other negative influences, which can be achieved by the strumming of bows, such as a hama yumi and an azusa yumi.
- Kirin (麒麟) – A mythical creature in Asian mythology; in Shinto, the kirin are considered messengers of the kami.
- Kisshōten (吉祥天, lit. 'Auspicious Heavens') – A Japanese goddess of good fortune, wealth and prosperity. Adapted, via Buddhism, from the Hindu goddess Lakshmi. Kisshōten is sometimes named as one of the Seven Gods of Fortune, replacing either Jurōjin or Fukurokuju.
- Kitsune* (狐, lit. 'fox') – Animal believed to have magical powers and to be a messenger to Inari. Inari shrines are always protected by statues of foxes, sometimes wearing red votive bibs.
- Kitsunebi (狐火, lit. 'fox fire') – The atmospheric ghost lights mentioned in legends all across Japan outside Okinawa Prefecture.
- Kitsune no yomeiri (狐の嫁入り, lit. 'fox wedding') – The kitsune no yomeiri can refer to several things: atmospheric ghost lights; a sunshower; and various strange wedding processions that can be seen in classical Japanese kaidan, essays, and legends. The kitsune-no-yomeiri is always closely related to foxes.
- Kiyome (清, lit. 'purity') – The concept of purity within Shinto, the state in which all beings start-out as at birth, and can return to again by undergoing acts of harae, such as misogi. The opposite of kiyomi is kegare.
- Kō (孝, lit. 'Filial piety') – One of the virtues of bushido.
- Kō (講, lit. 'lecture') – A lay worship group focusing on a particular kami or sacred location which may perform pilgrimages and other rites.
- Koban (小判, lit. 'small ingot') – Originally currency in the Edo period. In modern times, they are sold as engimono from Shinto shrines, or, at-least, symbolically, gold-foil cardboard versions are given in the place of the solid-gold ingots, particularly as decorations for a kumade, both attained from Shinto shrines for good fortune in business.
- Kōdō (皇道, lit. the "Imperial Way") – Shinto as defined by post-Meiji nationalist.
- Kogakkan University (皇学館大学) – A university located near Ise Shrine that is one of two universities authorized to train Shinto priests.
- Kojiki (古事記, lit. 'Records of Ancient Matters' or 'An Account of Ancient Matters') – An early Japanese written chronicle of myths, legends, songs, genealogies, oral traditions, and semi-historical accounts down to 711–712 AD. Similar to the Nihon Shoki.
- Kokka Shinto (国家神道, lit. 'State Shinto') – Japanese translation of the English term State Shinto created in 1945 by the US occupation forces to define the post-Meiji religious system in Japan.
- Kokoro (心, lit. 'heart') – The essence of a thing or being.
- Kokugakuin Daigaku (國學院大學) – Tokyo university that is one of two authorized to train Shinto priests.
- Kokujō Jigoku (黒縄地獄, lit. 'hell of black rope') – The second level of Jigoku, where sinners, who have committed murder and theft are.
- Komainu* (狛犬) – Stone warden maned-dogs usually present at the entrance of a shrine.
- Kon (魂, lit. 'soul') – Stemming from Taoism, kon is the part of the soul that goes to heaven and is able to leave the body, carrying with it an appearance of physical form; the subliminal self. See also tamashii.
- Konaoshi (小直衣) – Attire of the Heian court, now worn by kannushi in formal functions.
- Kongōsho (金剛杵) – A ritual weapon, resembling a yawara and a vajra-mushti.
- Konjin (金神) – An itinerant kami from onmyōdō. Konjin is associated with compass directions, and said to change position with the year, lunar month, and season.
- Kono-yo (この世, lit. 'this world') – See busshitsukai.
- Konpaku (魂魄) – Every living human has both a kon and a haku.
- Kome (米, lit. 'Rice') – Offerings of white rice made at Shinto shrines and a household's kamidana. See also ō-kome.
- Kotoamatsukami (別天神) – The collective name for the first Kami which came into existence at the time of the creation of the universe, according to the Kokiji. They were came into being up in Takamagahara at the time of creation. Unlike later gods, these deities were born without any procreation. See also Amatsukami (above).
- Kuchiyose miko (口寄巫女, lit. 'channelling miko') – A miko acting as a spirit medium.
- Kuebiko (久延毘古) – A Shinto kami of local knowledge and agriculture, represented in Japanese mythology as a scarecrow, who cannot walk but has comprehensive self-awareness and omniscience.
- Kuji-in (九字印, lit. 'Nine Hand Seals') – A system of mudras and associated mantras that consist of nine syllables.
- Kuji-kiri (九字切り, lit. 'Nine Symbolic Cuts') – A system of mudras and associated mantras that consist of nine syllables, based on Kuji-in.
- Kumade (熊手, lit. 'bear hand') – A rake; a smaller, handheld, decorated version is sold as an engimono and is believed to be able to, literally, rake-in good-fortune &/or rake-out bad-fortune for the user.
- Kumo (雲, lit. 'cloud') – Synonymous with heaven; in the event that a household kamidana cannot be installed in the highest point of the house, the Kanji for 'Cloud' is written on a piece of paper and affixed above the kamidana; doing this lets the kami know that, while they should be enshrined at the highest point, circumstances prevent this from being-so.
- Kunitokotachi-no-mikoto (国之常立神) – A kami considered to be the most important by Yoshida Kanetomo and considered important also by Watarai Shinto.
- Kunitsu tsumi (国津罪/国つ罪) – A term for tsumi specifically committed on Earth. The corresponding concept is amatsu tsumi.
- Kushi-mitama (奇魂) – The wise and experienced side of a mitama. The kushi-mitama is associated with the colours blue and green, and with the cardinal direction of east.
- Kusudama (薬玉, lit. 'medicine ball') – Originating from ancient Japanese culture, kusudama were used for incense and potpourri; possibly originally being actual bunches of flowers or herbs. They are now typically used as decorations or as gifts.
- Kuwabara kuwabara (桑原桑原, lit. 'mulberry field') – A phrase used in the Japanese language to ward off lightning. It is analogous to the English phrase "knock on wood" to prevent bad luck.
- Kyōha Shinto (教派神道, lit. 'sect Shinto') – A label applied to certain sects by the Meiji government to give them an official status.
- Kyōkan Jigoku (叫喚地獄, lit. 'Hell of Screaming') – The fourth level of Jigoku, where sinners, who have committed murder, theft, degeneration, and drunkenness are sent.

== Gallery: I to K ==
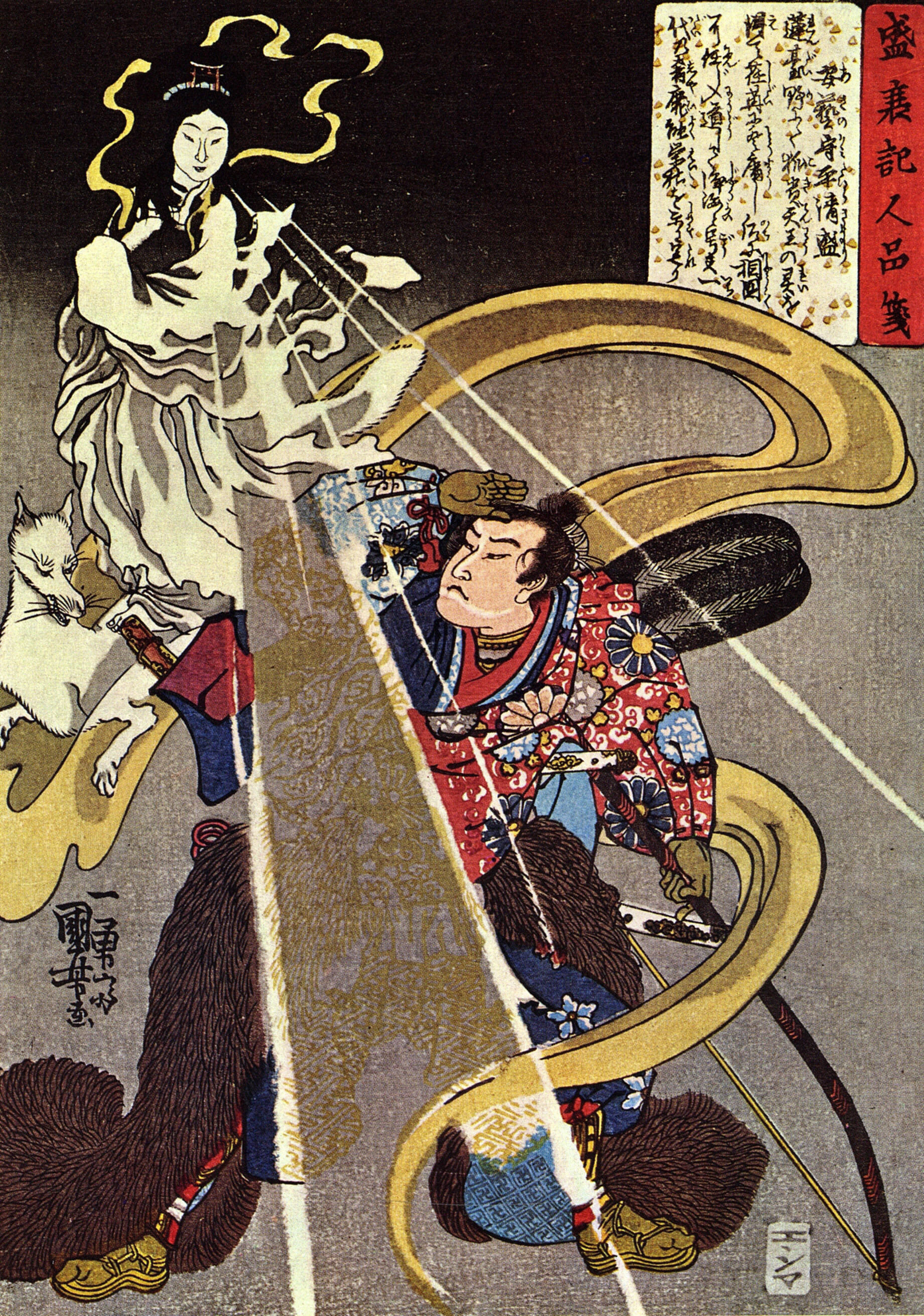
A man confronted with an apparition of Inari, appearing in this case as a woman

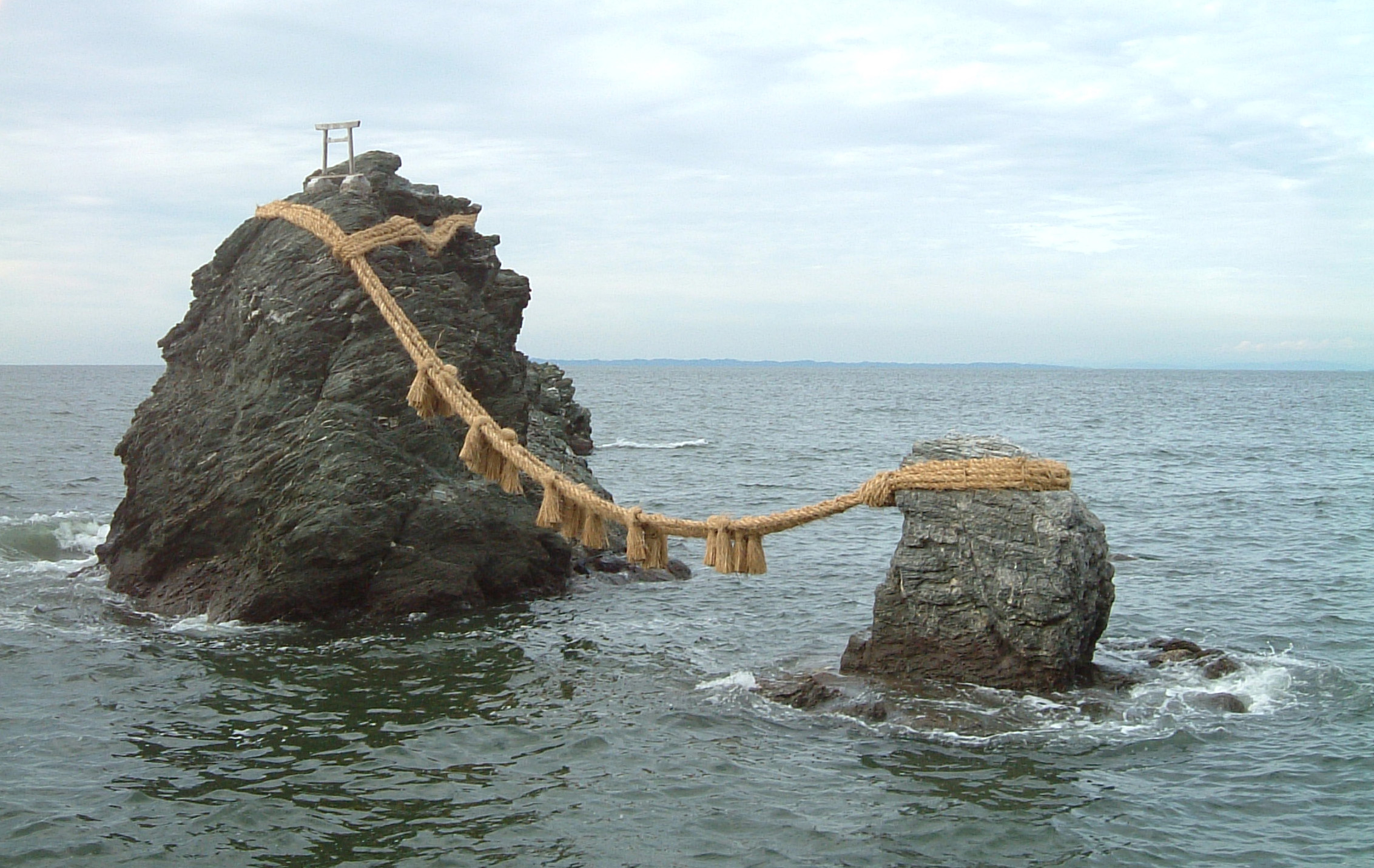
An iwakura (the Meoto Iwa) girdled by a shimenawa

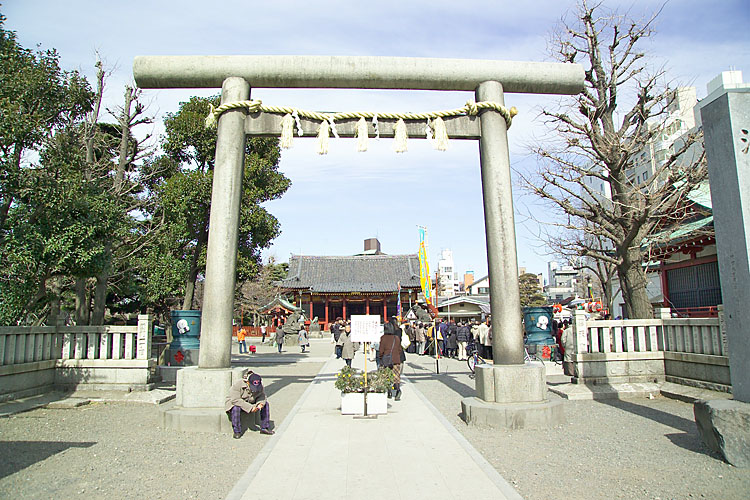
A jinja (shrine), characterized by the presence of a torii

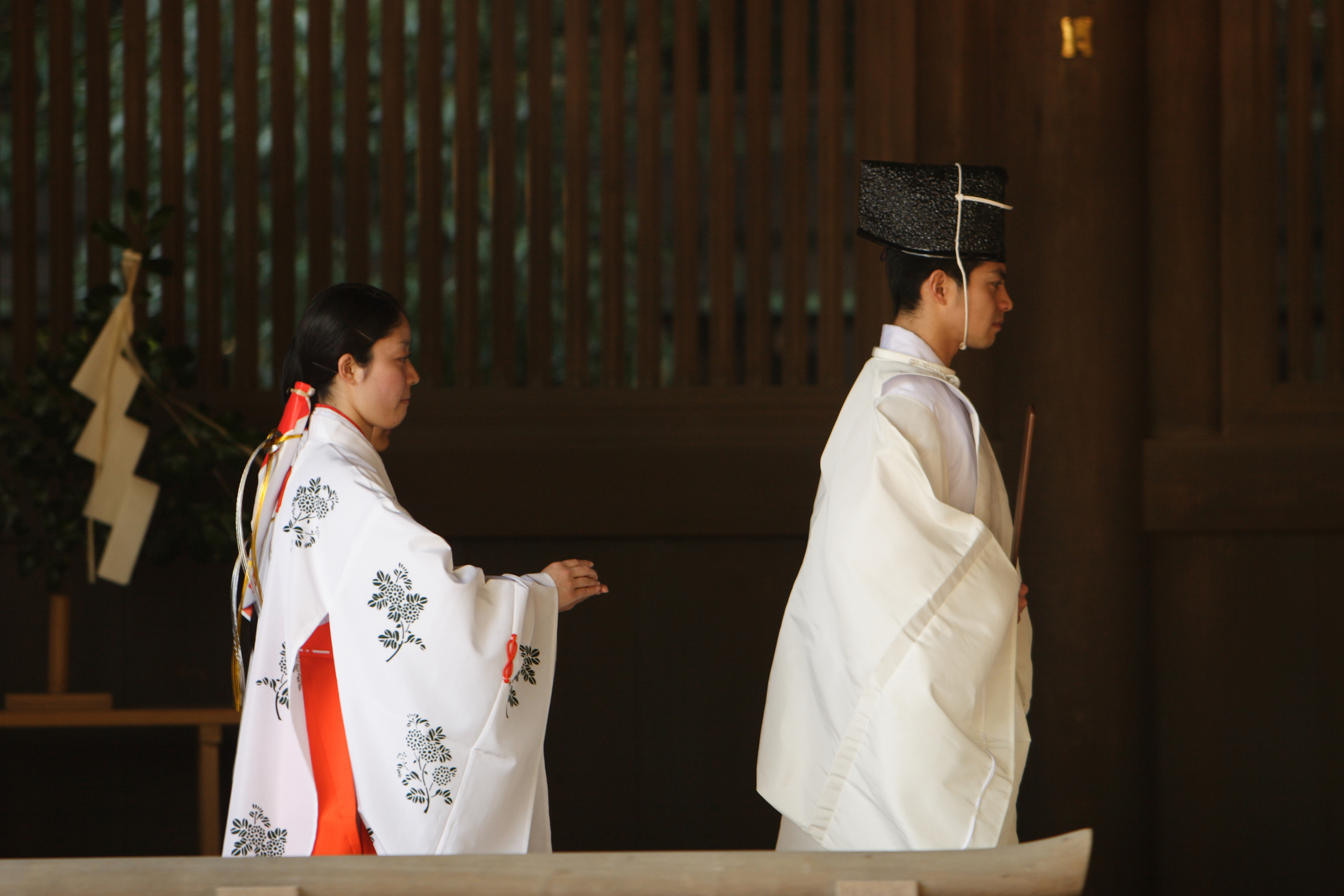
A kannushi (right) wearing a jōe

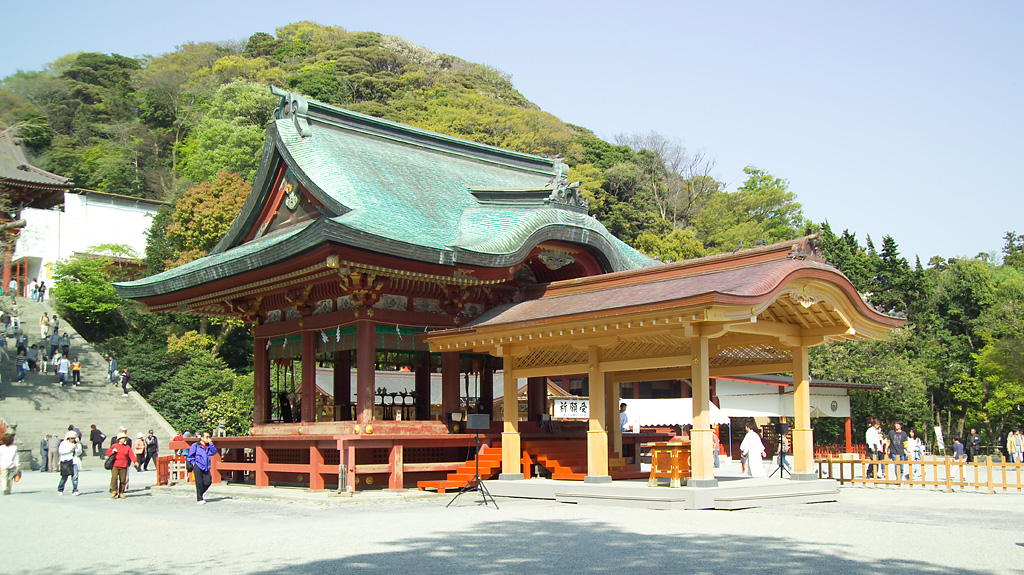
A kaguraden

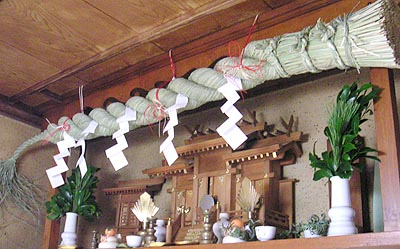
A kamidana

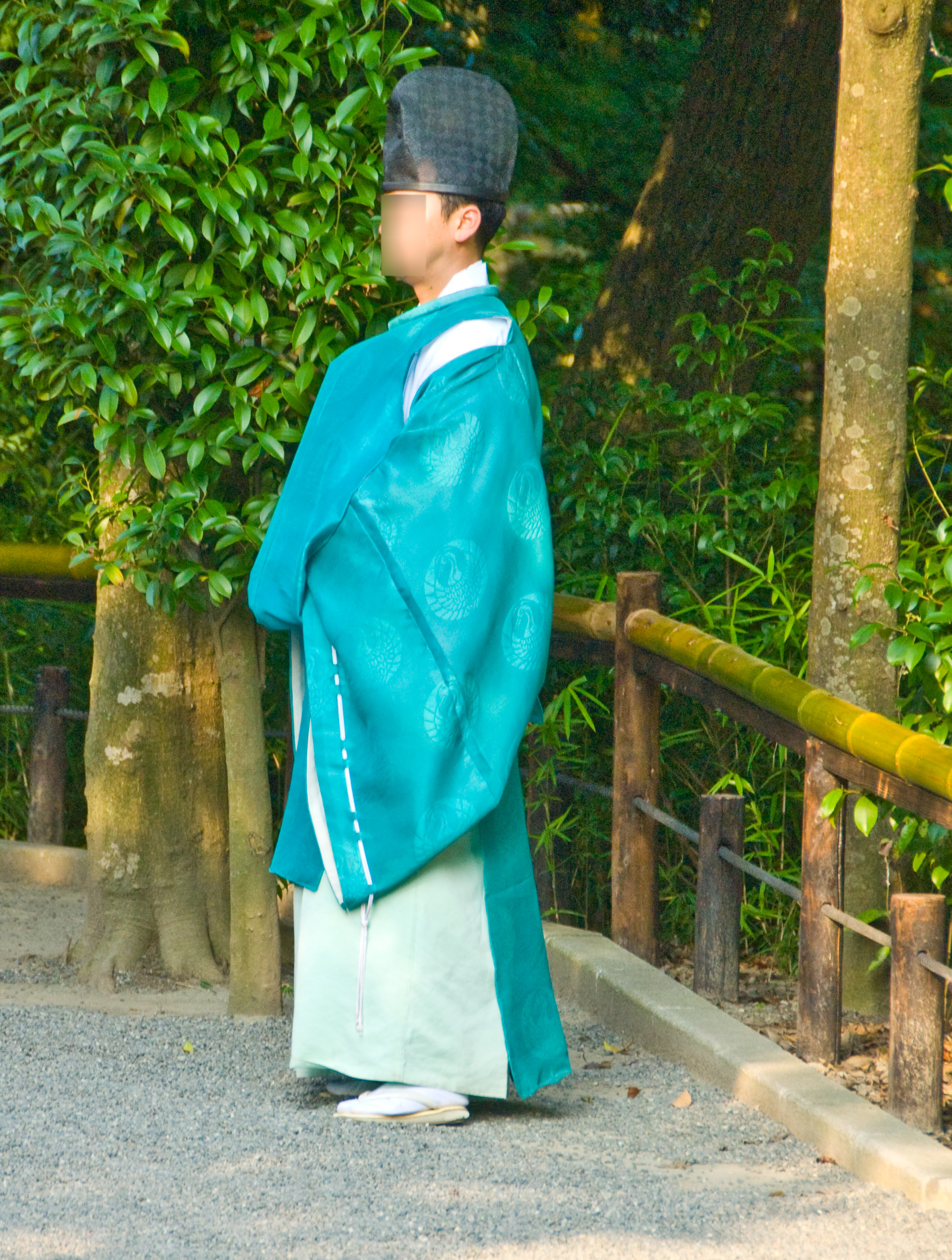
A kannushi during a wedding

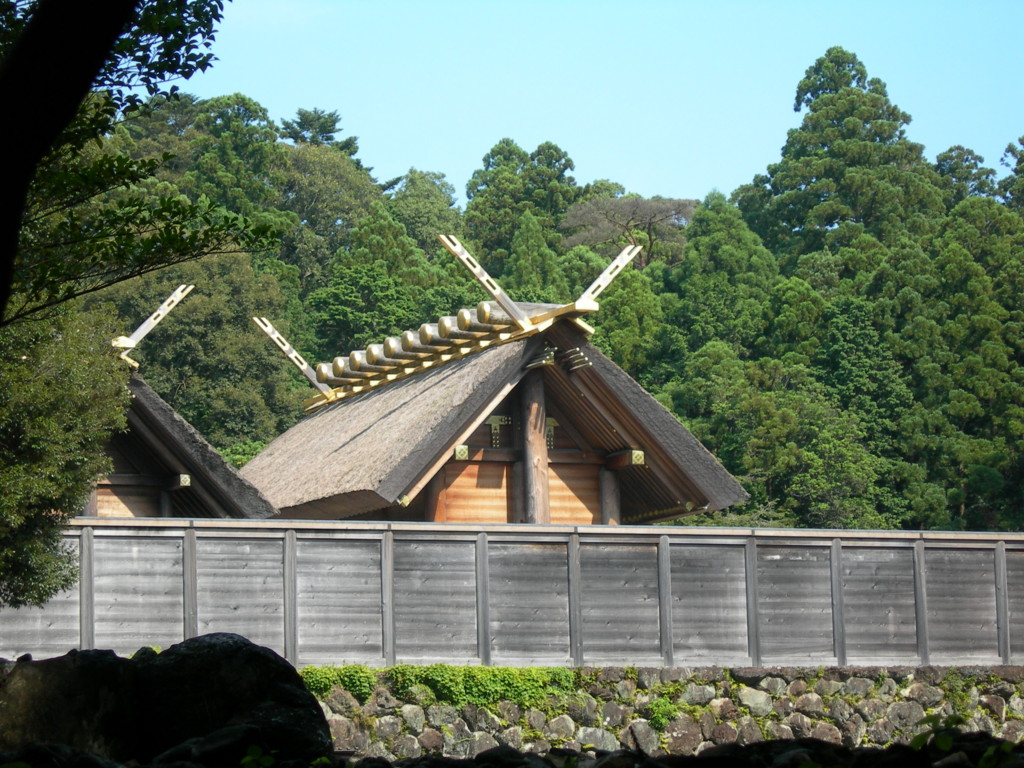
Katsuogi (poles perpendicular to the roof ridge) at Ise Shrine

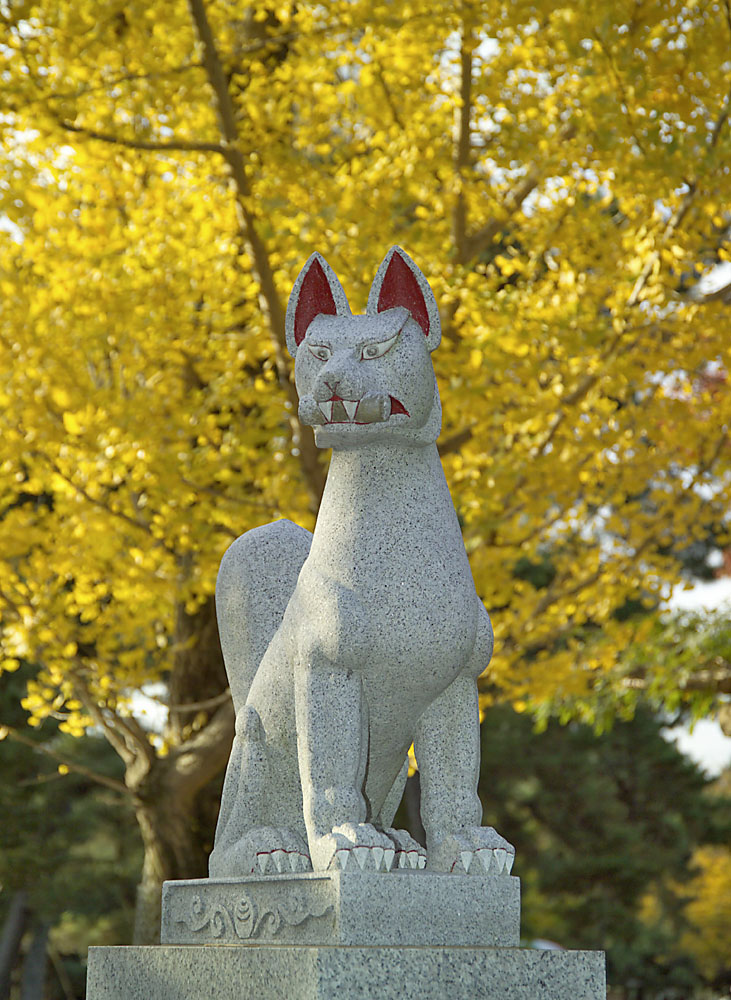
Statue of a fox, messenger of kami Inari

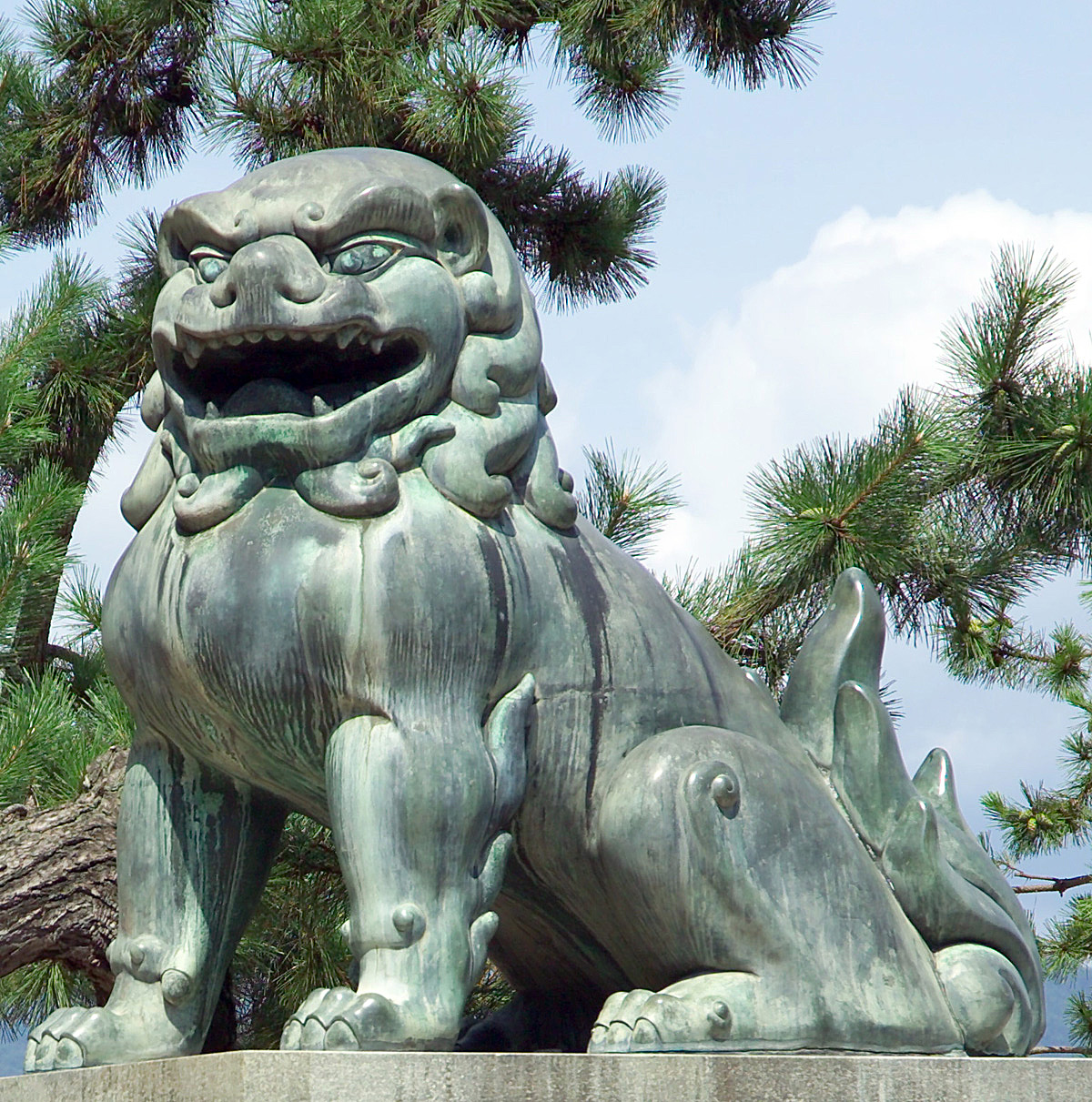
A komainu

== M ==
- Madai (真鯛, lit. 'genuine seabream') – A fish native to Japan. It is also featured among Engimono (above), as its red colour is seen as auspicious. The madai is often seen with Ebisu, as he is the patron kami of fisherman and one of the Seven Lucky Gods.
- Magatama* (勾玉 or 曲玉, lit. 'curved jewel') – A comma-shaped jewel, often used as a yorishiro. See also Yasakani no Magatama.
- Makoto (誠, lit. 'honesty') – One of the virtues of bushido.
- Manju (満珠) – One of two magical gems that Ryūjin used to control the tides; its counterpart is the Kanju.
- Maneki-neko (招き猫, lit. 'beckoning cat') – A protective and good luck talisman.
- Marebito (稀人 or 客人) – A concept of a spiritual or divine being that visits from the 'other world' (takai, a term for the Japanese afterlife) at specific times and, thus, must be shown the height of hospitality.
- Massha* (末社, lit. 'descendant shrine') – A synonym of sessha.
- Mayoke (魔除け) – A ward against evil.
- Meido (冥土) – Another name for Yomi.
- Meikai (冥界, lit. 'dark world') – Another word for Yomi.
- Meiyo (名誉, lit. 'Honour') – One of the seven-plus Virtues of Bushido.
- Miko* (巫女, 神子, 巫 or 覡) – A woman who helps kannushi in their work, or a woman possessing magic powers and capable of giving fortunes.
- Mikoshi (神輿) – A divine palanquin.
- Misogi* (禊) – An ascetic practice of ritual ablution purification.
- Mitama (御魂, 御霊 or 神霊, lit. 'honourable soul') – The spirit of a kami or the soul of a dead person. The opposite of mitama is tamashii. See also ara-mitama, kushi-mitama, nigi-mitama and saki-mitama.
- Miya (宮, lit. 'palace') – A term that often defines a shrine enshrining a special kami or a member of the Imperial household, for example an empress. See also Ō-miya (below)
- Miyamairi (宮参り, lit. 'shrine visit') – A traditional rite of passage for newborns held at a shrine.
- Mizutama (水玉, lit. 'water orb') – A small, droplet-shaped vessel, used for holding offerings of fresh water on a kamidama, and is to be changed daily; belongs to the shingu for holding offerings.
- Mochitsuki (餅搗き, もちつき) – A traditional activity for occasions like Japanese New-Year, rice is pounded into mochi and is eaten in hopes of gaining good fortune over the coming year. The activity is associated with the moon, jade, or golden rabbit, which according to East-Asian folklore, is said to pound rice (or the elixir of life) in its mortar and pestle, at the behest of the kami.
- Momijigari (紅葉狩, lit. 'red leaf hunting') – The Japanese traditional festival and custom of enjoying the transient beauty of leaves changing colour in the autumn; the Japanese tradition of going to visit scenic areas where leaves have turned red in the autumn; particularly maple tree leaves.
- Mononoke (物の怪) – A monstrous apparition; a monster.
- Mori (杜 or 森, lit. 'forest') – A wood, a forest, a grove, specifically a grove or forest on shrine grounds. It reflects close relationship between trees and shrines. Tree worship is common in Shinto.
- Muenbotoke (無縁仏) – The soul or spirit of a deceased human with no living connections amongst the living; the dead who have no living relatives); similarly to gaki and jikininki, a muenbotoke can be appeased by a sagaki.
- Mugen Jigoku (無間地獄) – The eighth and deepest level of Jigoku, where sinners that have committed murder, theft, degeneration, drunkenness, lying, blasphemy, and rape, parricide, and assassination of holy men are sent.
- Musubi-no-Kami (結びの神, lit. 'deity of binding') – One of the Shinto kami of creation; also known as the kami of matchmaking, love, and marriages.
- Musuhi (産霊) – A term in Shinto for the spiritual influences that produces all the things in the universe and helps them develop and complete their cycle.
- Myōjin (明神, lit. 'bright deity') – A term that refers to a title, historically applied to kami and their shrines. See also sannō.

== N ==
- Nagashi-bina (流し雛) – Ritual purification ceremonies held where participants make dolls out of materials such as paper or straw and send them on a boat down a river, carrying one's impurities and sin with them.
- Naginata (薙刀, lit. 'weeding blade') – A polearm, sometimes dedicated to shrines (along with other weapons, such as katana and spears), and indicative of a kami's power to ward off negative influences.
- Namahage (生剥, lit. 'raw peel') – In traditional Japanese folklore is a demon-like being, portrayed by men wearing hefty oni masks and traditional straw capes during a New Year's ritual.
- Nanakusa-gayū (七草粥) – A traditional meal of congee and herbs served on Nanakusa-no-Sekku. The seven herbs are Japanese parsley, shepherd's purse, Pseudognaphalium affine, chickweed, nipplewort, turnips, and daikon.
- Nanakusa-no-Sekku (七草の節句, lit. 'seven-herb festival') – One of the five annual traditional festivals held throughout the year. It is observed on 7 January.
- Nanareizan (七霊山, lit. 'seven spiritual mountains') – Seven mountains revered as sacred in Shinto and Buddhism; they are: Mount Fuji, Mount Haku, Mount Tate, Mount Ōmine, Mount Shakka, Mount Daisen, and Mount Ishizuchi.
- Naraku (奈落) – The Hell realm of incarnation, the lowest and worst realm on the wheel of reincarnation. See rinne.
- Nenju (念珠 lit. 'thought beads') – Shinto-Buddhist rosary; a string or necklace of beads used for prayers.
- Ne-no-kuni (根の国, lit. 'land of roots') – A term referring to a netherworld or limbo in Japanese mythology, like the Sanzu River. It is sometimes considered to be identical to Yomi, but darker, as well as Tokoyo-no-kuni.
- Nigi-mitama (和魂, lit. 'tranquil soul') – The friendly and cooperative side of a complete mitama. It is associated with the colour white and the cardinal direction of west.
- Nihon Shoki (日本書紀) – An early Japanese written chronicle of myths, legends, songs, genealogies, oral traditions, and semi-historical accounts down to 720 AD. Similar to the Kojiki.
- Ningen (人間) – The human realm of incarnation, the third-highest realm on the wheel of reincarnation. See Rinne (below).
- Nio (仁王) – In Shinto-Buddhism, nio is the Japanese name for the Kongōrikishi, the two wrathful and muscular guardians of the Buddha standing at the entrance of many Buddhist temples. See also a-un, and Gozu and Mezu.
- Norito (祝詞, lit. 'invocation scripts') – liturgical texts or ritual incantations in Shinto, usually addressed to a given kami.
- Norito (祝, lit. 'blessing') – Written spells for blessings.
- Noroi (呪, 詛 & 咒, lit. 'curse') – Written spells for curses.
- Noshi (熨斗) – Ceremonial pieces of paper wrapped in a sheet of coloured paper folded in a long hexagonal shape that are attached to gifts and presents offered on festive occasions in Japan.
- Nusa (幣) – See ōnusa; a wooden wand used in Shinto rituals. It is decorated with many shide.
- Nyoihōju (如意宝珠, lit. 'As-One-Wishes Jewel') – A wish-fulfilling jewel within both Hindu and Buddhist traditions, and the Eastern equivalent of the philosopher's stone in Western alchemy. It is one of several Mani Jewel images found in Buddhist scripture. The Nyoihōju is commonly-depicted within the hands of Kisshōten, as-well-as in the hands of a bodhisattva in art.

== O ==
- Obake (御化け or お化け) – An apparition or spectre.
- Ofuda (御札 or お札) – Written paper spells, amulets and talismans. See also omamori.
- Okame (阿亀) – Also called Otafuku. It is a mask that depicts the face of a woman who has a short nose and swollen round cheeks.
- O-kome (御米) – Offerings of white rice made at Shinto shrines and a household's kamidana. See also kome.
- O-kuizome (お食い初め, lit. 'first food') – When a baby is 100 days old, Japanese families celebrate a weaning ceremony called O-Kuizome. This ceremony traditionally involves a large shared meal prepared by the mother-in-law.
- Ōkuninushi (大国主神, lit. 'Master of the Great Land' or 'Great Master of the Land') – see Daikokuten.
- Ōmagatoki (逢魔時 and 大禍時) – A term referring to the moment at twilight, when the sky grows dark. Ōmagatoki is the time when chimimōryō, the evil spirits of the mountains and rivers, attempt to materialise in the World of the Living.
- Omamori (お守り) – amulets and talismans available at shrines and temples for particular purposes, for example health or success in business.
- Omigoro (小忌衣, lit. 'small mourning robes') – An overcoat robe used for Shinto services.
- Ō-miki (御神酒 or 神酒) – Offerings of white rice wine made at Shinto shrines and a household's kamidana. It is often consumed as part of Shinto purification rituals. See also sake.
- Omikuji* (御御籤 or 御神籤) – fortunes written on strips of paper that are often found at shrines wrapped around tree branches.
- Oni (鬼) – In one interpretation of an oni, they are a kind of yōkai, whereas another interpretation of an oni is as something completely separate from a yōkai (although both are supernatural monsters). See also jikininki and gaki.
- Onibabā (鬼婆) – An oni woman from Japanese legends. See also kijo and yama-uba.
- Onibi (鬼火) – A type of atmospheric ghost light in legends of Japan; according to folklore, they can be anything from fires caused by oni, to the spirits born from the corpses of humans and animals. They are also said to be resentful people that have become fire and appeared.
- Onigawara (鬼瓦, lit. 'Oni Tile(s)') – A type of roof ornamentation found in Japanese architecture. They are generally roof tiles or statues depicting an oni. Prior to the Heian period, similar ornaments with floral and plant designs (hanagawara) preceded the onigawara.
- Oni hitokuchi (鬼一口) – A term similar to kamikakushi and tengukakushi (below), referring-to the mysterious disappearance or death of a person without warning or without a trace.
- Oni-wa-Soto! Fuku-wa-Uchi! (鬼は外! 福は内!, lit. 'Demons Out! Luck In!') – A mantra for driving-off malevolent spirits, demons or devils that cause ill fortune to allow good fortune to work unimpeded.
- Onmyōdō (陰陽道, lit. 'yin-yang way') – A traditional Japanese esoteric cosmology; a mixture of natural science and occultism.
- Onmyōji (陰陽師, lit. 'yin-yang practitioner') – A practitioner of onmyōdō.
- Onmyōryō (陰陽寮) – A governmental office of onmyōdō that was responsible for timekeeping and calendar-making. They also documented and analysed omens and fortunes.
- Onryō (怨霊, lit. 'vengeful spirit') – A type of vengeful spirit; a poltergeist.
- Ō-Nenju (念珠 or 数珠) – A string of prayer beads commonly used in Hinduism, Jainism, Sikhism, Buddhism and Shinto for the spiritual practice known in Sanskrit as japa.
- Ō-Nusa (大幣) – Wooden wands used in rituals. Decorated with many shide, they are waved left and right during ceremonies.
- Osechi (御節, lit. 'season') – Also known as osechi-ryōri (御節料理 or お節料理), an osechi is a traditional spread of Japanese New Year foods. The tradition started in the Heian period (794–1185). Osechi are recognizable by their jūbako (重箱), which resemble bentō boxes. Osechi includes dishes like ozōni.
- O-Shichiya (お七夜, lit. 'seventh night') – When a baby turns seven days old, families officially name the baby. The mother, the father, and the grandparents are often involved in this process.
- Otafuku (阿多福) – A mask that represents a smiling Japanese woman with large, rosy cheeks. Otafuku is also known as Ame-no-Uzume
- Ō-yashiro (大社) – See also Taisha.
- Ozen (お膳, lit. 'Great Tray') – A traditional Japanese four-legged tray used to carry food offerings.

== Gallery: M to O ==
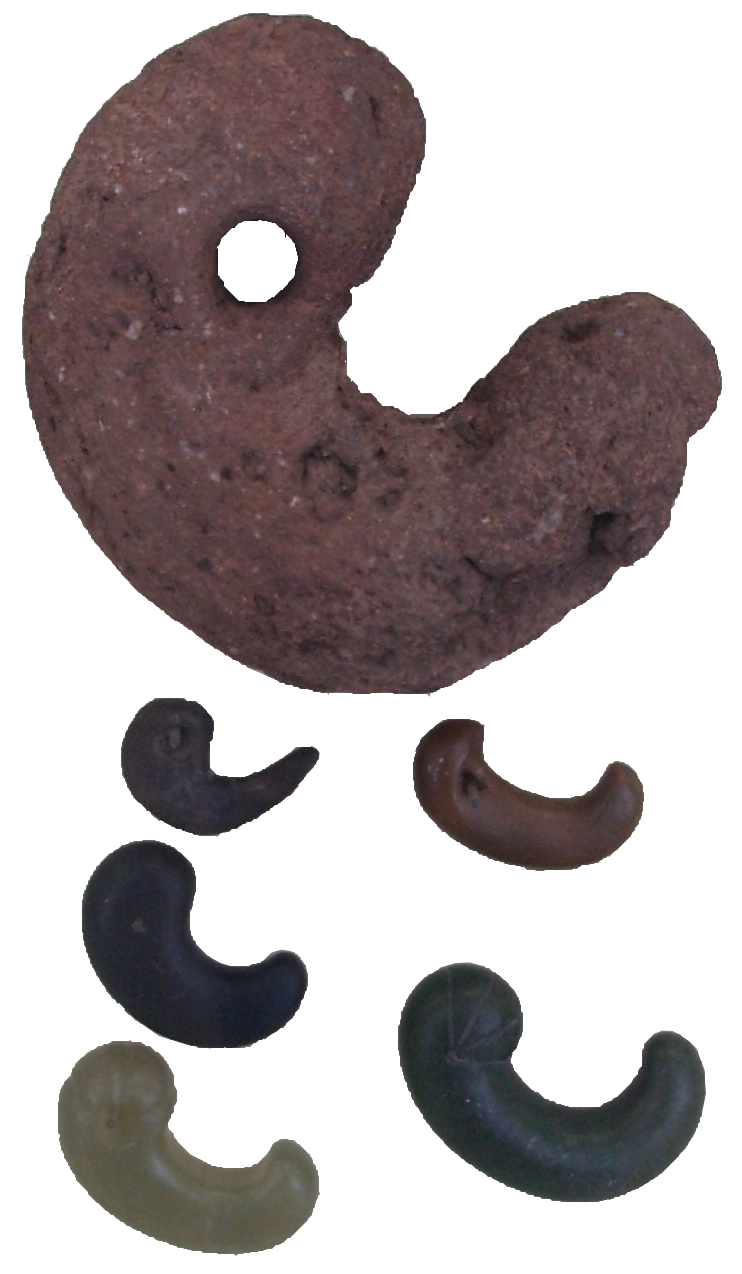
Jōmon period magatama

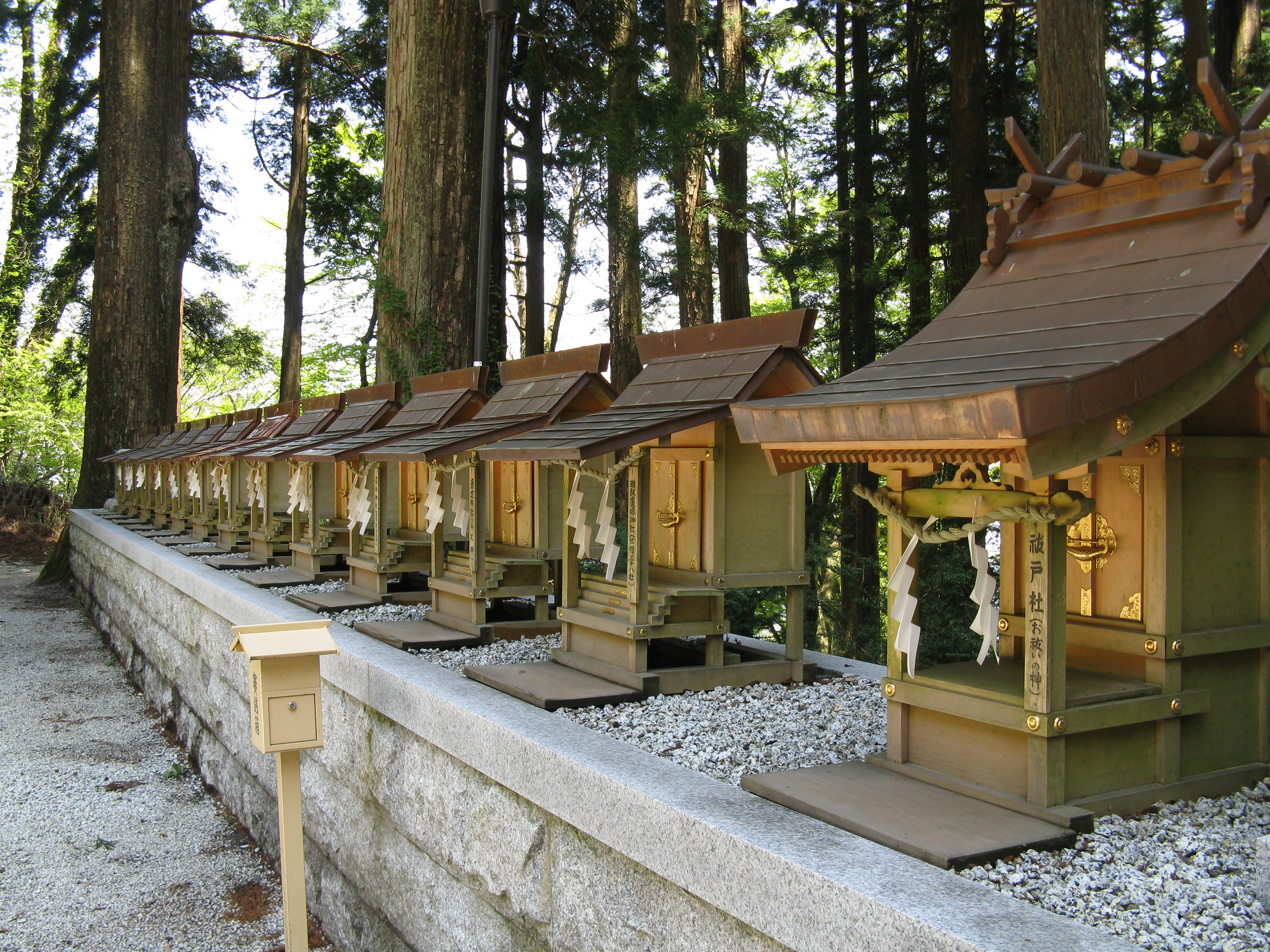
Massha at Katsuragi Shrine in Gose, Nara

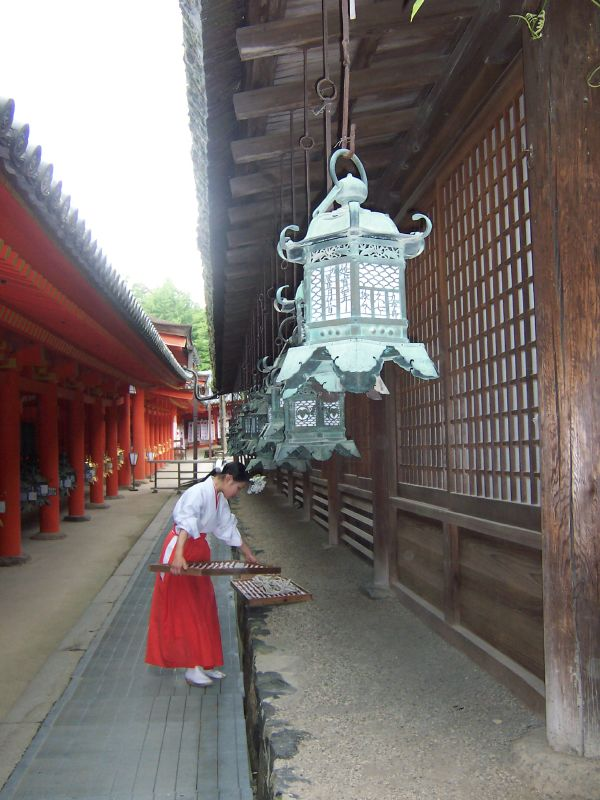
A miko at Kasuga Shrine

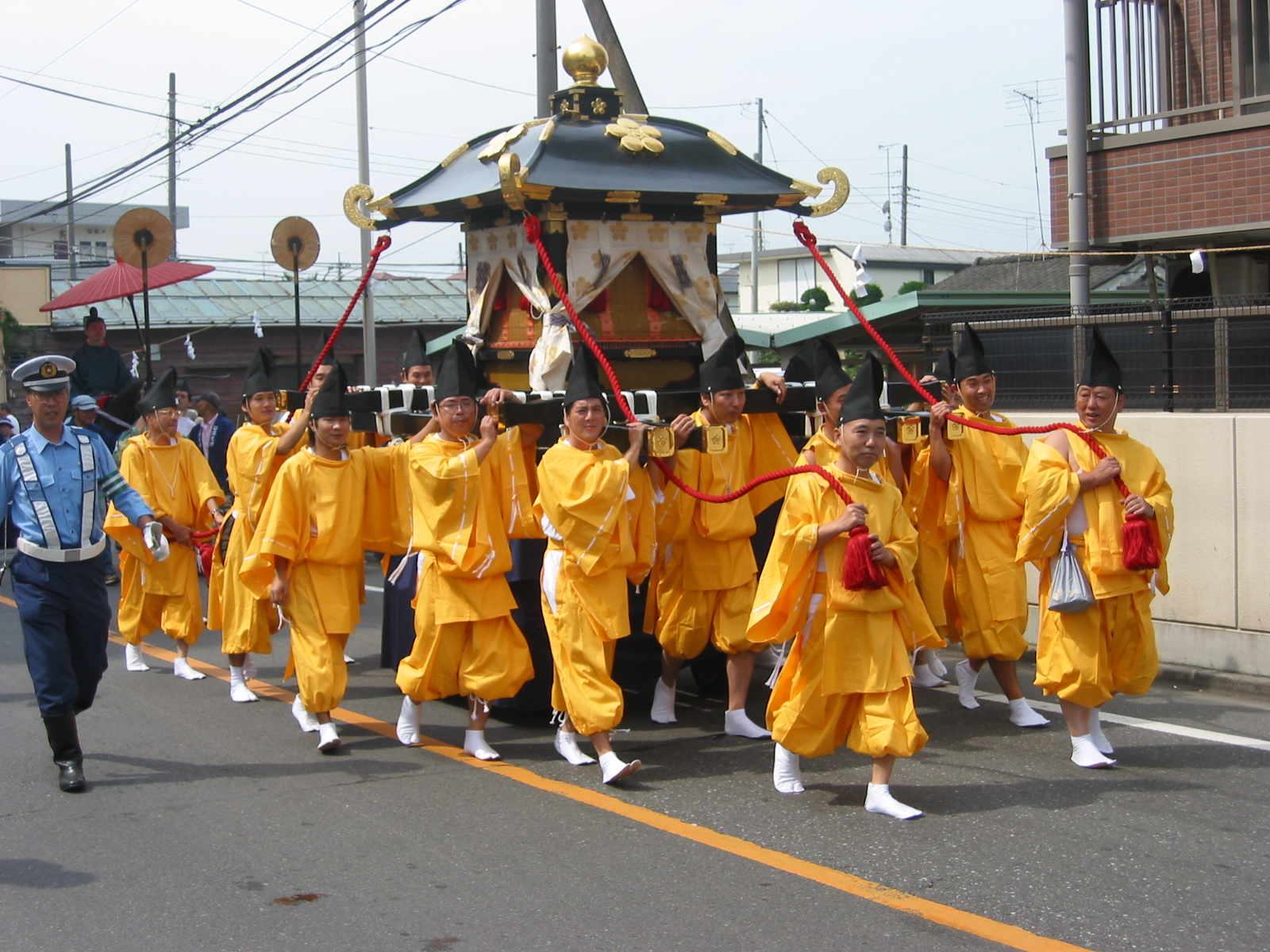
A mikoshi

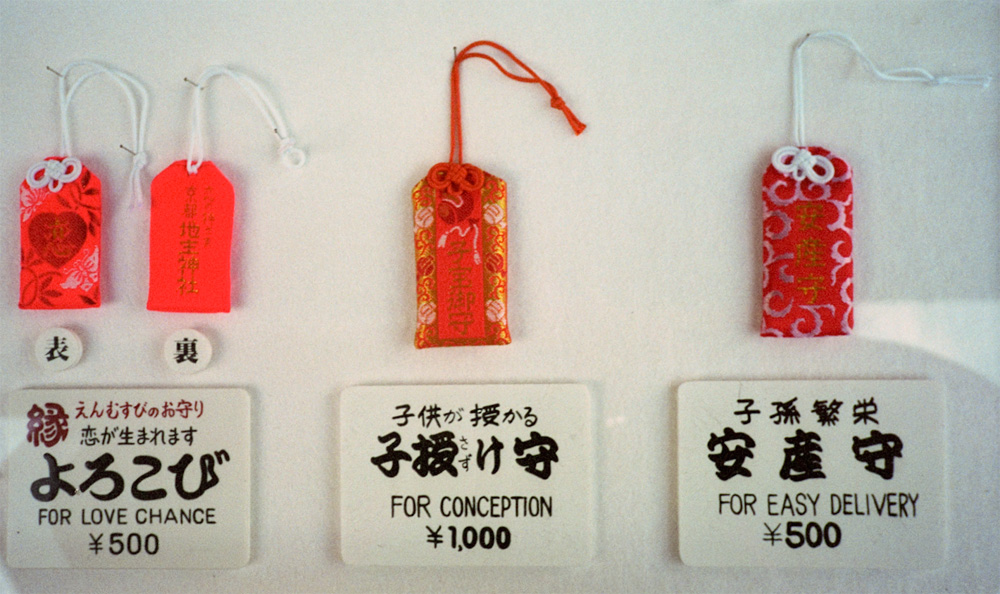
Omamori on sale

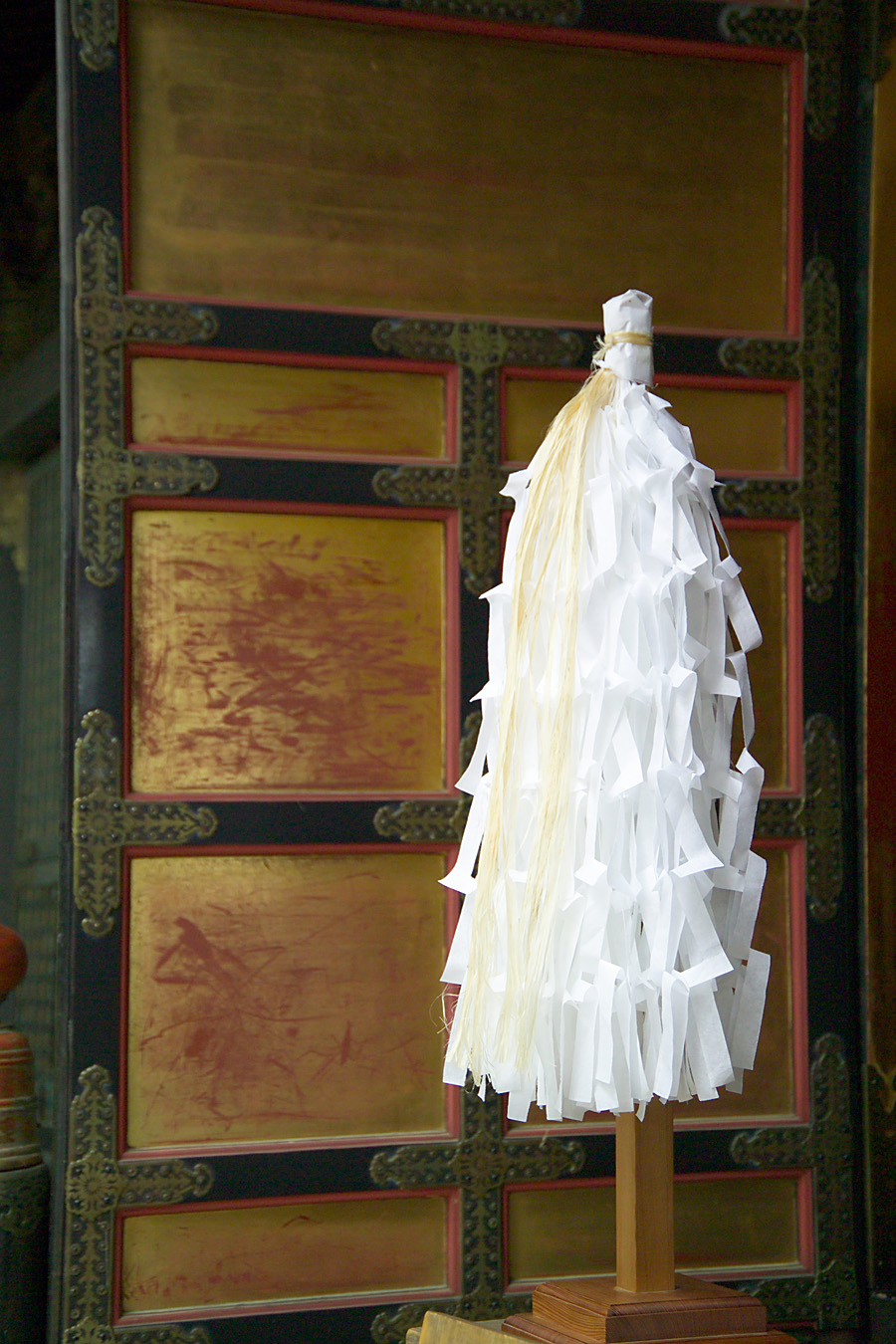
An ōnusa

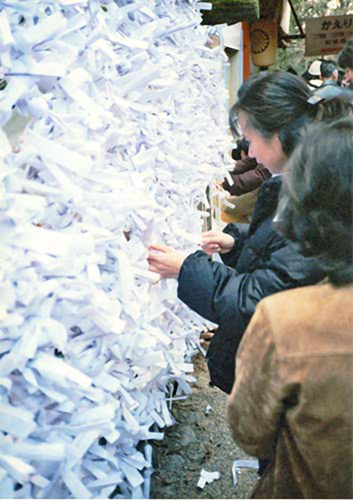
Tying omikuji at Kasuga Shrine in Nara

== R ==
- Raijin (雷神) – The kami of thunder and lightning who is the brother of Fūjin; together, they are both said to be two of the many sons and other children of Izanagi and Izanami.
- Rakan (羅漢) – An Arhat, a Buddhist saint.
- Rei (礼, lit. 'etiquette') – One of the virtues of bushido.
- Rei (霊, lit. 'spirit') – The soul or spirit.
- Reibai (霊媒) – A person who can sense the presence of spirits and other supernatural/paranormal phenomena.
- Reikai (霊界, lit. 'spirit world') – See seishinkai.
- Reikan (霊感, lit. 'spirit sense') – The ability to sense the presence of spirits and other supernatural/paranormal phenomena.
- Reiki (霊鬼) – The soul or spirit of someone or something dead, particularly malevolent.
- Reikon (霊魂) – The soul or spirit of a person, usually someone who has just died.
- Reinōryoku (霊能力, lit. 'Spirit Sensing Prowess') – The ability to sense the presence of spirits and other supernatural/paranormal phenomena; the term for psychics in Japan is Reinōsha (霊能者, lit. 'Spiritual Ability Person').
- Reizan (霊山, lit. 'Spirit Mountain') – A holy mountain.
- Rin (鈴) – A type of standing bell or resting bell.
- Rinne (輪廻) – The concept of rebirth; the beginning-less cycle of repeated birth from within six realms of reincarnation, mundane existence and dying again.
- Rokuyō (六曜), the six-day week of the Shinto-Buddhist calendar.
- Ryōbu Shintō (両部神道) – Also called shingon Shintō, in Japanese religion, the syncretic school that combined Shinto with the teachings of the Shingon sect of Buddhism. The school developed during the late Heian and Kamakura periods. The basis of the school's beliefs was the Japanese concept that kami were manifestations of Buddhist divinities.
- Ryūjin (龍神, lit. 'Dragon God') – The tutelary deity of the seas and oceans in Shinto mythology.

== S ==
- Saidan (祭壇, lit. 'festival podium') – An altar or a structure to make offerings to kami.
- Saikigū (祭器具) – The utensils used in religious ceremonies, including the sanbō, oshiki, hassoku-an, and takatsuki.
- Sakaki* (榊) – A type of flowering evergreen tree native to Japan that is sacred in Shinto. Cuttings of sakaki, called tamagushi, are often offered as offerings at shrines and in rituals. Cuttings are also displayed on either side of a kamidana as offerings.
- Sakaki-tate (榊立, lit. 'Sakaki Stands') – A pair of small, white vases, used for displaying cuttings of sakaki are displayed on either side of a kamidana as offerings and at rituals.
- Sake (酒) – An alcoholic beverage made by fermenting white rice.
- Saki-mitama (幸魂) – The happy and loving side of a complete mitama. It is associated with the colours red and pink, and with the cardinal direction of south.
- Sanbō (三方, lit. 'three directions') – A stand used to bear food offerings, usually made of unpainted Japanese cypress.
- Saisen (賽銭) – Offerings of money given by worshipers.
- Saishi (祭祀) - rituals.
- Sanbon Jime (三本締め) – A custom in Japan; rhythmic-clapping hands—and shouting-loudly—when celebrating. This is done when people are celebrating the successful end of an event.
- Sandō* (参道) – The path leading from a torii to a shrine. The term is also used sometimes at Buddhist temples too.
- Sannō (山王, lit. 'Mountain King') – A term that refers to, both a title for a type of kami, and a specific divine spirit that protects a divine mountain.
- Sanpai sahō (参拝作法) – The way in which the Japanese worship at shrines, bowing twice, clapping twice, then bowing one last time.
- Sanreizan (三霊山, lit. 'three spiritual mountains') – Three mountains revered as sacred in Shinto: Mount Fuji, Mount Haku, and Mount Tate. They are included amongst the Nanareizan.
- Sanzu River (三途の川, lit. 'River of Three Crossings') – A mythological river that acts as a boundary between the lands of the living and the dead.
- Sei (精, lit. 'vitality') – The energy of living things.
- Seichi (聖地, lit. 'hallowed ground') – Another word for jōdo.
- Seijin-no-Hi (成人の日) – A Japanese holiday held annually on the second Monday of January. It is held to congratulate and encourage all those who have reached or will reach the age of maturity between 2 April of the previous year and 1 April of the current year.
- Seimei Kikyō (晴明紋/晴明桔梗) – A pentacle that is the personal seal of Abe-no-Seimei, later becoming the symbol for the Onmyōryō (the government ministry department for the practice of onmyōdō, or the Bureau of Taoist Geomancy) and for onmyōdō itself, given its association with the Five Elements.
- Seirei (精霊, lit. 'Soul') – A general umbrella term for the essence, spirit or soul of a nonspecific thing.
- Seisatsu* (制札) – A signboard containing announcements and rules for worshipers.
- Seishinkai (精神界, lit. 'spirit world') – A spiritual, non-corporeal world that coexists with the material world, that human beings inhabit, but in a different dimension.
- Senjafuda (千社札, lit. 'thousand shrine tags') – Votive slips, stickers or placards (and ofuda) posted on the gates or buildings of Shinto shrines and Buddhist temples in Japan. The stickers bear the name of the worshipper, and can be purchased pre-printed with common names at temples and shrines throughout Japan, as well as at stationery stores and video game centres. Senjafuda were originally made from wooden slats, but have been made of paper since the Edo period.
- Sessha* (摂社) – A smaller shrine housing a kami having a strong relationship with that of the honsha (the main shrine). A synonym of massha.
- Setsubun (節分, lit. 'seasonal divide') – A ceremony held on February 3 that celebrates the beginning of spring in Japan.
- Shaku (笏) – A flat baton often seen in portraits of noblemen and samurai, but also used by kannushi.
- Shamusho (社務所, lit. 'Shrine Business Establishment') – A shrine's administrative office. It often sells omamori and other goods.
- Shichi-Go-San (七五三, lit. 'seven-five-three') – A traditional rite of passage and festival day in Japan for three- and seven-year-old girls and five-year-old boys, held annually on November 15.
- Shide* (垂, 紙垂 and 四手) – A zigzag-shaped paper streamer often attached to a shimenawa and to tamagushi, and is used in rituals.
- Shigai (絲鞋) – Moccasin-like footwear, made from silk with leather soles. Originally worn by children and young woman of the aristocratic-class, it is now (or, at-least was) worn by miko in Shinto rituals.
- Shika (鹿) – A deer. In Shinto, they are considered messengers of the kami.
- Shikome (黄泉醜女) – Hags sent by Izanami to pursue Izanagi for shaming her. Their numbers differ between the Kojiki and the Nihon Shoki.
- Shinbai (神媒) – A divine spiritualist or medium.
- Shinbatsu (神罰, lit. 'divine punishment') – Punishment dealt-out by a kami against transgressions committed by mortals and immortals alike.
- Shinboku (神木, lit. 'divine tree') – A tree considered divine.
- Shimekazari (注連飾り) – A wreath made of braided-shimenawa rope with auspicious additions interwoven into it. Shimekazari are put up as decorations for Japanese New Year, along with kadomatsu.
- Shimenawa (標縄 / 注連縄 / 七五三縄, lit. 'Enclosing Rope') – Lengths of rope made from laid/woven/braided rice straw or hemp that are used for ritual purification.
- Shinen (神苑, lit. 'divine gardens') – The gardens on shrine grounds.
- Shingu (神具, lit. 'divine tool') – A term for the items displayed upon a kamidana (see above).
- Shinidama (死魂, lit. 'dead soul') – The soul of a dead person.
- Shiniki (神域, lit. 'divine domain') – The perimeters of a shrine or a place where kami dwell. It is also used to refer to any place of significant importance.
- Shinji (神事, lit. 'divine service') – Rituals and services in Shinto.
- Shinkan (神官, lit. 'divine official') – A person serving a certain god or working as a government official at a facility where God is worshipped. Shinkan is also used as a term designating a Shinto priest (a person involved in religious services and office work in a shrine).
- Shingaku (神額) – A plaque mounted to the front of the torii or main hall of a shrine, bearing the name of the shrine.
- Shinko (神狐, lit. 'divine fox') – Similar to komainu, shinko are twin dual statues of foxes, usually depicted as having white fur, who serve Inari Ōkami as messengers.
- Shinkyō (神鏡, lit. 'divine mirror') – A mirror that is often included in shrine altars and home altars; they are believed to represent the kami themselves.
- Shinra Banshō (森羅万象) – A Shinto-Buddhist term, meaning "all things existing in the universe": According to Shinto, the kami exist within shinra banshō.
- Shinsōsai (神葬祭) – A Shinto funeral service.
- Shinza (神座, lit. 'divine seat') – A place where there is a kami or a place where housing the sacred object of a shrine, like a sanctum sanctorum.
- Shinzen-Kekkonshiki (神前結婚式) – A Shinto wedding ceremony.
- Shio (塩, lit. 'salt') – In Shinto, salt is used for ritual purification of locations and people (harae, specifically shubatsu (修祓)), and small piles of salt are placed in dishes by the entrance of establishments for the two-fold purposes of warding off evil and attracting patrons.
- Shinbutsu bunri (神仏分離) – The legal forbiddance of the syncretism between Shinto and Buddhism.
- Shiryō/shirei (死霊, lit. 'dead spirit') – The spirit of a dead person. The terms are used in contrast to ikiryō, which refers to a disembodied spirit that leaves the body of a still-living person and haunts other people or places, sometimes across great distances.
- Shintai (神体, lit. 'divine body') – A sacred object, but also natural objects such as trees and mountains, which represents the kami for worship.
- Shrine – The English word that translates several more specialized Japanese words (see article Shinto shrine). Any structure housing a kami.
- Shinbutsu kakuri (神仏隔離) – The tendency in medieval and early modern Japan to keep particular kami separate from any form or manifestation of Buddhism.
- Shinbutsu shūgō (神仏習合) – The syncretism of Buddhism and local religious beliefs, the normal state of things before the shinbutsu bunri.
- Shinsen (神饌) – Offerings of foods given to Shinto shrines or kamidana for the kami.
- Shio (塩) – In Shinto, salt is used for offerings at Shinto shrines and a household's kamidana, ritual purification of locations and people, and small piles of salt are placed in dishes by the entrance of establishments for the twofold purpose of warding off evil and attracting patrons.
- Shōdo (聖土, lit. 'Hallowed ground') – See also jōdo (see above) and seichi (see above).
- Shonetsu Jigoku (焦熱地獄, lit. 'Hell of Burning') – The third level of Jigoku, where sinners who have committed murder, theft, and degeneration are sent.
- Shubatsu (修祓) – A ceremony involving salt that is conducted immediately prior to rituals in order to purify participants, food offerings and tamagushi, of sins and defilement. See also misogi.
- Shugenja (修験者) – A practitioner of shugendō.
- Shugo Jigoku (衆合地獄) – The sixth level of Jigoku, where sinners who have committed murder, theft, degeneration, drunkenness, lying, and blasphemy are sent.
- Shuin (朱印, lit. 'vermillion seal') – A commemorative seal stamp given to worshippers and visitors to Shinto shrines and Buddhist temples in Japan. The seal stamps are often collected in shuinchō that are sold at shrines and temples.
- Shuinchō (朱印帳, lit. 'vermillion seal book') – A book used to collect shuin.
- State Shinto – A term first used after World War II to broadly classify Shinto ideals, rituals and institutions created by the pre-war government to promote the divinity of the emperor and the uniqueness of Japan.
- Shura (修羅) – The semi-divine/Ashura realm of incarnation, the second-highest realm on the wheel of reincarnation. See also rinne.
- Sōhei (僧兵, lit. '[Buddhist] Monk Warrior') – A Sōhei is a practitioner of Shugendō. Sōhei are also known as a Shugenja (above), and a Yamabushi (below); a kind of mountain hermit.
- Sorei (祖霊, lit. 'ancestral spirits') – A term in Shinto-Buddhism that refers to the spirits of one's ancestors.
- Suikan (水干) – An informal garment, like a tunic, worn by males of the Japanese nobility in the Heian period, as outerwear; an informal garment, like a tunic, worn by males of the Japanese nobility in the Heian period, as outerwear.
- Susanoo-no-Mikoto (須佐之男 / 須佐能乎) – The multifaceted kami of storms, the sea, open fields, the harvest, marriage, and love, the son of Izanagi and the younger brother of Amaterasu Ōkami and Tsukuyomi.
- Suzu (鈴, lit. 'bell') – A round, hollow Shinto bell that contains pellets that sound when agitated.

== Gallery: R to S ==
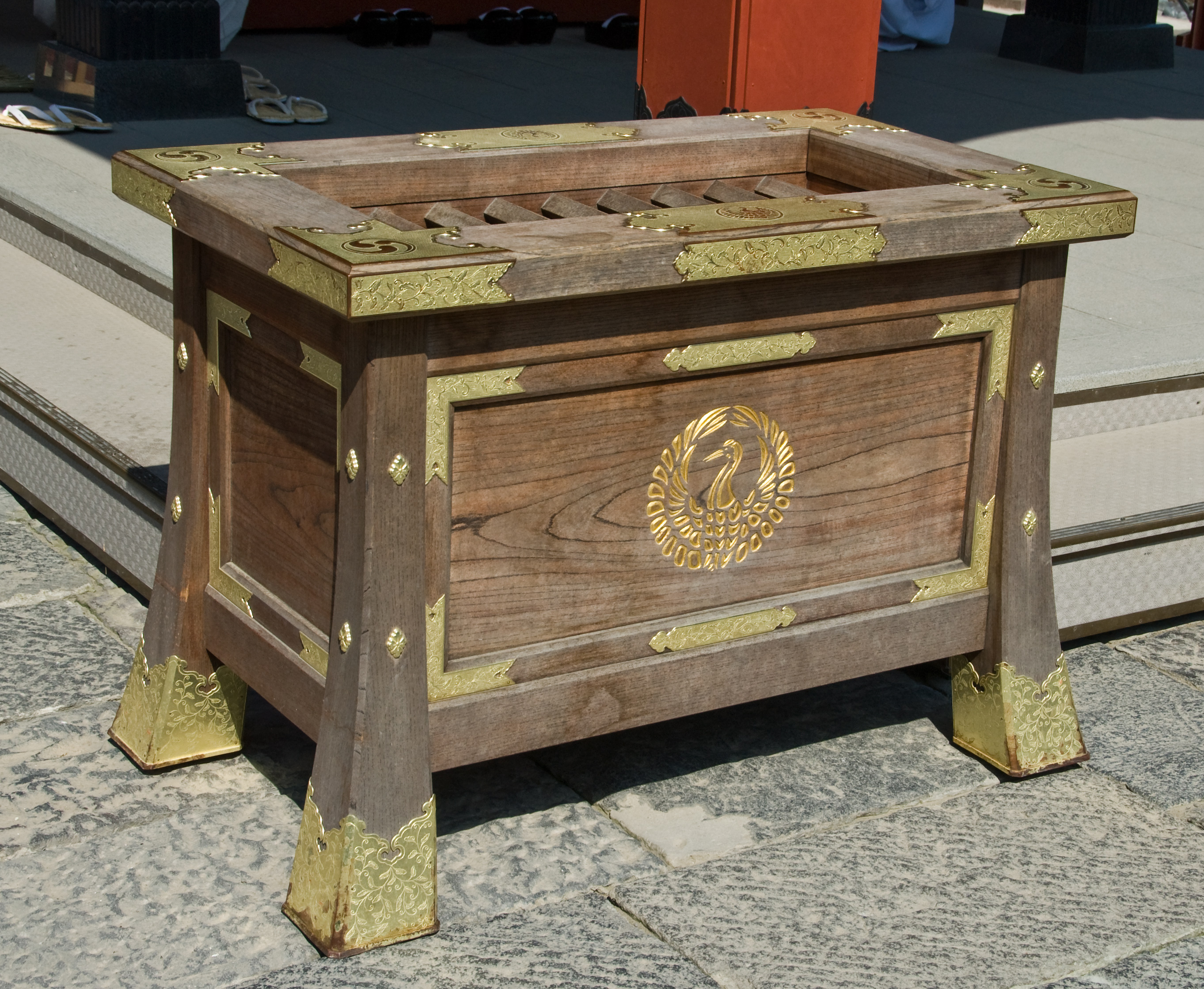
A saisen-bako, or offertory box

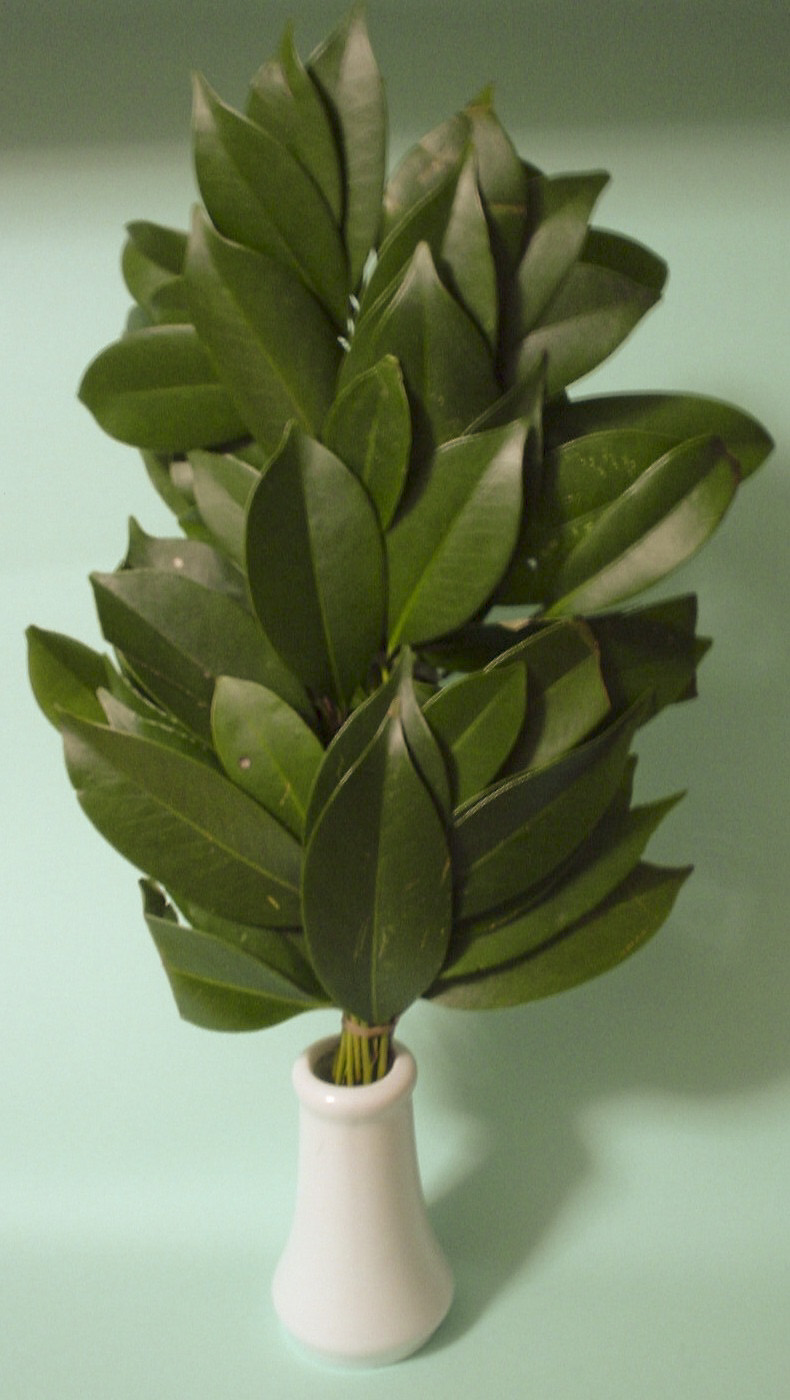
Sakaki branches

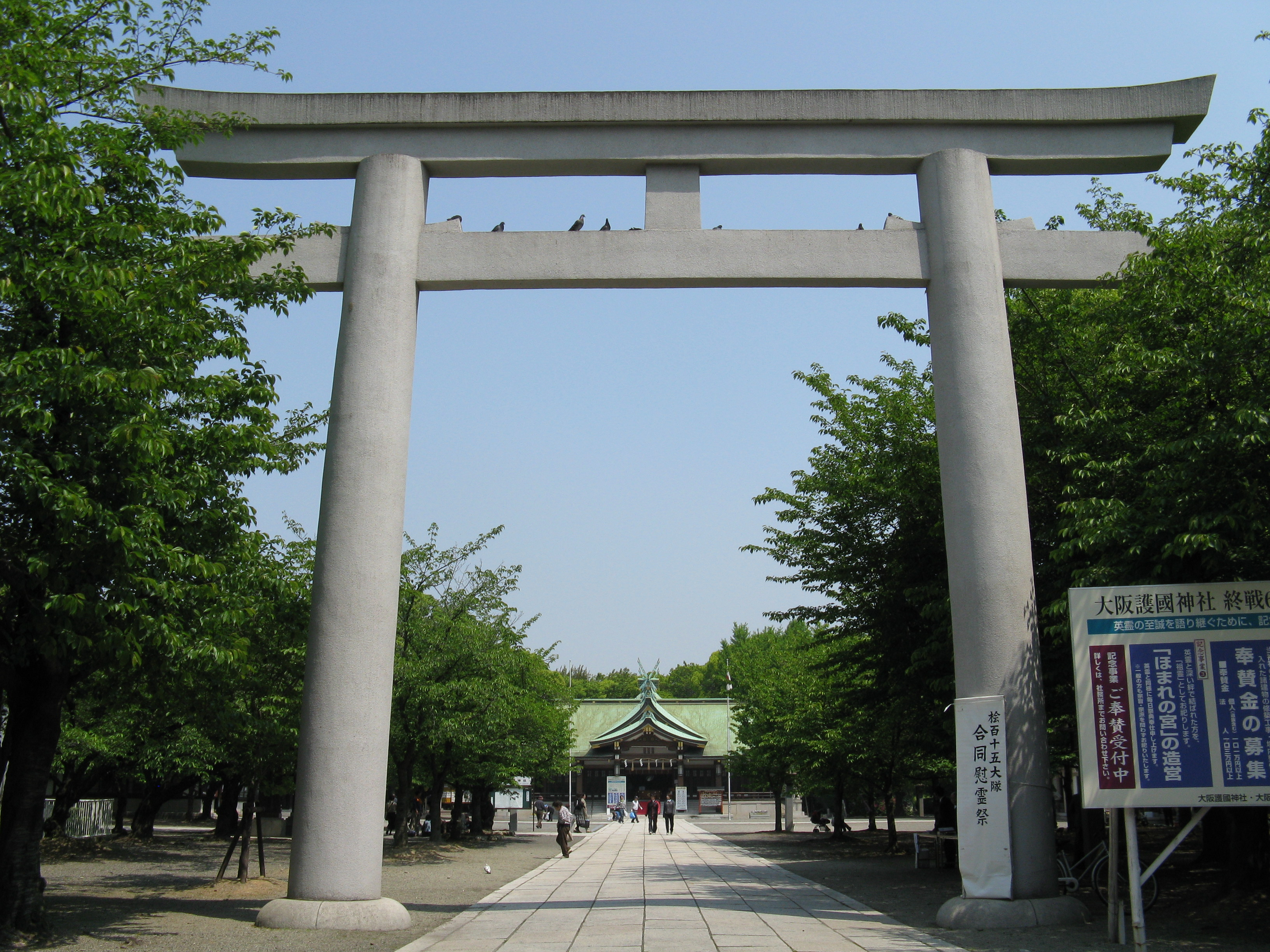
A sandō (a shrine's approach)

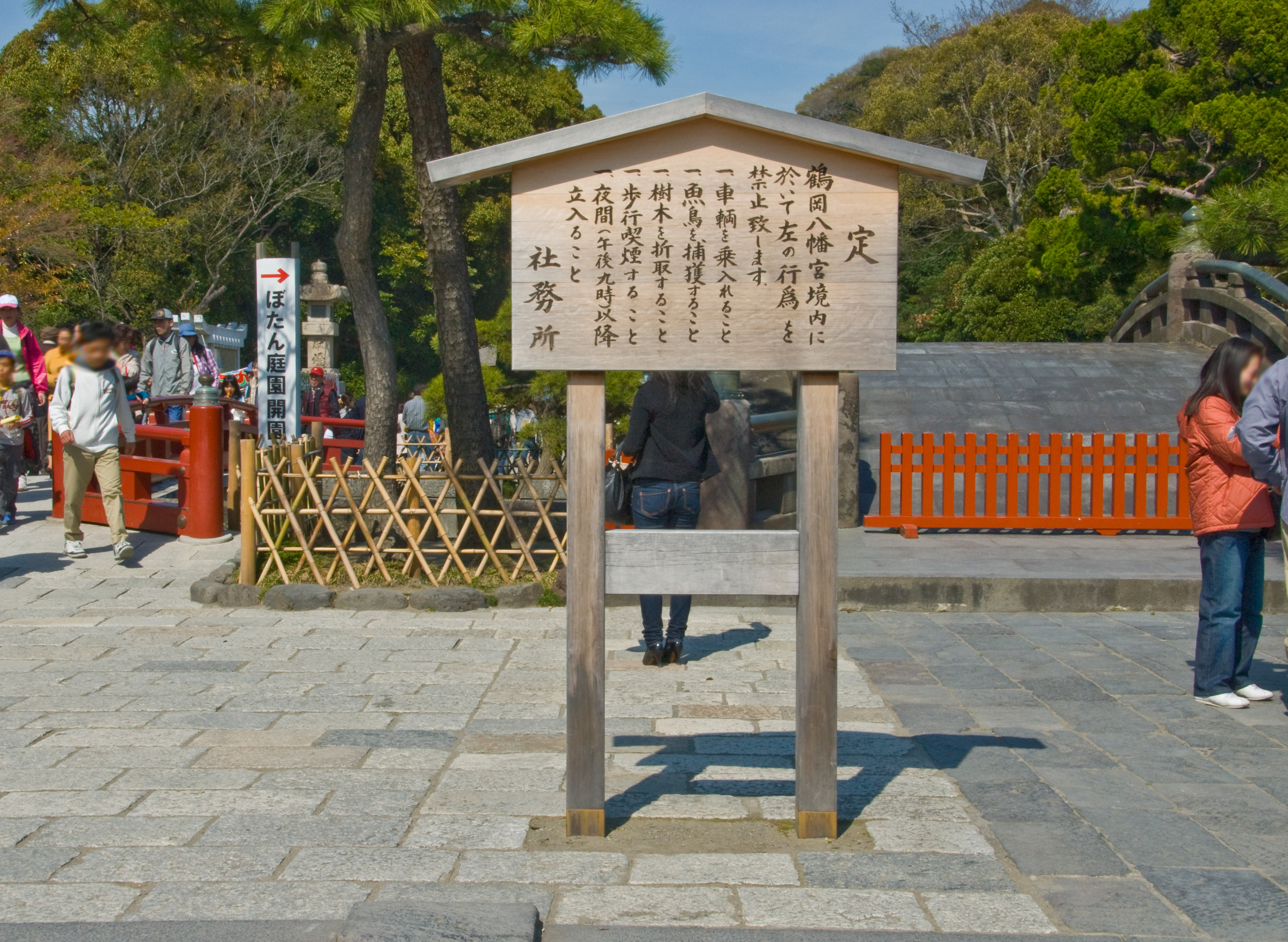
A seisatsu

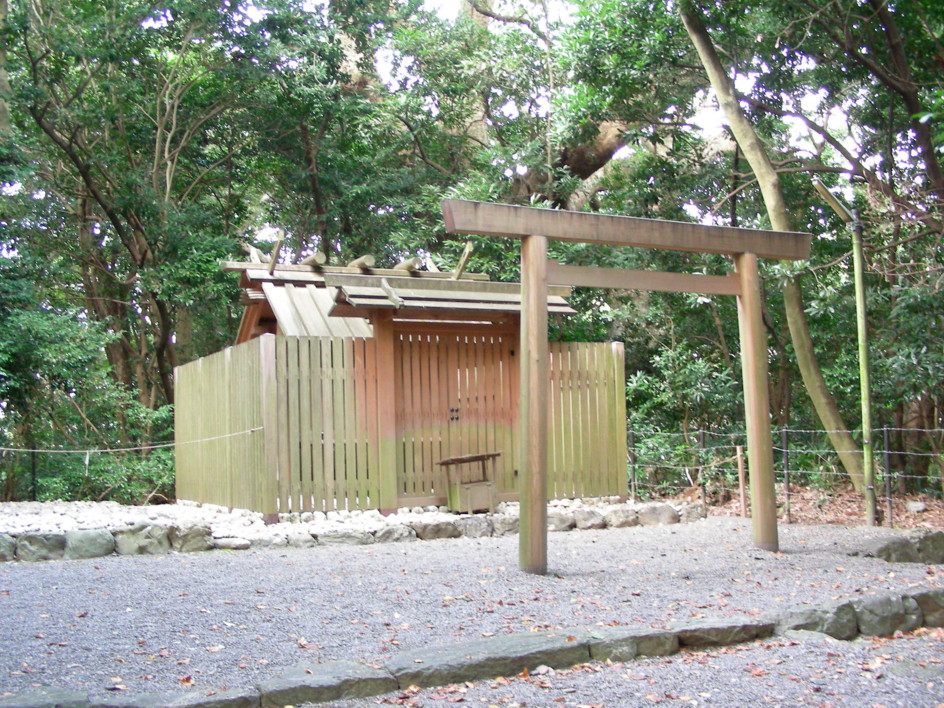
Sessha (Tsukkomi no Miya) at Ise Grand Shrine

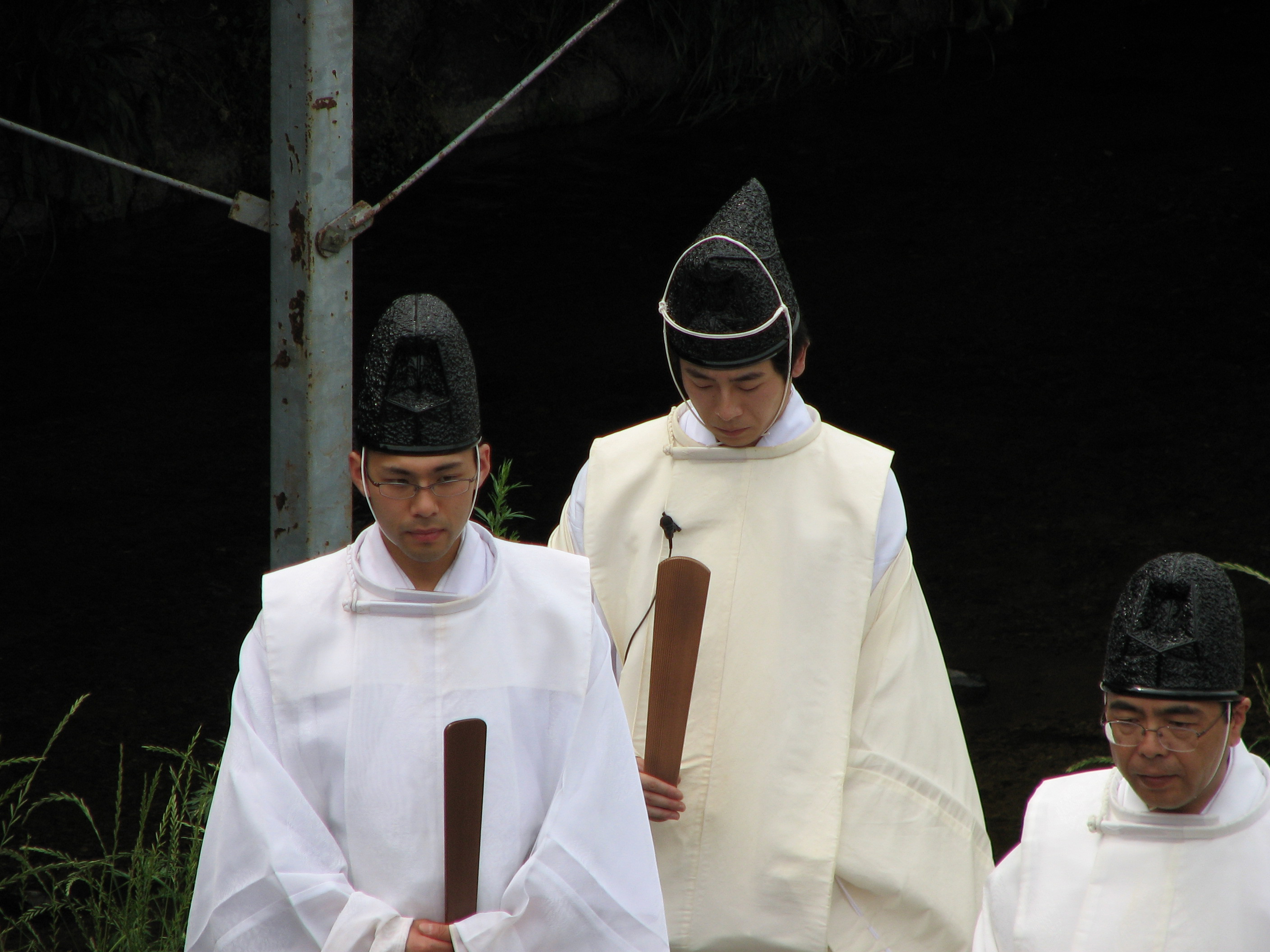
Two kannushi holding a shaku

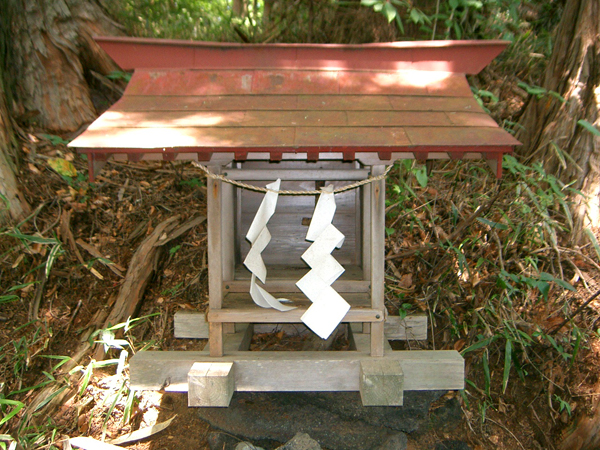
Two shide decorating a small shrine

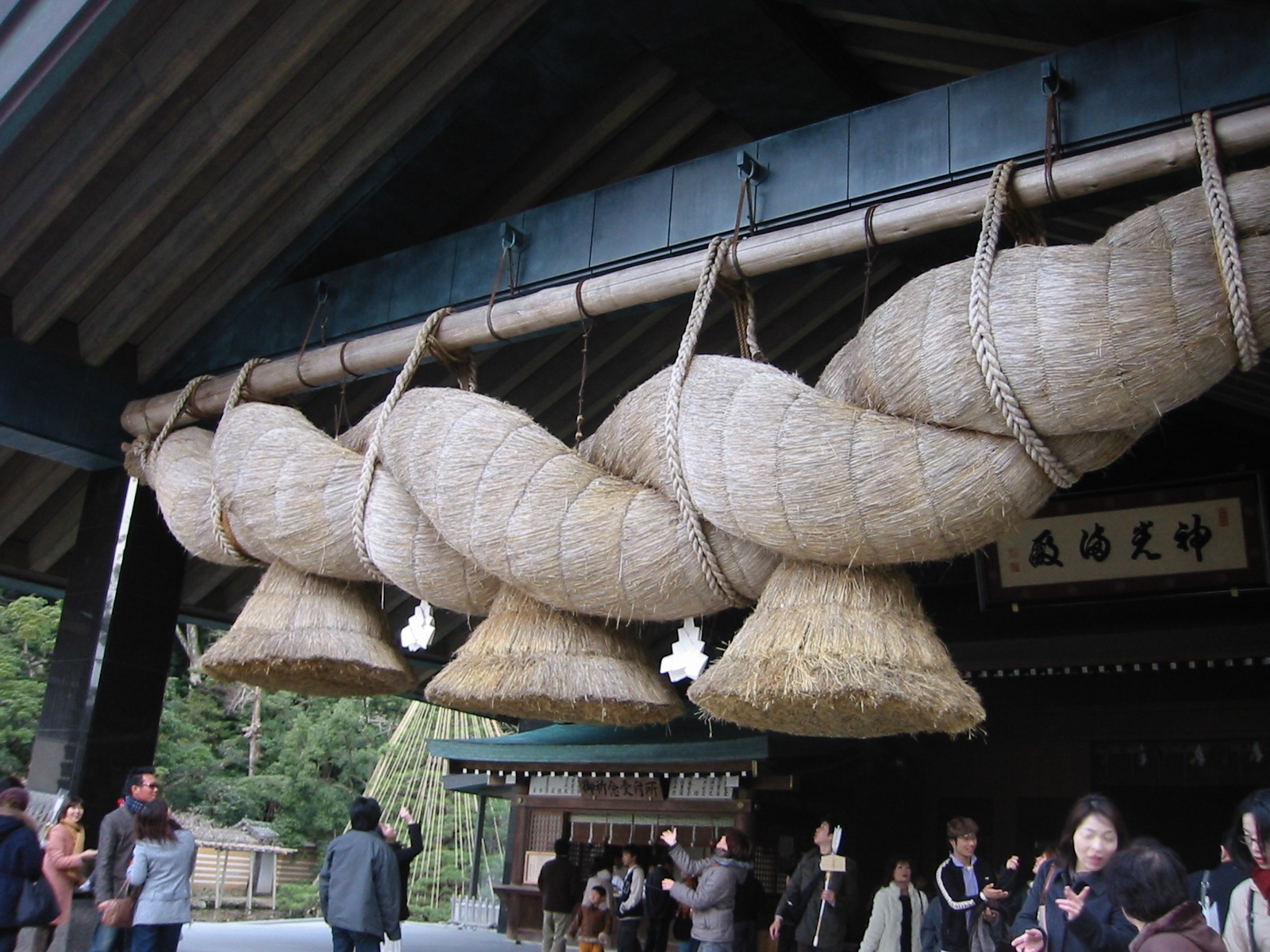
A shimenawa

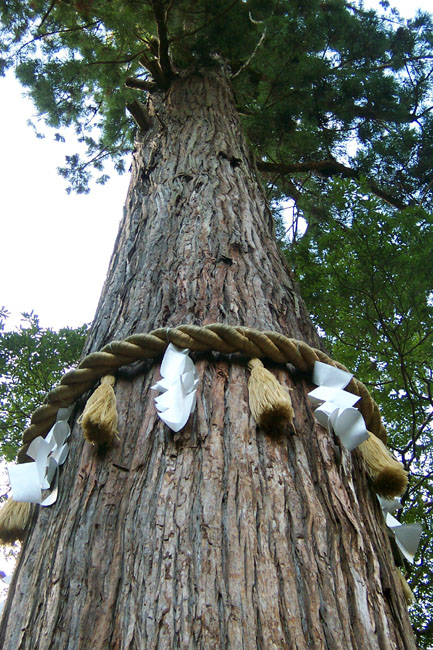
A shimboku girdled by a shimenawa

== T ==
- Taiko (太鼓, lit. 'great drum') – A term for a broad range of Japanese percussion drums. The taiko drum has been an integral part of Japanese Shinto and Buddhist religious practices and folklore for centuries.
- Taisha (大社, lit. 'large shrine') – A term usually used as a part of the official name of a shrine, as for example in Izumo-taisha.
- Taisha-zukuri (大社造, lit. 'large shrine architecture') – The oldest style of shrine architecture used for example at Izumo-taisha.
- Takamagahara (高天原, lit. 'Plains of the High Heaven') – In Shinto, the dwelling place of the heavenly gods, the Amatsukami. It is believed to be connected to the Earth by Ama-no-uki-hashi.
- Takarabune (宝船, lit. 'treasure ship') – A mythical ship piloted through the heavens by the Seven Lucky Gods during the first three days of the New Year.
- Tamagaki (玉垣, lit. 'jewel fence') – The fence delimiting the sacred soil of a shrine.
- Tamagushi* (玉串, lit. 'jewel skewer') – A form of offering made from a sakaki-tree branch and strips of paper, silk, or cotton.
- Tamashii (魂) – A soul within its proper body, encompassing one's mind, heart and soul. The opposite of tamashii is mitama.
- Tamaya (霊屋, lit. 'spirit house') – An altar used in Shinto-style ancestor worship, dedicated in the memory of deceased forebears. It generally has a mirror symbolizing the spirits of the deceased or a tablet bearing their names and is used not only to enshrine blood relatives, but also to honor respected non-family members..
- Tanuki (狸) – A mammal native to Japan (and Asia (as a subspecies of the Asian raccoon dog)) and to Japanese culture and folklore since ancient times. It is known in folklore to be mischievous and jolly, a master of disguise, and with a taste for sake. It is also regarded as a Japanese art animal, appearing in many different forms of both modern and traditional art.
- Tanzaku (短冊) – A small strip of paper that wishes are written on, and is hung on bamboo or other trees during Tanabata.
- Tatarigami (祟り神) – Powerful evil spirits that bring calamity.
- Tate (盾, lit. 'shield') – A shield, sometimes dedicated to shrines, and indicative of a kami's power to ward-off and protect from negative influences.
- Tatsu (竜/龍, lit. 'Dragon') – A mythical creature that is seen as a symbol for great power, wisdom, leadership and success, and is said to bring strength, luck, and fortune.
- Tei (悌, lit. 'fraternity') – One of the virtues of bushido.
- Temizuya* (手水舎) – A fountain near the entrance of a shrine or at a Buddhist temple where worshipers can cleanse their hands and mouths before worship.
- Tenchi (天地, lit. 'heaven and earth') – A term referring to the union of opposites.
- Tendō (天堂, lit. 'heavenly hall') – Heaven, not unlike nirvana. Also known as Tengoku.
- Tengu (天狗) – A type of legendary creature found in Japanese folk religion. They are considered a type of yōkai or kami. The tengu were originally thought to take the forms of birds of prey, and they are traditionally depicted with both human and avian characteristics.
- Tengu-kakushi (天狗隠し) – A term used to refer to the mysterious disappearance or death of a person that happens when an angered tengu takes a person away.
- Tenjin (天神, lit. 'sky god') – The deification of Sugawara no Michizane (845–903). Originally worshiped as a weather kami, Tenjin later became a patron deity of academics, scholarship, learning and education, and the intelligentsia.
- Tenkan (天冠, lit. 'heavenly crown') – A design of golden-filigree crown worn by Buddha and celestial beings, such as tennyo. Also worn by imperial princesses in the Heian period. Now worn by miko during formal occasions such as festivals.
- Tenne (纏衣, lit. a "Wrapping Raiment" or "Heavenly Raiment") – Similar to the hagoromo.
- Tennin (天人, lit. 'heavenly person') – Divine beings found in Shinto and Japanese Buddhism that are similar to Western angels, nymphs, or fairies.
- Tennyo (天女, lit. 'heavenly woman') – Female tennin.
- Tensei/tenshō (転生) – Reincarnation.
- Tenshi (天使, lit. 'heavenly messenger') – Messenger tennin.
- Teru teru bōzu (照る照る坊主) – A small traditional handmade doll made of white paper or cloth that Japanese farmers began hanging outside of their window by a string. This talisman is supposed to have magical powers to bring good weather and to stop or prevent a rainy day.
- The tide jewels – The Kanju and the Manju; two magical gems that the sea kami Watatsumi or Ryūjin used to control the tides.
- Tokatsu Jigoku (等活地獄, lit. 'Hell of Revival') – The first and shallowest level of Jigoku, where sinners who have committed murder are sent.
- Torii (鳥居) – The Shinto gate at the entrance of a sacred area, usually a shrine. Also serves as the symbol for Shinto.
- Tori-no-Ichi (酉の市, lit. 'market of the rooster') – A festival in November.
- Tōrō (灯籠) – A lantern at a shrine or Buddhist temple.
- Toshidana (年棚, lit. 'Annum Shelf' or 'Annum Alter') – An altar specifically used for the New-Year, to commemorate a toshigami (below). Offerings include round cakes made of pounded rice, bottles of sake, persimmons, tangerines, etc. See also Kamidana (above).
- Toshigami – The kami of the year cycle.
- Toso (屠蘇) – A spiced medicinal sake, traditionally drunk during New Year celebrations in Japan.
- Totsuka-no-Tsurugi (十拳剣) – Any sword that is ten hand widths long. In Japanese mythology, numerous deities own a sword of this kind.
- Tsuina (追儺) – A type of ritual of exorcism, specifically one performed during a funeral, by a hōsōshi to keep away flesh-eating, corpse-stealing yōkai away from the body being buried. Tsuina shares its origins with Setsubun in Nuo rituals from China.
- Tsukimi (月見, lit. 'moon viewing') – A festival honouring the autumn moon. The celebration of the full moon typically takes place on the 15th day of the eighth month of the traditional Japanese calendar; the waxing moon is celebrated on the 13th day of the ninth month.
- Tsukubai (蹲踞) – A washbasin provided at the entrance to a holy place for visitors to purify themselves by the ritual washing of hands and rinsing of the mouth.
- Tsukumogami (付喪神) – yōkai who came to being from tools that have acquired a kami or spirit. According to the Ise Monogatari Shō, there is a theory originally from the Onmyōki (陰陽記) that foxes and tanuki, among other beings, that have lived for at a hundred years and changed forms are considered tsukumogami.
- Tsukuyomi-no-Mikoto (月読命 / 月読尊, lit. 'moon reader') – The kami of the moon, the son of Izanagi, the younger brother of Amaterasu Ōkami, and the older brother of Susanoo-no-Mikoto.
- Tsumairi or tsumairi-zukuri (妻入 or 妻入造, lit. 'Spouses Structure') – A style of construction in which the building has its main entrance on the side which runs perpendicular to the roof's ridge (gabled side).
- Tsumi (罪, lit. 'sin') – A violation committed against legal, social moral, ethical, or religious rules. It is most often used in the religious and moral sense. See also amatsu tsumi, kunitsu tsumi, imi, and kegare.
- Tsuru (鶴, lit. 'crane') – A species of bird that is native to Japan and to Japanese culture.
- Tsurushi-bina (吊るし雛/つるし雛, lit. 'Hanging Dolls') – Strings of hanging dolls, and all manner of auspicious symbols (cranes, turtles, etc.), that are a traditional decoration, like a hanging mobile, for Hinamatsuri. Also known as Sagemon (さげもん, lit. '"Hanging Thing"'), Sagarimono (さがりもの, lit. '"Hanging Thing"'), Tsurushi kazari (つるしかざり, lit. '"Hanging Decoration/Wreath"') and Kasafuku (傘福, lit. '"Umbrella [of] good luck"')

== U ==
- Ubusunagami (産土神, lit. 'birthplace deity') – A type of tutelary deity, a guardian god or spirit of a particular place in Shinto. The term ubusuna-mode (visiting one's own birth god) became widely used for visiting one's hometown and shrine. See also sore and ujigami.
- Uchide no kozuchi (打ち出の小槌) – Daikokuten's magic, lucky coin-stamping mallet.
- Ujigami (氏神, lit. 'clan deity') – A guardian god or spirit of a particular place in Shinto.
- Ukehi or Ukei (誓占) – A Shinto divination ritual.
- Ukemochi (保食神, lit. 'sustainable food deity') – The kami of food.
- Ushi no toki mairi (丑の時参り, lit. 'visit of the hour of the ox') – 1:00 am–3:00 am; the equivalent of the witching hour.
- Utsushimi (現身, lit. 'existing body') – A term for a visible, physical form (of a deity).
- Utsushiyo (現世, lit. 'existing world') – A term for a visible, physical world.

== W ==
- Waraningyō (藁人形) – Depending-upon their intended use, Wara-Ningyō can be used either for cleansing a person of sins and impurities, casting spells to protect or empower, or inflict a curse upon another person via ritual impalement. Originating from Taoist rituals, they are nailed to trees to curse people, during ushi no toki mairi.

== Y ==
- Yaku (厄, lit. 'misfortune') – The bad luck that one accumulates every day.
- Yakudoshi (厄年, lit. 'year of misfortune') – A period of time where a person experiences their own "age of calamity", where they will suffer misfortunes.
- Yama (夜摩) – Another name for Enma-Ō (閻魔王, lit. 'Evil Gates King'), the kami who oversees Naraku.
- Yamabushi (山伏) – A practitioner of shugendō.
- Yamajijii (山爺) – A male yōkai found in Japanese folklore and Noh.
- Yama-uba (山姥, lit. 'mountain crone') – A female yōkai found in Japanese folklore and Noh, and is most often described as a monstrous crone.
- Yamawaro (山童, lit. 'Mountain Child') – A childlike yōkai found in Japanese folklore and Noh.
- Yaoyorozu no kami (八百万の神, lit. 'eight million kami') – All kami.
- Yata no Kagami (八咫鏡) – A sacred mirror that is part of the Imperial Regalia of Japan. It is said to be housed in Ise Grand Shrine in Mie Prefecture, Japan. The Yata no Kagami represents wisdom or honesty, depending on the source.
- Yari (槍, lit. 'spear') – A spear, sometimes dedicated to shrines (along with other weapons, such as Katana and Naginata), and indicative of a kami's power to ward-off negative influences.
- Yashikigami (屋敷神) – A kami of a specific plot of land, house, household, etc.
- Yashiro (社) – A generic term for shrine, similar to jinja.
- Yōkai (妖怪) – An umbrella term that covers many supernatural beings, Yōkai can also be used when referring to humans, animals, objects, and even kami.
- Yōma (妖魔) – A type of ghost, phantom, apparition, monster, or demon.
- Yomi (黄泉, lit. 'Underworld') – The land of the dead; the afterworld, the underworld: according to Shinto mythology, as related in Kojiki, it is where the dead go in the afterlife.
- Yomotsu Hirasaka (黄泉比良坂 or 黄泉平坂) – the slope or boundary between the world of the dead (Yomi) and the world of the living. See also the Sanzu River.
- Yorishiro (依り代) – An object capable of attracting kami for a ceremony. Trees, rocks, magatama, gohei, and people can be yorishiro.
- Yorimashi (憑坐) – A human yorishiro, in particular a child or woman, used by a faith healer for oracles.
- Yoroi (鎧, lit. 'armour') – A suit of armour, sometimes dedicated to shrines, and indicative of a kami's power to protect from negative influences.
- Yū (勇, lit. 'courage') – One of the virtues of bushido.
- Yūki (幽鬼) – A type of demonic ghost or phantom; a demonic poltergeist. An onryō is a kind of yūki.
- Yūrei (幽霊) – A type of ghost or phantom. An onryō is a kind of yūrei.

== Z ==
- Zōni (雑煮) – A Japanese soup containing mochi rice cakes; associated with the Japanese New Year and its tradition of Osechi ceremonial foods.
- Zuijin (随身) – Kami warrior-guardian figures. They are often depicted to be holding bows and arrows, or wearing three silver rings. The name was originally applied to the bodyguards of the Emperor of Japan.
- Zukuri (造, lit. 'architecture') – A style of construction a building, that a shrine has usually been built in.

== Gallery: T to Z ==
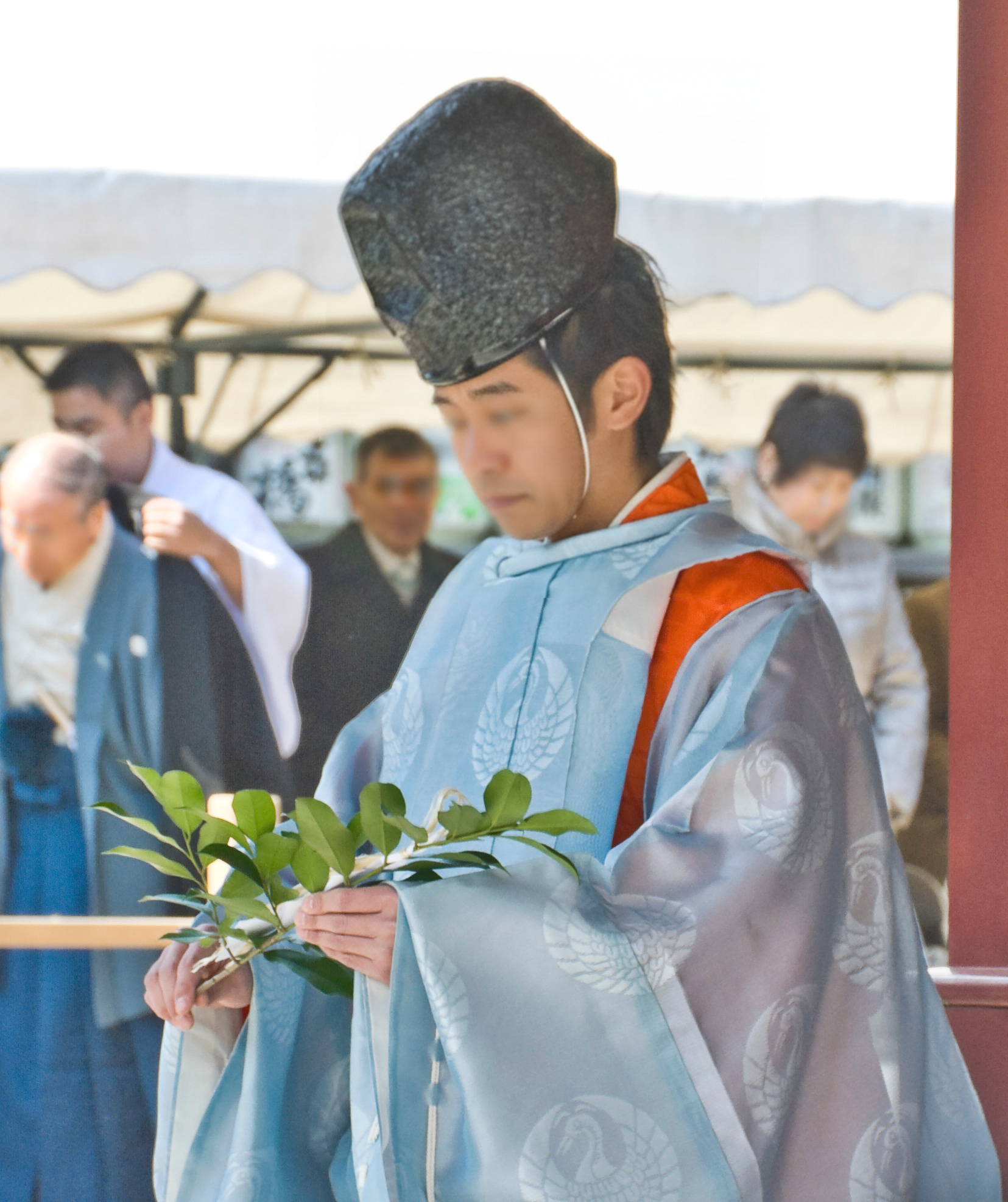
A kannushi holding a tamagushi

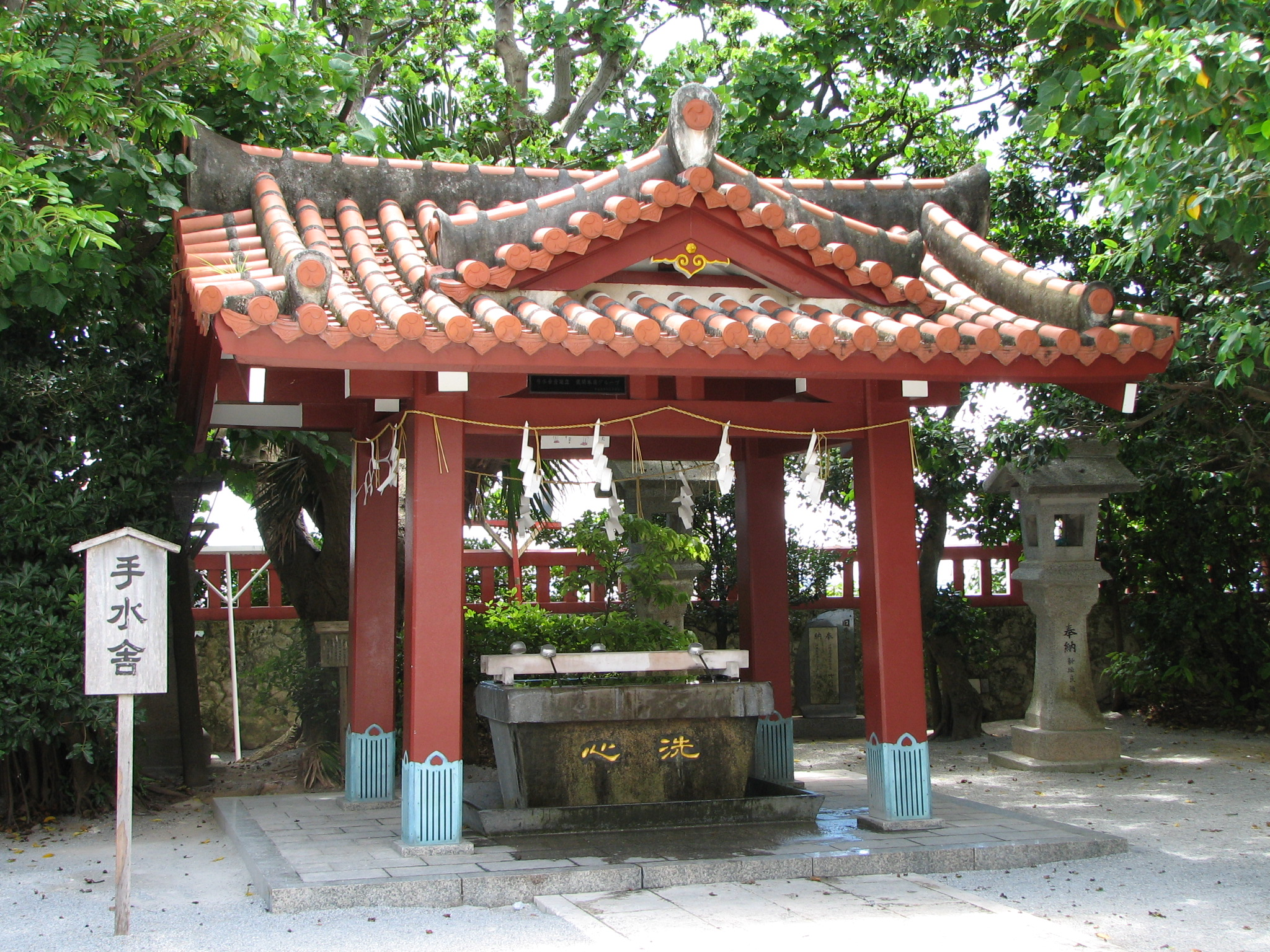
A temizuya

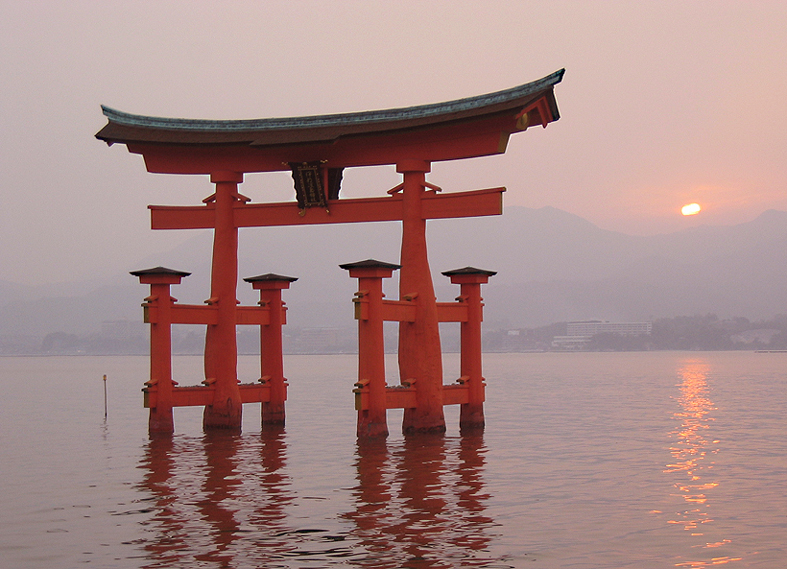
A torii

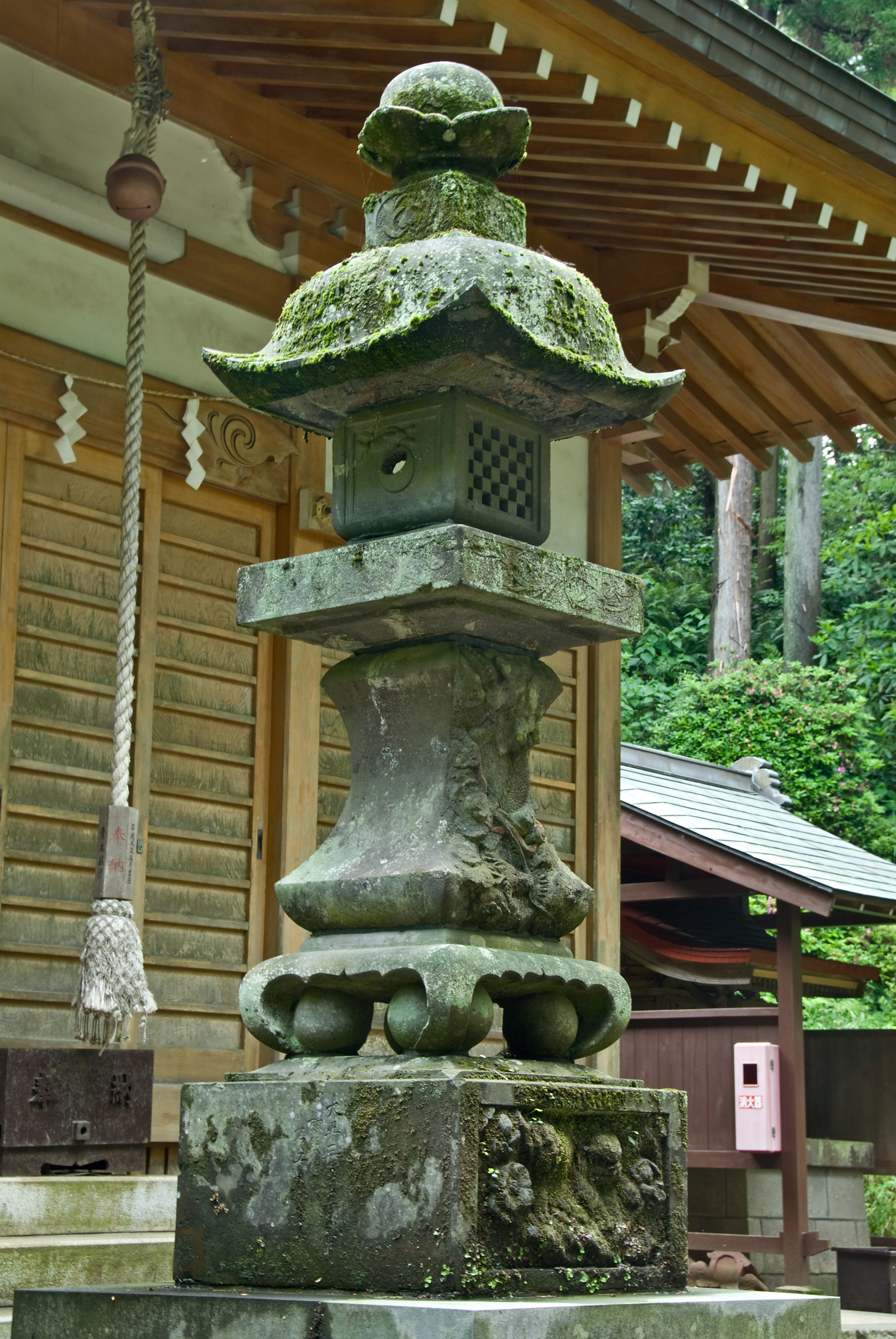
A tōrō

== See also ==
- Buddhism in Japan
- Glossary of Buddhism
- Glossary of Japanese Buddhism
- List of items traditionally worn in Japan
- List of Japanese deities
- List of sacred objects in Japanese mythology
- List of legendary creatures from Japan
- Japanese folklore
- Japanese folktales
- Japanese mythology
- Japanese superstitions
- Japanese urban legend
- Kaidan
- Kampo (Traditional Japanese Medicine)
- Shinto shrine
