= Yuji =

Yuji or Yu Ji may refer to:

- Yūji, a common masculine Japanese given name
- Yu Ji (painter), a Qing dynasty painter and calligrapher
- Consort Yu (Xiang Yu's wife) (虞姬; Yuji), the concubine of Xiang Yu, subject of the play Farewell My Concubine
- Gan Ji, a Taoist who lived in the late Han dynasty; his name was believed to be misspelled as "Yu Ji"
- 47077 Yuji, a main-belt asteroid

Towns in China

- Yuji, Wuqiao County (于集镇), in Wuqiao County, Hebei
- Yuji, Shangcheng County (余集镇), in Shangcheng County, Henan
- Yuji, Linghai (余积镇), in Linghai City, Liaoning
- Yuji, Liaocheng (于集镇), in Dongchangfu District, Liaocheng, Shandong

Townships in China

- Yuji Township, Funan County (于集乡), Anhui
- Yuji Township, Lingbi County (虞姬乡), in Lingbi County, Anhui
- Yuji Township, Ling County (于集乡), in Ling County, Shandong

Characters

- Yuji is the name of a character in Regular Show
- Yuji Itadori, the main character of the anime and manga series Jujutsu Kaisen

== See also ==
- Uji (disambiguation)
