= Uji (disambiguation) =

Uji (宇治) is a place in Kyoto Prefecture, Japan.

Uji or UJI may also refer to:

- Uji (clan) (氏), a Japanese kin group system of the Kofun period
- Uji (Being-Time) (有時), "Being-Time", a teaching of Zen master Dōgen
- Jaume I University (Valencian: Universitat Jaume I, Spanish: Universidad Jaume I), a university in Castellón de la Plana, Spain
- Uzi fly, or uji fly, any of a number of fly species that parasitize silkworms
- Uji, a Kenyan variant of ogi which is a West African fermented porridge made of cereal grain
- Two ships of Imperial Japanese Navy:
  - Japanese gunboat Uji (1903), a gunboat launched in 1903 and scrapped in 1936
  - Japanese gunboat Uji (1940), a Hashidate-class gunboat launched in 1940. She was transferred to the Republic of China as Chang Zhi in 1945. In 1949 she was captured by the People's Republic of China and renamed Nan Chang.

== See also ==
- Yuji (disambiguation)
