= Jingū taima =

Charm from Ise Jingu

Jingū Taima (神宮大麻, Jingū Taima or Jingū Ōnusa) is an ōnusa wrapped in clean Ise washi and issued by the Ise Grand Shrine. They are a form of ofuda. The Association of Shinto Shrines recommends every household have at least three Ofuda in their Kamidana, a Jingu Taima, an Ujigami ofuda, and another deity one personally chooses.

== History ==
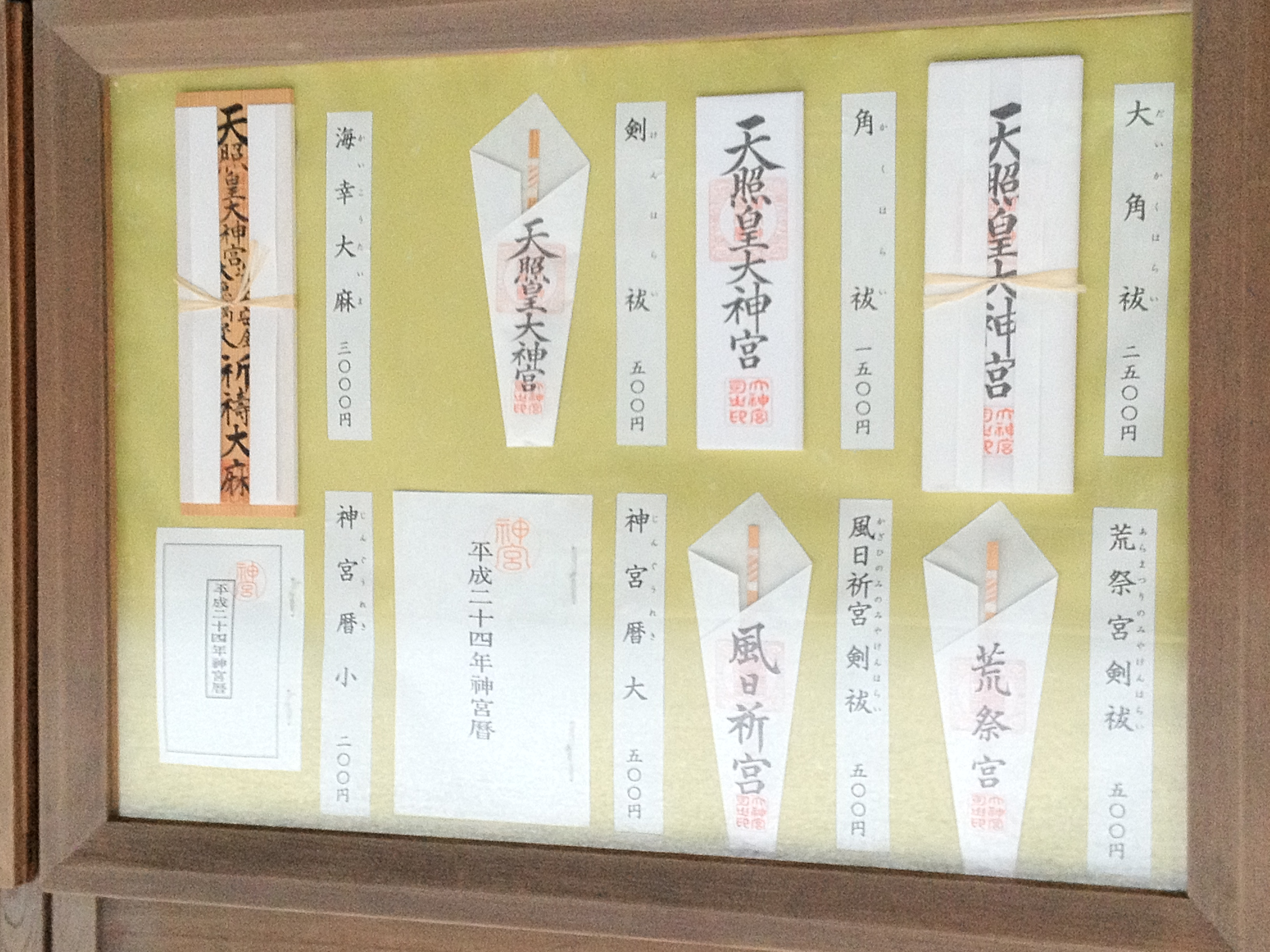
Different types of Jingū Taima (upper row) and other talismans distributed in the Inner Shrine (Naikū) of Ise. From left: Kaikō taima (海幸大麻) (a kind of kifuda for luck in fishing), kenharai (剣祓), kakuharai (角祓), and daikakuharai (大角祓) (a larger version of kakuharai).

Jingu Taima were originally purification wands (祓串, haraegushi) that wandering preachers associated with the shrines of Ise (御師, oshi or onshi) handed out to devotees across the country as a sign and guarantee that prayers were conducted on their behalf. These wands, called Oharai Taima (御祓大麻), were contained either in packets of folded paper – in which case they are called kenharai (剣祓) (also kenbarai), due to the packet's shape resembling a sword blade (剣, ken) – or in boxes called oharaibako (御祓箱). The widespread distribution of Oharai Taima first began in the Muromachi period and reached its peak in the Edo period: a document dating from 1777 (An'ei 6) indicates that eighty-nine to ninety percent of all households in the country at the time owned an Ise talisman.

Originally, the taima (exorcism skewer) used in the exorcism prayer was wrapped in Japanese paper and delivered to the recipient as a proof that the goshi had performed the exorcism prayer. Eventually, Pilgrimage to Ise and other Kosha were organized and distributed. During the Goshi period, exorcism sticks were distributed either in a box or wrapped in a sword-shaped omochi.

=== Medieval and Early modern periods ===
During the Muromachi era, the distribution of taima became widely practiced. During this period, the Goshishi of Ise made the rounds of parishioners, and prayers such as the 10,000-times exorcism were offered to the shogun and others, but generally the equivalent of the Edo period sword exorcism was distributed Various items were distributed along with the taima, which gradually settled on the Ise calendar. In the Edo period, taima for purification included 10,000-degree purification, 5,000-degree purification, 1,000-degree purification, and sword purification, with sword purification distributed to the general public. There also existed 10,000-degree Kagura taima, 10,000-degree 100-day taima, and 5,000-degree Kagura taima. O-harai-taima-harae-gu (御祓大麻祓具) was used to make o-harai-taima (御祓大麻) at the place where the priest went. In preparing the exorcisms, the priests performed other celebratory rites and prayer texts in addition to the Nakatomi exorcisms, and these deities were enshrined as Shinmeisho and other places.

During the Muromachi period, taima became widely distributed. During this period, the master of Ise went around the Danka system, and prayers such as the 10,000 degree ritual were performed on the shogunate, but in general, the sword ritual of the Edo period. The equivalent of the sword was distributed. Various items were distributed along with taima, which gradually became established in the Ise calendar. In the Edo period, there were 10,000-degree rituals, 5,000-degree rituals, 1,000-degree rituals, and sword rituals, and sword rituals were generally distributed. There were also 10,000 degree kagura taima, 10,000 degree 100 day taima, and 5,000 degree kagura taima. Oharaita Imaharaegu was used to make taima at the place where the master went. These destinations were enshrined as Shinmeisho, etc., because they played other congratulatory words and prayer sentences in the preparation of the Oharae.

People rushed to Ise Jingu Shrine in record numbers every 60 years from 1650 to 1830, and there was a great deal of noise about money falling from the heavens and illnesses being cured In February 1830, Awa, money fell from heaven, and by August, nearly five million worshippers had flocked to Ise Jingu Shrine. Matsumura Keibun painted "The descent of the taima from the Shrines", which is in the collection of Jingu Chokokan Museum.

=== Modern Period ===
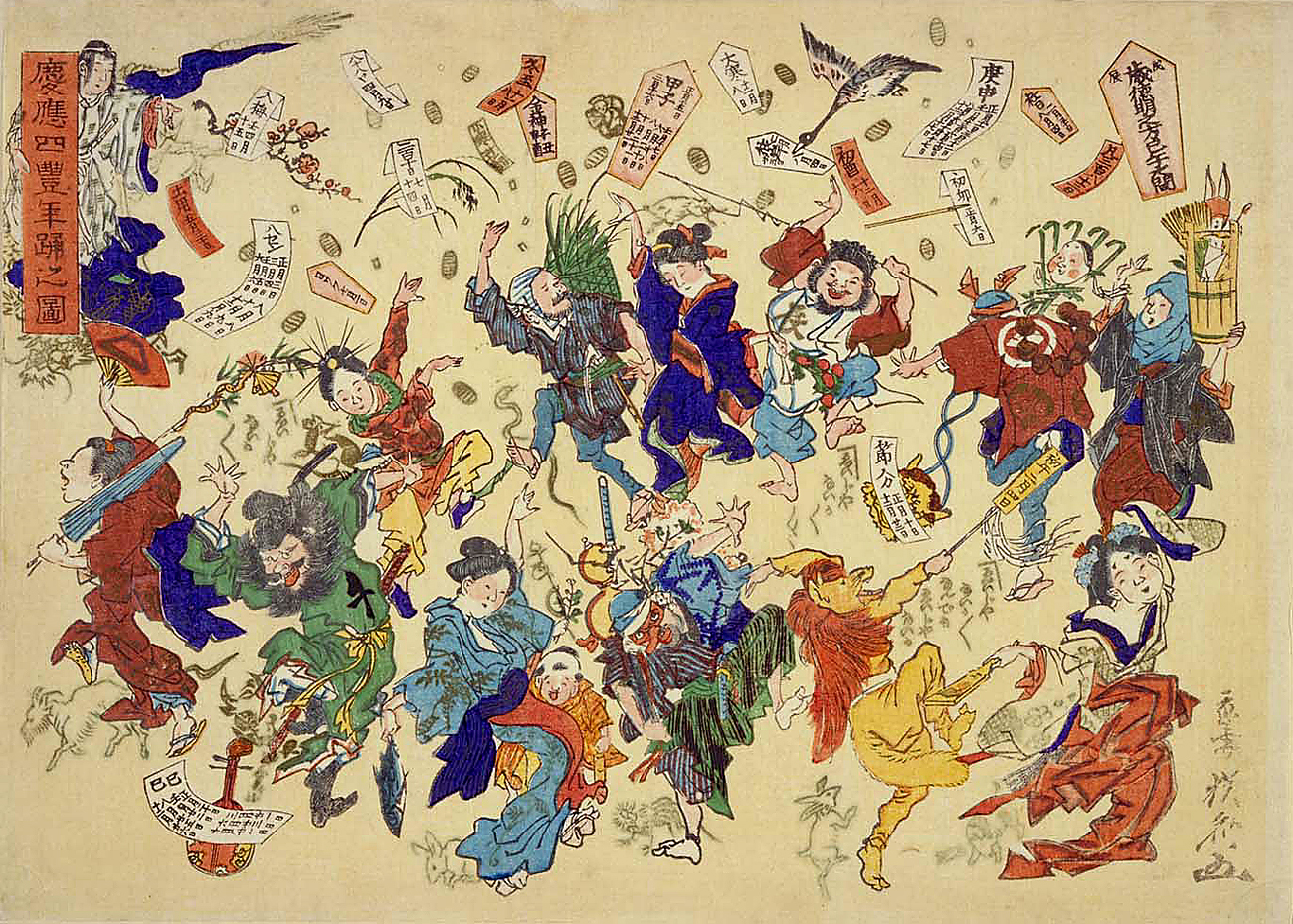
The end of the Edo period witnessed the rise of public festivities and protests known as ee ja nai ka triggered by reports of talismans raining from the sky.

In 1871, an imperial decree abolished the oshi and allotted the production and distribution of the amulets, now renamed Jingu Taima, to the shrine's administrative offices. It was around this time that the talisman's most widely known form – a wooden tablet containing a sliver of cedar wood known as gyoshin (御真, "sacred core") wrapped in paper on which is printed the shrine's name (天照皇大神宮, Amaterasu-ōmikami-jingū) and stamped with the seals of the shrine (皇大神宮御璽, Kōtai Jingū Gyoji) and its high priest (大神宮司之印, Daijingūji no In) – developed. In 1900, a new department, the Kanbesho (神部署, "Department of Priests"), took over production and distribution duties. The distribution of Jingu Taima was eventually delegated to the National Association of Shinto Priests (全国神職会, Zenkoku Shinshokukai) in 1927 and finally to its successor, the Association of Shinto Shrines, after World War II. The Association nowadays continues to disseminate Jingu Taima to affiliated shrines throughout Japan, where they are made available alongside the shrines' own amulets.

According to the explanation of Ise Grand Shrine Guji (chief priest) Urada Nagatami in 1873, it was the distribution of Ōnusa, a sacred object to ward off sin.

After the Meiji Era (1868-1912), it was transformed into a Shinto taima with the Privy Seal of Japan stamped on it. Since then, it has been wrapped as Goshin, the sacred body of the shrine. In the Meiji period, the system of goji was suspended with the formation of State Shinto and distributed throughout the country from the Jingu-kyo organized by the Ise Jingu from Ise-ko. From the Meiji era to the present, all Jingu taima has been consistently produced within Ise Jingu, and is distributed by the Jingu-kyo, then by the Jingu Bohoninkai Foundation, and later by the Association of Shinto Shrines.

According to the 1916 explanation by the Jingu Shinbusho, it originated in Harae, an event that is now a prayer for the nation's people, and is therefore not a shintai or wakemitamama, but rather a mark of veneration. These arguments attempted to encompass the various beliefs of the time, but it was also an exorcism tool because it was offered as an offering to the gods, the spirit was attached to it and it became a sacred object, and it was also a prayer for purification. It is said that we should not choose one over the other.

== Varieties and usage ==
Shinsatsu such as Jingu Taima are enshrined in a household altar (kamidana) or a special stand (ofudatate); in the absence of one, they may be placed upright in a clean and tidy space above eye level or attached to a wall. Shinsatsu and the kamidana that house them are set up facing east (where the sun rises), south (the principal direction of sunshine), or southeast.

The Association of Shinto Shrines recommends that a household own at least three kinds of shinsatsu:

1. Jingu Taima
2. The ofuda of the tutelary deity of one's place of residence (ujigami)
3. The ofuda of a shrine one is personally devoted to sūkei jinja (崇敬神社)

Various possible ways of arranging ofuda (shinsatsu) in a Shinto altar

In a 'three-door' style (三社造, sansha-zukuri) altar, the Jingu Taima is placed in the middle, with the ofuda of one's local ujigami on its left (observer's right) and the ofuda of one's favourite shrine on its right (observer's left). Alternatively, in a 'one-door' style (一社造, issha-zukuri) kamidana, the three talismans are laid on top of one another, with the Jingu Taima on the front. One may own more shinsatsu; these are placed on either side of or behind the aforementioned three. Regular (preferably daily) worship before the shinsatsu or kamidana and offerings of rice, salt, water, and/or sake to the kami (with additional foodstuffs being offered on special occasions) are recommended. The manner of worship is similar to those performed in shrines: two bows, two claps, and a final bow, though a prayer (norito) - also preceded by two bows - may be recited before this.

== Onshi ==
Although there have been examples of purification ceremonies performed since the Heian and Kamakura periods, the earliest known example of the word "purification" is said to be a prayer performed by Minamoto no Yoritomo, described in Azuma Kagami (Azuma Mirror), August 16, 1180, in which he performed "1,000 times purification"

The exorcism is given to the recipient after the prayer. Nakatomi-no-harae was recited, and this became the name of the sacred card.

At that time, when the common people wanted to worship Ise Jingu, they had no choice but to perform purification through an oshi (priest) and play kagura (Shinto music and dance).

As the activities of the Goshi grew, he dispatched deputies to the provinces.

== Purification skewer ==
Generally, the "Ohanusa" used for purification consists of a sakaki with Shide and ramie, or only with shidare attached, and at Ise Shrine, only with ramie attached.

Although the ancient sword-purification type of Jingu Omasha is also distributed at Ise Jingu Shrine, those distributed at various shrines throughout Japan are in the tag form. In kaku exorcism, it is wrapped in hemp ramie (string-like fiber).

=== The eight-needle skewer ===
The priest would set up a skewer tied to a plan called a hakusokuan (eight foot plan), which was used during dosubarae (purification by degrees). At the back of the top of the plan, a piece of paper for money and a piece of sugama the eight-hari skewer with a piece of paper and a piece of Suga hemp is set up at the back of the top of the plan. The eight-foot plan can fit in a box and is portable. This is called yakura-oki shinji, which is similar to the annual festival of the Ise Jingu shrine.

This was a closely guarded secret that was not to be taken west of the Miyagawa River, but in 1852 it was discovered at Isedono Shrine in Saitama Prefecture.

=== Hashiri-shushi ===
The goji (priest) set up a bound purification skewer called an yashigushi (still gushi) on a plan called a hakusokuan, which was used during dosuubarae. An eight-foot-long skewer with a piece of paper for Shinto paper and Sugamasa is set up at the back on top of the draft. The Hachisoku Draft can be stored in a box and is portable. This is called yakura-oki shinji, which is similar to the annual festival of the Ise Jingu shrine.

This was a closely guarded secret not to be taken west of the Miyagawa River, but in 1852 it was discovered at the Isedono Shrine in Saitama Prefecture.

=== Jingu Omamasa no Mikoto ===
The Goshin in the Jingu Daima is also called Exorcism skewer (祓串, Haraigushi) or Hemp skewer (麻串, Asakushi)

=== Mamori-Harai ===
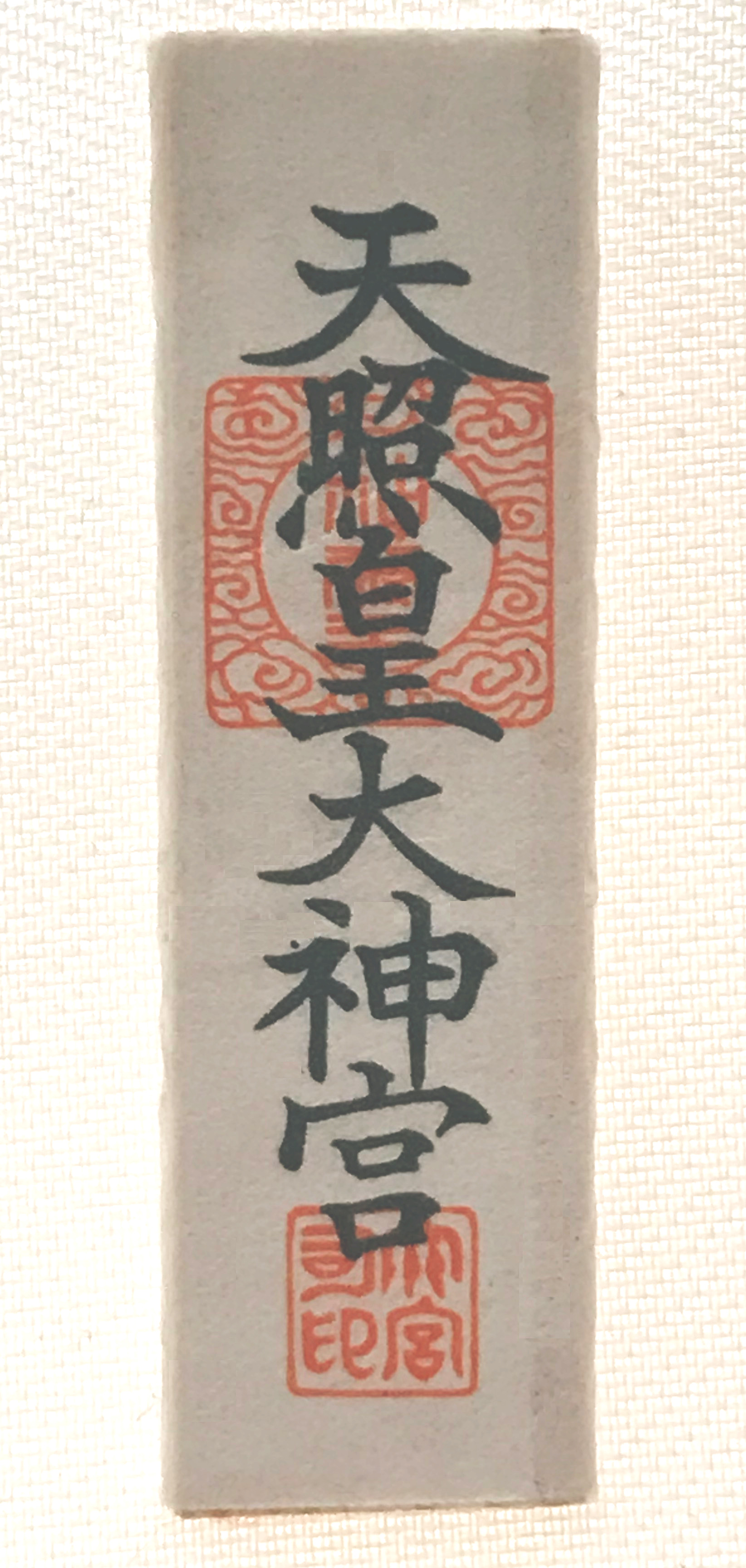
Mamori-Harai at the Inner Shrine of Ise Jingu

Mamori-Harai (守(まもり)祓(はらい)) is a small sacred card inside an amulet. Only Mamori-Harai for each shrine in Ise can be purchased and put together in one amulet bag.

== The Imperial Seal and taima ==
=== Cessation and Reform of the Goshishi System ===
In the Meiji era (1868-1912), the activities of the Goshishi ceased in the process of establishing State Shinto.

The Imperial Grand Shrine at Ise, Oharai-cho, just before the Uji Bridge, was once the site of the Goshishi's residence.

On December 18, 1871, the High priest of Ise Jingu Ministry of Divinities requested that taima be stamped with the divine name of "Amaterasu" and "Imperial Seal of the Imperial Grand Shrine" and distributed universally under the responsibility of Ministry of Divinities, which the ministry approved. In January of the following year, the taima Manufacturing Bureau was established, and in April, the taima distribution rules were established. On April 1, the "Privy Seal of Japan" was held, and Omiya Tsukasa's Kitakoji Zumitsu played the distribution of taima as a privy seal.

In the "Jingu Omasho Shiki" (Jingu Shrine Omasha Enshrinement Ceremony) of December 1873 (Meiji 6), Nagatami Urada, a minor shrine priest, stated that people should worship every morning and evening in order to eliminate sins and impurities by facing and worshipping Omasha, a sacred object distributed annually from the shrine to ward off sins.

On December 18, 1871 (Meiji 4), the priest of Ise Jingu Omiya stamped the name of the taima on the Shinto ministry as "Tensho Emperor Daijingu" and "Ise Grand Shrine Privy" at the responsibility of the Jingu Shrine. The Ministry of Divinities approved this, asking for a uniform distribution. In January of the following year, the taima Manufacturing Bureau was established, and in April, the taima distribution rules were established. On April 1, the "Privy Seal of Japan" was held, and Omiya Tsukasa Kitakoji Zumitsu played the distribution of taima as a large privy seal. At the "Jingu Taima Dedication Ceremony" in December 1873 (Meiji 6), Chomin Urata, the priest of the shrine, worships at the taima as a sacred tool that dispels the sins distributed from the shrine every year. It states that we should worship every morning and evening in order to exhaust the impurities.

=== Change of distributor ===
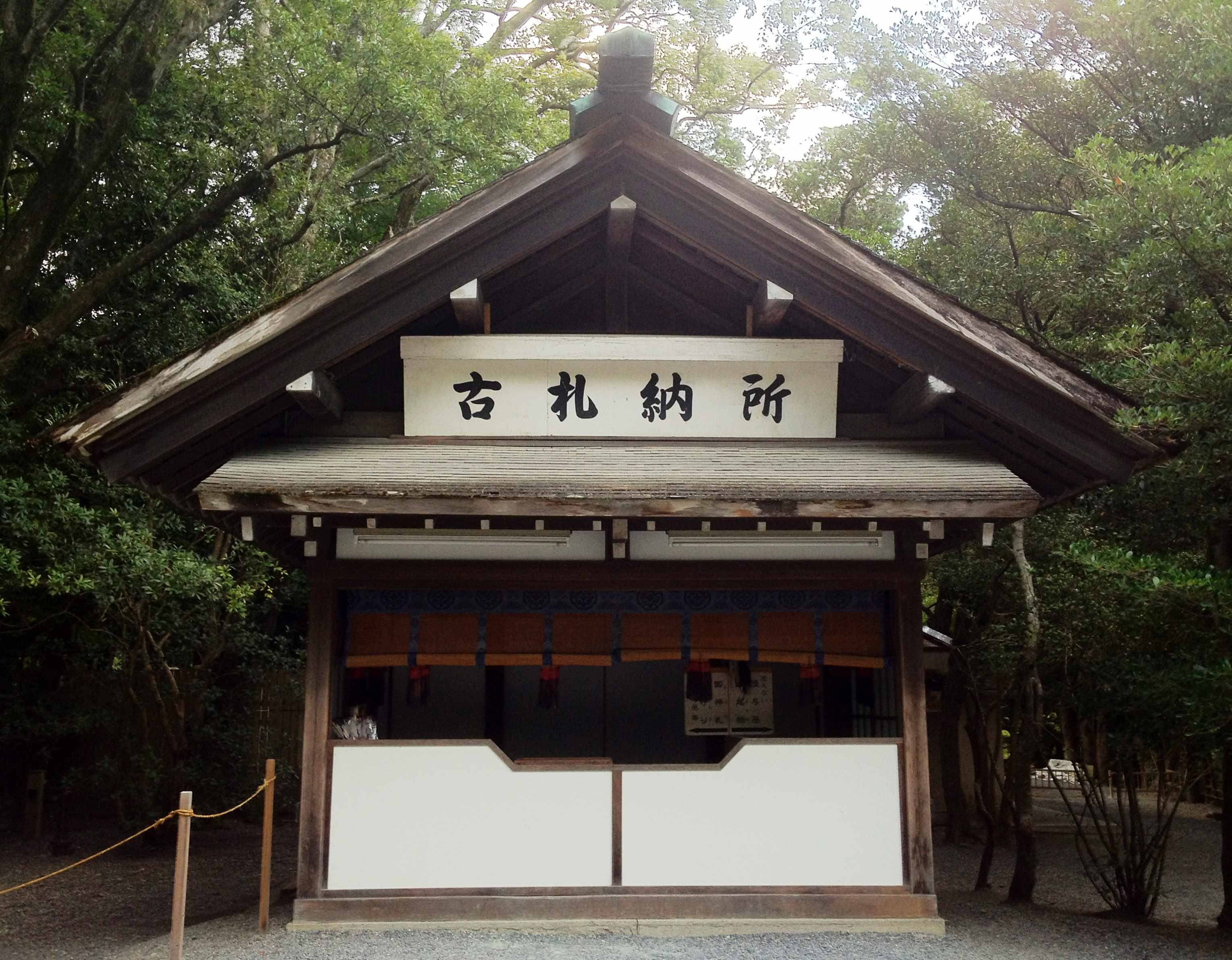
Ancient card storage near the entrance to the Imperial Grand Shrine at Ise Grand Shrine

The Jingu-kyoin was opened in 1873, and Article 5 of the Jingu-kyoin Regulations of February 1876 indicates that the distribution of Jingu-taima is its main business.

After the notification of 1878 (Meiji 11), the method of distribution was changed frequently.

There is also a large, thick, and thickly presented taima in a wooden box that is presented to the imperial family and former emperors.

In 1882, when the Jingu-kyoin became independent as the Shinto Jingu-ha and further became the Jingu-kyo, the distribution of taima was entrusted to the Jingu-kyo. In 1898 (Meiji 31), Jingu-kyo became Jingu Bonshinkai, and distribution was entrusted to this organization.

Article 21 of the 1882 Shinto Shrine Office Kyōin Classification and Article 7(7) of the 1899 Ministry of the Interior Instruction No. 823 legally prohibited these conflations because the distributed taima has a portion that prays for the emperor or imperial family, but the conferred taima does not.

The distributing taima blesses the dedicator under the Imperial Guard. According to Article 21 of the Jingu Shrine Academy Division in 1882 and Article 7 (7) of the Ministry of Interior Lesson No. 823 of 1899 (Meiji 32), the distributed taima has a part to pray for the emperor and the imperial family. Since there is no such confusion, these confusions are legally prohibited. Distribution taima protects stoners under the patronage of the empire.

The significance of the freedom of worship was advocated, and it was explained by the Jingu Shrine department in 1916 (Taisho 5), but the origin of Jingu taima is Onusa. It was Harae by Norito, and now it is an event that prays to the national people, so it is a Shintai or a spirit. It is not, therefore, not something like Honzon , but a mark for worship, so it does not conflict with religious freedom.

However, the congratulatory rites of the early 21st century, even those distributed by the ministry, read, "We have dedicated the Taima, so we will offer it before the gods and hold a purification ceremony, so let the spirits of the dead come to this Taima. The theory from the Taisho era to the prewar Showa era denies the existence of the Spirit, and says that it is a symbol of far-off worship. However, there are various theories, such as mihakubaku, exorcism tools, kintai, and symbols, which attempt to include various beliefs of the time. It is said that one should not choose any of them.

In 2003, the "Jingu Taima Historical Materials Mysterious Revised First Edition" of the Jingu Shrine Education Division was published, and the following year, the "Study Group Report on Jingu Taima" of the Association of Shinto Shrine Education Division was published. The number of taima distributed in 2011 was 8,885,545.

== See also ==
- Jingu calendar
- Washi
- Omamori
- Senjafuda
- Fulu (Chinese paper charm or spell)
- Thai Buddha amulet
- Holy card
- Himmelsbrief
- Murti

== Bibliography ==
- 寺本慧達編 (1930). 神宮大麻調査文献. 東林書房.
- 当山春三 (1916). 神宮大麻と国民性. 神宮奉斎会本部.
- 西川順土 (1988). 近代の神宮. 神宮教養叢書第9. 神宮司庁.
- 三好和義 (2003). 伊勢神宮. 日本の古社. 岡野弘彦ほか. 淡交社. ISBN 978-4473031082.
- 足立康 (May 1926). "伊勢の御師の活動". 神社協会雑誌. 25 (5): 4–12.
- 大野由之 (March 2014). "Jingū no Taima ni Tsuite: Tanjō no Haikei to Seishitsu no Sōkan" 神宮の大麻について : 誕生の背景と性質の相関 [About Jingū Taima: How It Came to Be and How Its Qualities Interrelate]. Kōgakkan Shintō Kenkyūjo Kiyō 皇學館大学神道研究所紀要 [Kōgakkan University Shinto Institute Journal]. 30: 187–230.
- 松平乘昌 (2008). 図説 伊勢神宮. 河出書房新社. ISBN 978-4309761176.
