= Hossu =

Wooden staff wielded by a Zen Buddhist priest

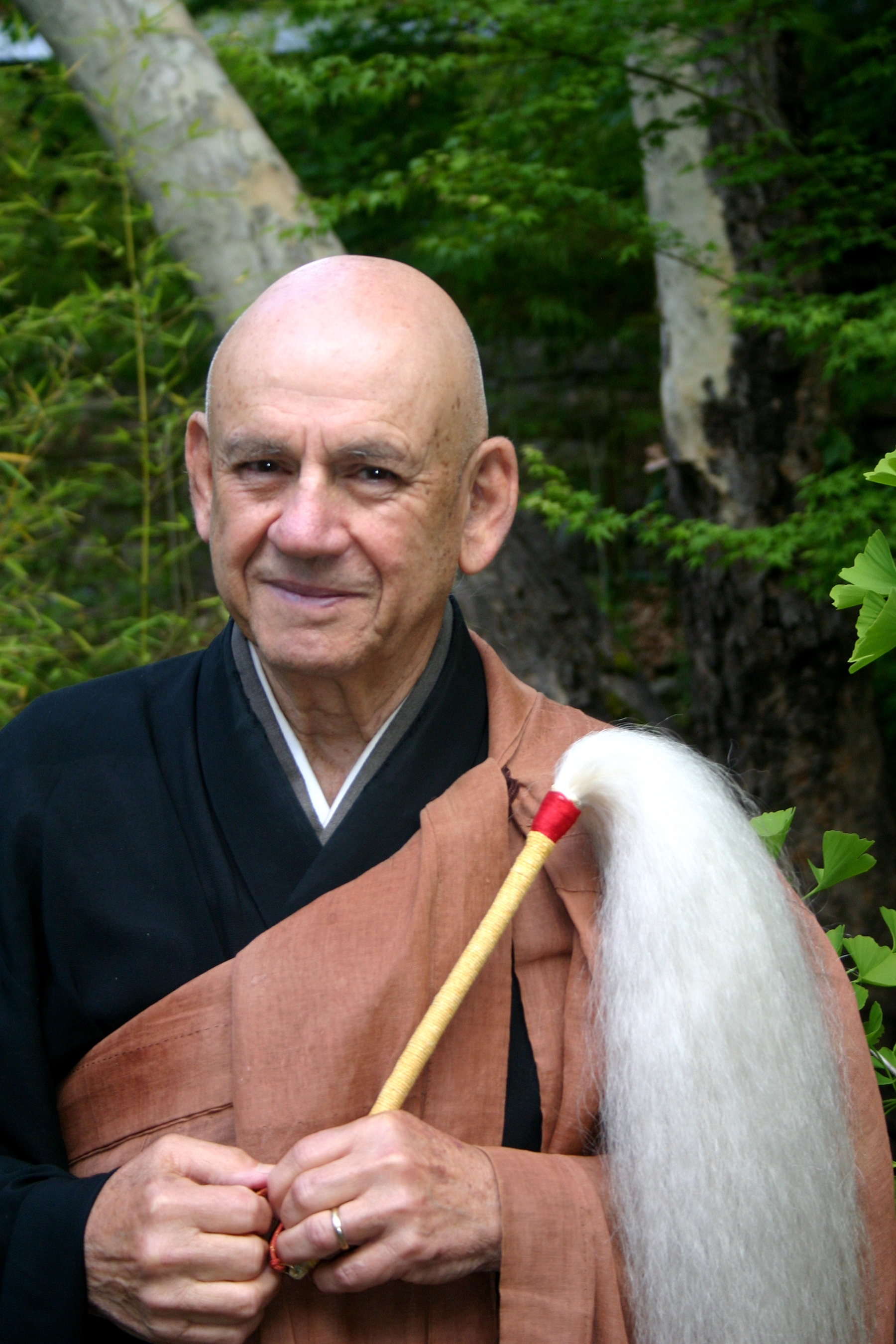
Sojun Mel Weitsman wielding a hossu

A hossu (払子, Chinese: Fuzi, 拂子; Sanskrit: vālavyajana) is a short staff of wood or bamboo with bundled hair (of a cow, horse, or yak) or hemp wielded by a Zen Buddhist priest. Often described as a "fly-whisk" or "fly shooer", the stick is believed to protect the wielder from desire and also works as a way of ridding areas of flies without killing them. The hossu is regarded as symbolic of a Zen teacher's authority to teach and transmit Buddha Dharma to others, and is frequently passed from one teacher to the next.

== See also ==
- Inau, wooden wands used in Ainu rituals
- Gunbai
- Ruyi (scepter)
- Saihai
- Shaku
- Ōnusa
- Hu
- Gohei
