= Gohei =

Shinto wand

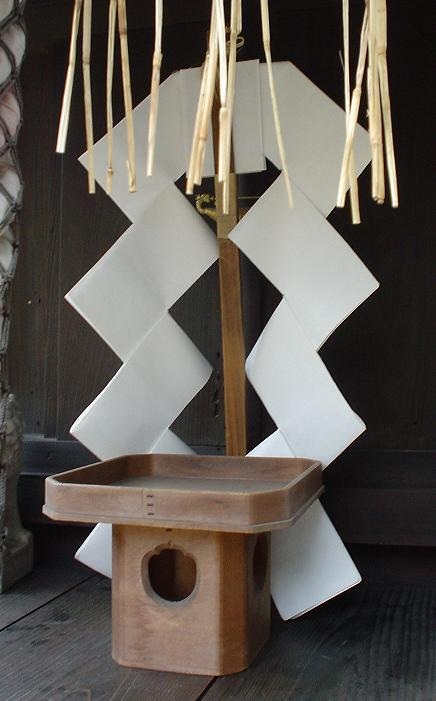
Gohei in front of Shinto shrine

Gohei (御幣), onbe (御幣), or heisoku (幣束) are wooden wands, decorated with two shide (zigzagging paper streamers) used in Shinto rituals. It may be considered an Ōnusa with only two Shide.

The streamers are usually white, although they can also be gold, silver, jade, or a mixture of several colors, and are often attached as decorations to straw ropes (shimenawa) used to mark sacred precincts.

The shrine priest or attendants (miko) use the gohei to bless or sanctify a person or object in various Shinto rituals. The gohei is used for some ceremonies, but its usual purpose is to cleanse a sacred place in temples and to cleanse, bless, or exorcise any object that is thought to have negative energy. In addition to its use in purification rituals, it may be included in an ōnusa (wooden wand with many shide), and serve as the object of veneration (shintai) in a Shinto shrine. The gohei developed from the older practice of mitegura, cloth offerings tied to a ceremonial staff and presented to the kami; over time, the rectangular sheets of cloth or paper were replaced by the folded zigzag streamers (shide) attached to the sides of the staff. The Engishiki's norito texts classify such offerings (heihaku) into clothing, weapons, sake (omiki), and food offerings (shinsen); this classification was later simplified to cloth offerings (yū and nigite) and the gohei itself. Historically, the gohei could also be placed inside a shrine's sanctuary as a mishōtai (a physical vessel for the kami's spirit), positioned before the kami as a decorative object comparable to a mirror, or used as an implement to purify worshippers.

A type of food called Goheimochi is thought to have been named after the staff.

== See also ==
- Flail
- Glossary of Shinto for an explanation of terms concerning Japanese Shinto, Shinto art, and Shinto shrine architecture.
- Inau, wooden wands used in Ainu rituals
- Gunbai
- Ruyi (scepter)
- Saihai
- Shaku
- Ōnusa
- Hu
- Hossu
