= Inau =

Ainu ritual wood-shaving stick

In Ainu culture, inau or inaw (Ainu: イナウ or イナゥ) is a ritual wood-shaving stick used in prayers to the spiritual world. They were used in most Ainu religious rituals and were also frequently made to request assistance for hunting and childbirth. Some can be used multiple times, while others are destroyed immediately after one use. Their size and the direction in which they are shaved depends on which kamuy (spiritual being) it is offered to and what is being requested.

== Etymology ==
The word inau appears to be a loanword from other languages in the region, probably the Tungusic Orok language of Sakhalin (Orok: illau from earlier *ilawun). It is most likely ultimately related to the Manchu terms ᡳᠯᠠᠮᠪᡳ(ila-mbi, 'to blossom') and ᡳᠯᡥᠠ (ilha, 'flower'). The Nivkh word inau or nau is most likely a loanword from the same Tungusic source via Ainu; both Tungusic languages and Nivkh have an /l/ sound, which the Ainu language lacks, so the replacement of /l/ with /n/ is probably an artifact of Ainu phonology.

== Description ==
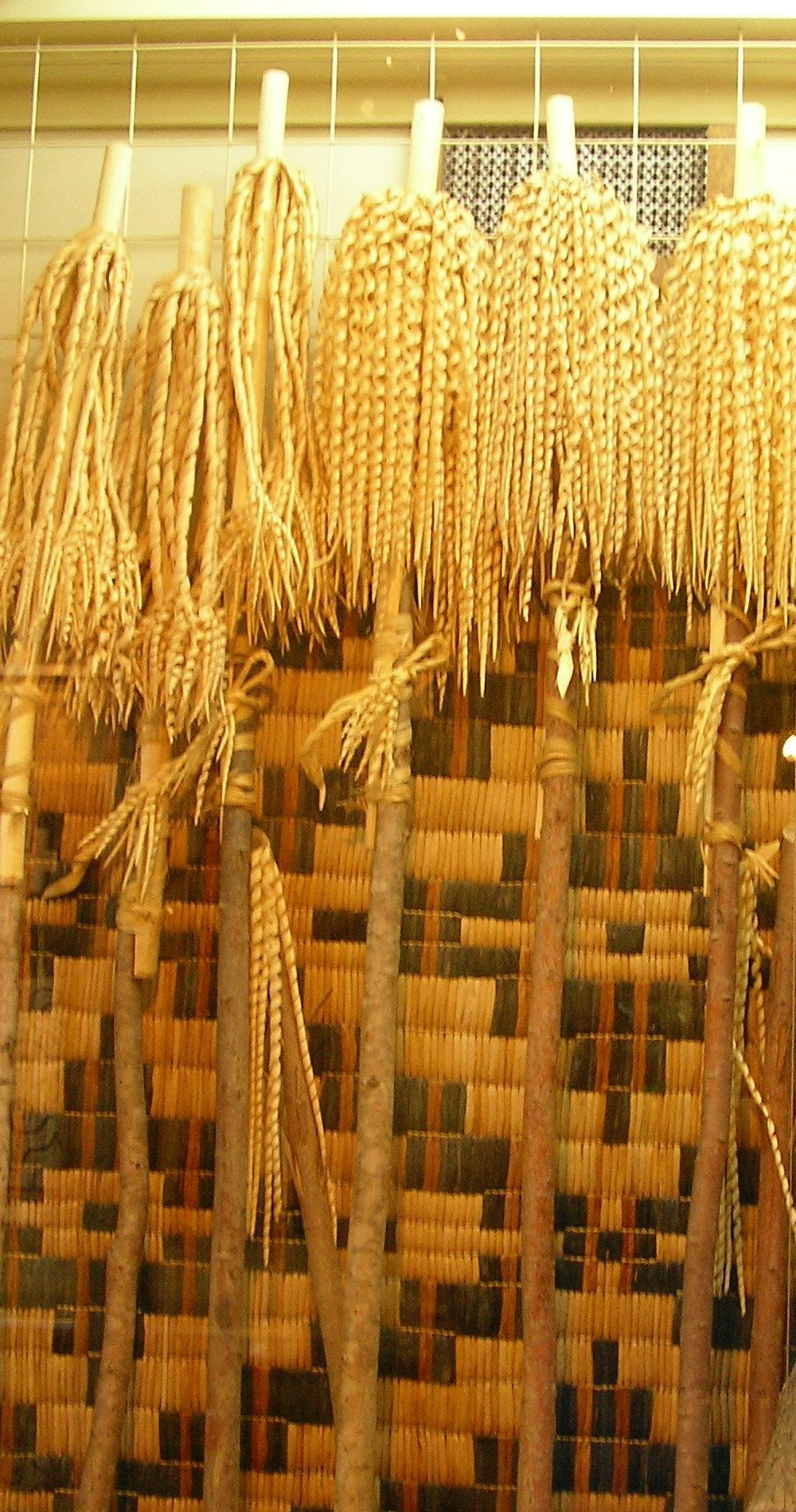
Inau sticks

To make inau, the bark of a branch is first peeled and then a knife called an inawke-makiri is repeatedly used to shave the wood into thin curled strips that form a tuft. Inau are usually anywhere from five inches (13 cm) to one foot (30 cm) in length. There are several different types of inau, all with different variations in length and thickness depending on purpose. Certain types of wood were also used depending on the inau's purpose. Willow was exclusively used for offerings to good kamuy, and is preferred for this purpose, although a few other woods could be used if necessary. These inau tend to be about one foot (30 cm) long. Conversely, inau made to repel illnesses and evil spirits (called wen inau) were typically made from alder, and are usually around eight inches (20 cm) long. Some inau also have wings attached to them, although it is unclear exactly what function they served. The number of wings varies by region; Ainu from southern Hokkaido typically made them with nine wings, while further north they were made with six or seven. Inau also have shavings attached to them. Most point upwards, although chiahorokakepe or chehorokakep (Ainu: チアホロカケペ or チェホロカケㇷ゚, literally 'the thing shaven backward') have them pointed downward, making them very distinct from other inau. In addition, certain kinds of inau – such as Chikube-ni inau – are equipped with spears.

== Uses ==
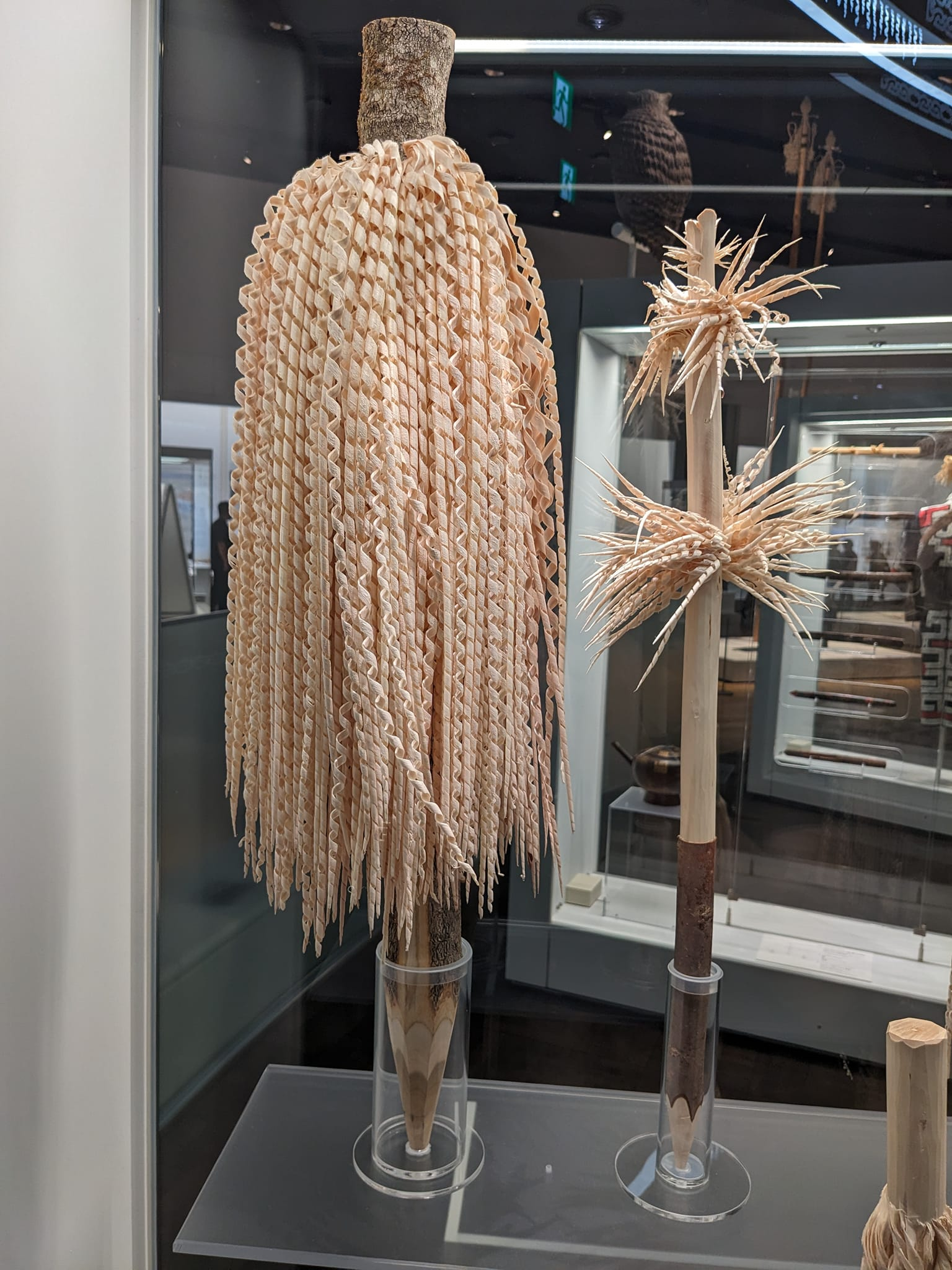
Examples of inau at the National Ainu Museum

With the exception of funerals, for which they were never made, inau were an important part of rituals involving kamuy. Because only men were permitted to participate in religious rituals besides the bear ceremony, only men could make inau. Before building a house, four inau and one chiahorokakepe were placed where the hearth was to be built. Every Ainu house had inau on the hearth in honor of Kamuy Fuchi (known in Sakhalin Ainu as Unci Kamuy), and during Ainu housewarming ceremonies, three to four additional chiahorokakepe were typically placed on the hearth. Inau were also made to requests assistance from progressively more powerful kamuy during exorcism rituals and difficult childbirths.

In addition to personal use, inau were also used in larger ceremonies. Ainu bear ceremonies featured a large number of inau, of all different kinds. Certain elders, known as ekashi, would also use inau in ceremonies to control the weather. Inau were also used by hunters both before and during a hunt to bring good luck.

Inau made for curing diseases were dismantled immediately after their purpose was served. Keeping them for any longer than was absolutely necessary was considered extremely dangerous, and it was thought they could cause a great deal of harm to the person who made them. Conversely, inau made to more benevolent kamuy were not so quickly destroyed.

== See also ==
- Chichilaki
- Ikupasuy
- Flail
- Glossary of Shinto
- Gohei – wooden wands used in Shinto rituals
- Harae
- Hu
- Gunbai
- Ōnusa – Shinto version of the inau
- Saihai
- Ruyi
