= Kanjō =

Ritual enshrinement of a Kami

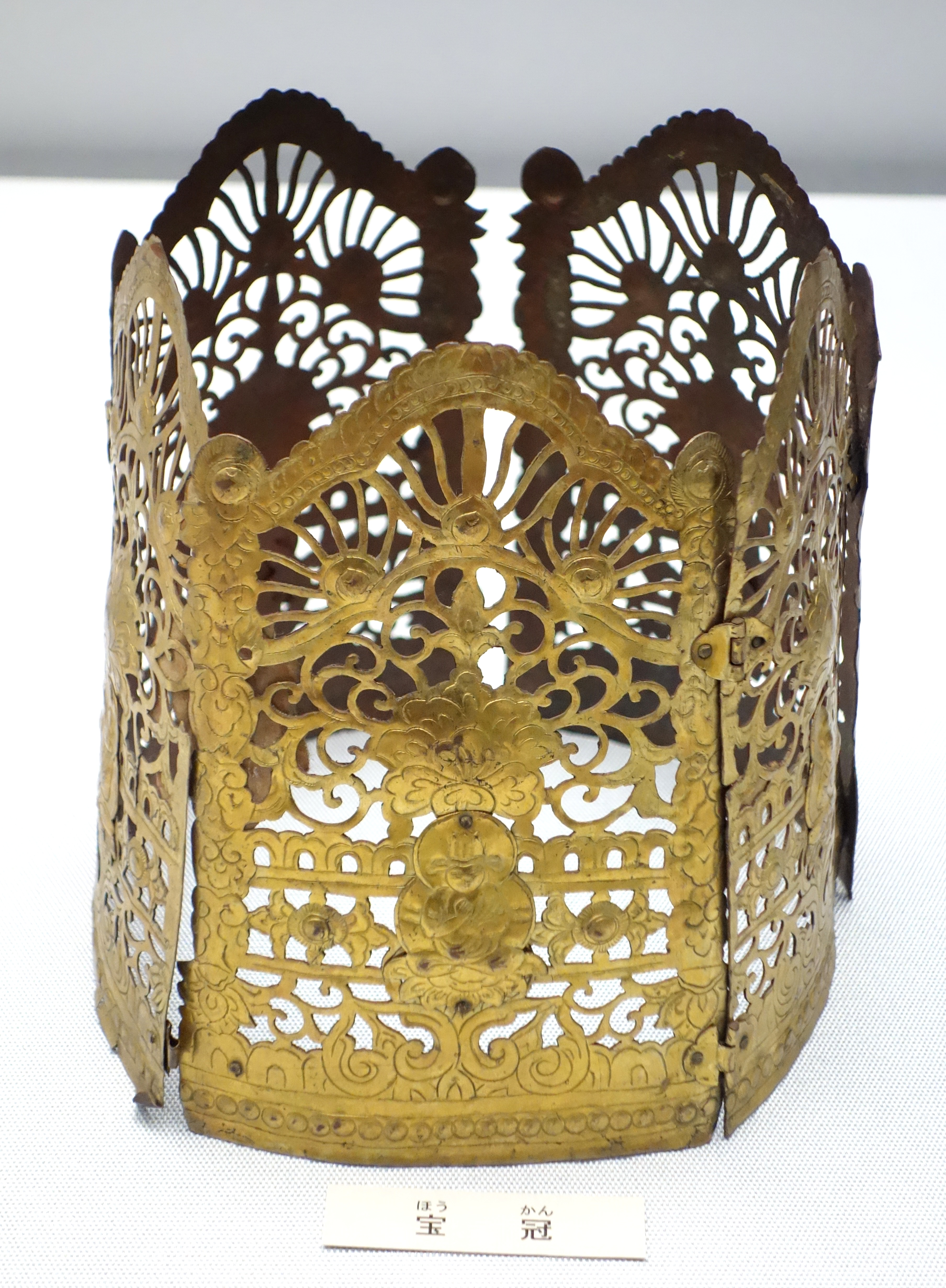
Kanjō ritual crown, Kamakura-Edo period (13th-17th century)

Kanjō (勧請) in Shinto terminology indicates a propagation process through which a kami, previously divided through a process called bunrei, is invited to another location and there re-enshrined.

== Evolution of the kanjō process ==
Kanjō was originally a Buddhist term and later entered Shinto vocabulary. A kanjō was the request of the Buddha's sermon with a sincere heart, and later came to mean the urging of a buddha or bodhisattva to remain in this world to preach and save other human beings. The concept then evolved further to mean the act (and the actual words) of asking buddhas or bodhisattvas to descend to the altar during a Buddhist service. In Japan, the word gradually assumed the present meaning of enshrinement of a buddha or kami in a building for the first time.

== The kanjō process ==
Before it can be transferred to its new location the kami must be divided. The division sub-process and the divided spirit itself are called bunrei (分霊), go-bunrei (御分霊) or wakemitama (分霊).

The process of propagation, described by Shinto priests as akin to the lighting of a candle from another already lit, leaves the original kami intact in its original place and therefore does not alter any of its properties. The resultant wakemitama has all the qualities of the original and is therefore both living and permanent. The process is used often, for example during Matsuri (Shinto festivals) to animate temporary shrines called mikisho (神酒所) and their portable versions, called mikoshi.

=== Inari kanjō ===
Inari is the kami that has been subjected to kanjō more often than any other, and is therefore a good illustration of the process.

The transfer does not necessarily take place from a shrine to another: the new location can be a privately owned object or a kamidana ("god-shelf", or altar) within an individual house. There is a recorded case of Inari being re-enshrined in a fox hole. In fact, the first recorded Inari kanjō, in 842, involved the kami's transfer to Ono no Takamura's scepter. The kami was then transported to Mutsu no Kuni (Aomori) by its owner. Some years later, he returned to Kyoto, and Aomori's people asked him to leave the kami behind, which he did in what would become Takekoma Inari.

In 1194, Emperor Go-Toba decided that only Fushimi Inari Shrine could perform any of the parts of the Inari kanjō, however abuses were so rampant that the shrine started providing an authenticity certificate with each divided spirit. The process was briefly outlawed nationwide during the Meiji Era, but was reinstated by popular demand. Nowadays, most large Inari shrines will perform it for a fee, sometimes set by the shrine or left to the discretion of the worshiper. As of 1990, Fushimi Inari Shrine had performed it eighty thousand times for private citizens. The faithful are often given the option to give a personal name to their personal kami. At Toyokawa Inari, the worshiper can buy a statue and then participate in the ceremony, called kaigen, to animate it.

When one of Inari's forms is re-enshrined with a different name, it may also be worshiped for a specific function. All the new functions are thereafter assumed to be specialties of the kami, particularly in case of a great success in the re-enshrinement, even when those functions are very far from its original nature, as for instance fishing in Inari's case.

== See also ==
- Glossary of Shinto
