= Inari Shingyō =

The Inari Shingyō (稲荷心経; lit. "Inari Heart Sutra") is an apocryphal sutra compiled in Japan and recited as a form of worship to the kami Inari.

Before the Meiji period, Buddhism and Shinto in Japan were not mutually exclusive religions, which allowed the recitation of this text to become an established practice at shrines such as Fushimi Inari-taisha.

== Origin ==
It is believed that the Inari Shingyō was first compiled at Aizen-ji, a branch temple of the Shingon Tō-ji and jingū-ji of Fushimi Inari-taisha, by the head priest Tenna (天阿). In his votive text Inari Ichiryū Daĳi (稲荷一流大事), Tenna included mantras, prayers, and norito that would result in the formation of the Inari Shingyō.

As may be expected, there is no Sanskrit original of this text, nor does a copy exist in any extant Chinese-language Buddhist canons. The Inari Shingyō is a Japanese original text grounded in the Inari faith and Shinbutsu-shūgō traditions based at Aizen-ji.

== Text ==
Japanese	Rōmaji	English
本体眞如住空理 寂静安楽無為者	HON TAI SHIN NYO JŪ KŪ RI; JAKU JŌ AN RAKU MU I SHA	The Essence is suchness and resides in the principle of emptiness. It is tranquil, blissful, and unconditioned.
鏡智慈悲利生故 運動去来名荒神	KYŌ CHI JI HI RI SHŌ KO; UN DŌ KO RAI MYŌ KŌ JIN	That which moves, coming and going, due to [the Essence's] mirror cognition and compassion that benefits sentient beings is called an aragami.
今此三界皆是我有 其中衆生悉是吾子	KON SHI SAN GAI KAI ZE GA U GO CHŪ SHU JŌ SHITSU ZE GO SHI	Now these three realms are all mine and their sentient beings are all my children.
是法住法位世間相常住	ZE HŌ JŪ HŌ I SE KEN SŌ JŌ JŪ	The Dharma abides in its Dharma position, and the world's characteristics are eternal.
貪瞋癡之三毒煩悩 皆得解脱即得解脱	TON JIN CHI SHI SAN DOKU BON NŌ; KAI TOKU GE DATSU SOKU TOKU GE DATSU	[If one realizes this] One will be freed from the three afflictive poisons of greed, aversion, and delusion, immediately achieving liberation.
掲諦掲諦波羅掲諦 波羅僧掲帝菩提薩婆訶	GYA TEI GYA TEI HA RA GYA TEI; HA RA SŌ GYA TEI BO JI SO WA KA	Gate gate pāragate pārasaṃgate bodhi svāhā ("gone, gone, everyone gone to the other shore, awakening, svāhā")
多呪即説呪曰	TA SHU SOKU SETSU SHU WATSU	There is also the following dhāraṇī:
(稲荷眞言) をんきりかくそわか をんきりかくそわか をんきりかくそわか	(Inari Shingon); ON KIRIKAKU SOWAKA; ON KIRIKAKU SOWAKA; ON KIRIKAKU SOWAKA	(Inari mantra); Oṃ hrīḥ svāhā Oṃ hrīḥ svāhā Oṃ hrīḥ svāhā

== See also ==
- Norito
- Heart Sutra
- Shugendō
