= Ōnusa =

Wooden wand used in Shinto purification rituals

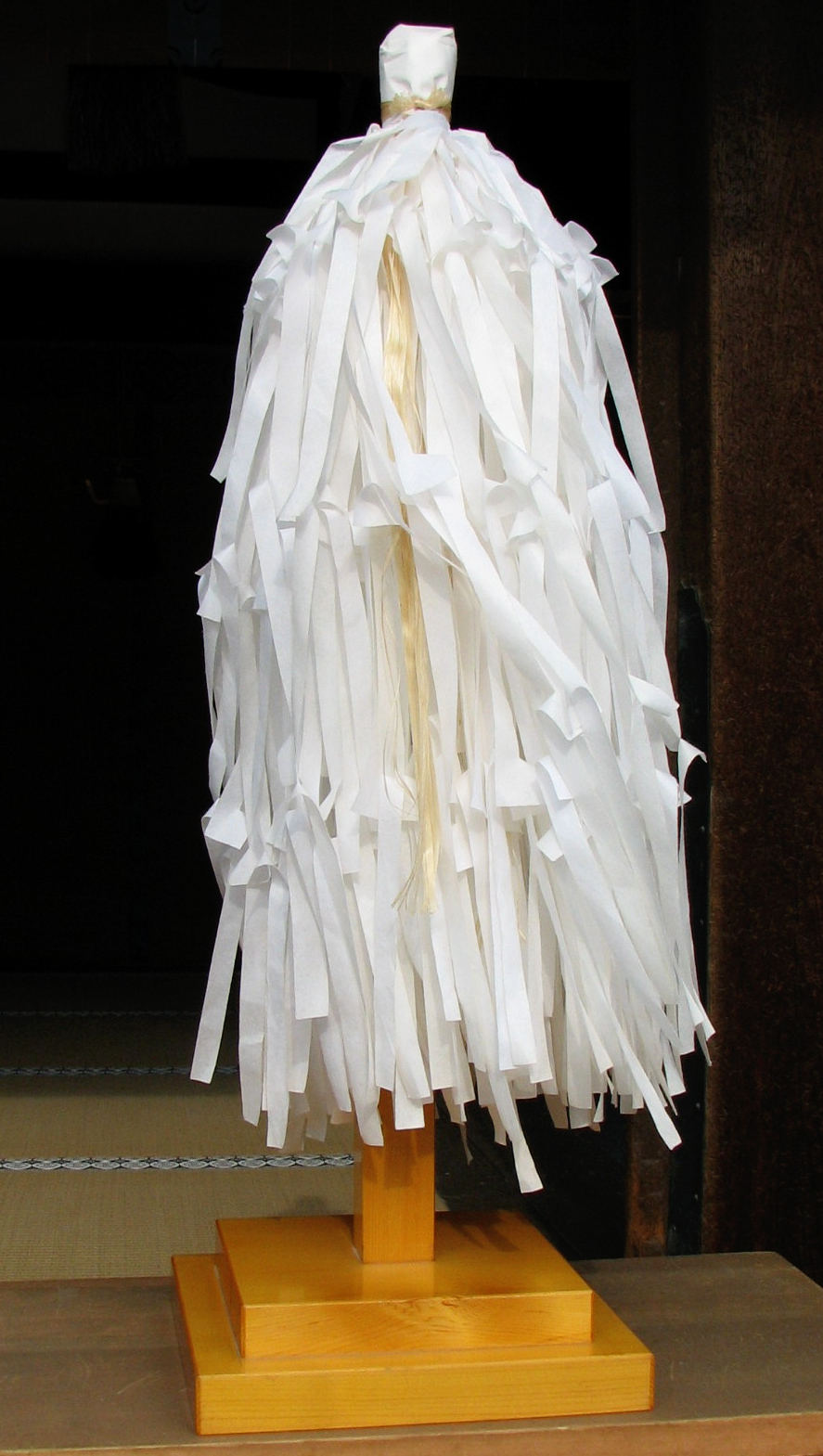
An ōnusa

An ōnusa (大幣) or simply nusa (幣) or taima (大幣) is a wooden wand traditionally used in Shinto purification rituals.

Ōnusa are decorated with a number of shide (paper streamers). When the shide are attached to a hexagonal or octagonal staff, the wand is also known as a haraegushi (祓串).

The Jingū Taima (神宮大麻) is a type of ōnusa. although they are often used in different ways than normal Onusa, usually kept in envelopes.

The most common type of Nusa today consists of a sakaki branch or a white wooden stick with a shide or Nusa ramie attached to the end. In Board of Ceremonies' "Jinja Matsuri Shiki" (1875), a branch of sakaki is used for the Nusa, and in Yatsuka Seinan's "Jinja Yushoku Kijitsu" (1951), Nusa is described as a sakaki branch with only ramie or, in addition, shidare attached, while konusa is made of wooden sticks, thin wood or bamboo. At Ise Jingu Shrine, mikisakaki, a sakaki branch with its leaves and branches still attached, is also used with Nusa attached to it, and a sakaki branch is attached to a cord of hemp as a yu (cotton). In some cases, such as at Kamogoso Shrine (Shimogamo Shrine), a branch of a peach tree is used, following the myth in the Kojiki.

Nusa is also used in different ways. In the present day, it is shaken noisily as if to purify dust, but in ancient ceremonies such as at Kasuga Taisha, it is stroked. The same is true at Ise Shrine, where noisy purification is forbidden. Today, Nusa is used by waving it left, right, and left toward the person or object to be purified, which is believed to transfer impurities to the Nusa. In the past, it was left, right, and center.

A Gohei is an ōnusa with only two Shide.

== Gallery ==
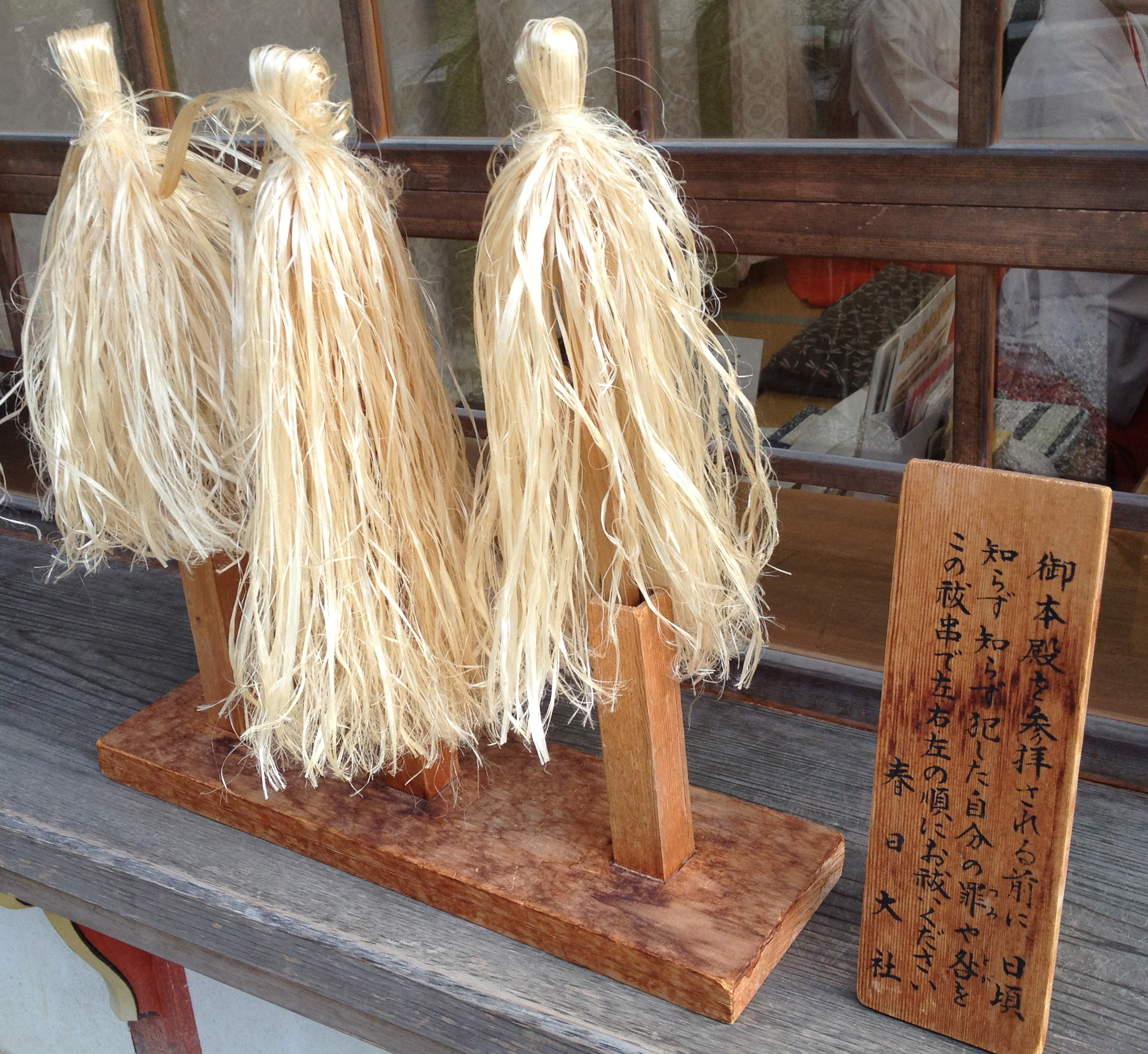
Onusa. Only ramie is attached. Worshippers purify themselves at the entrance to the main shrine of Kasuga Taisha.

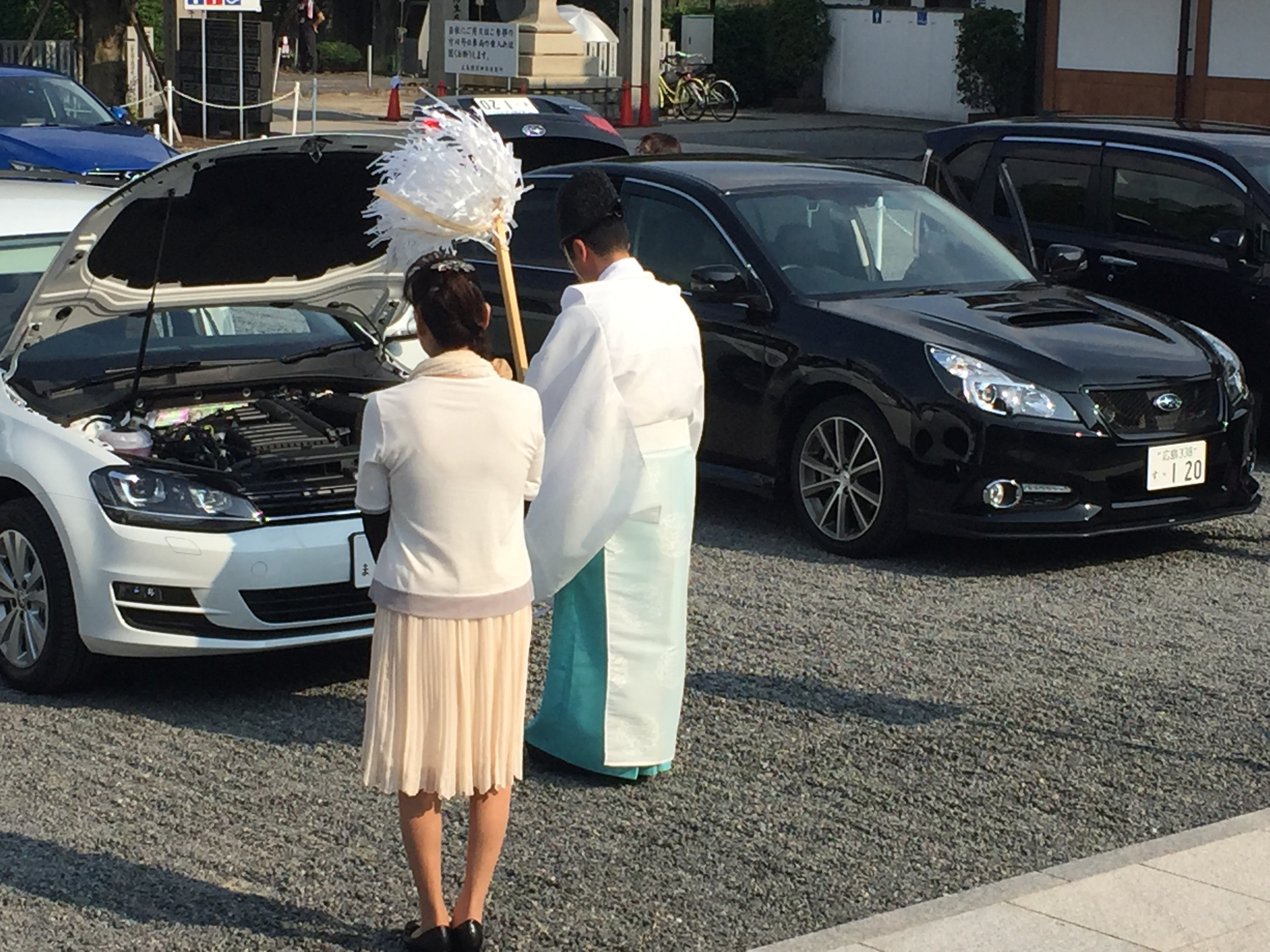
A Kannushi waves Onusa at a car

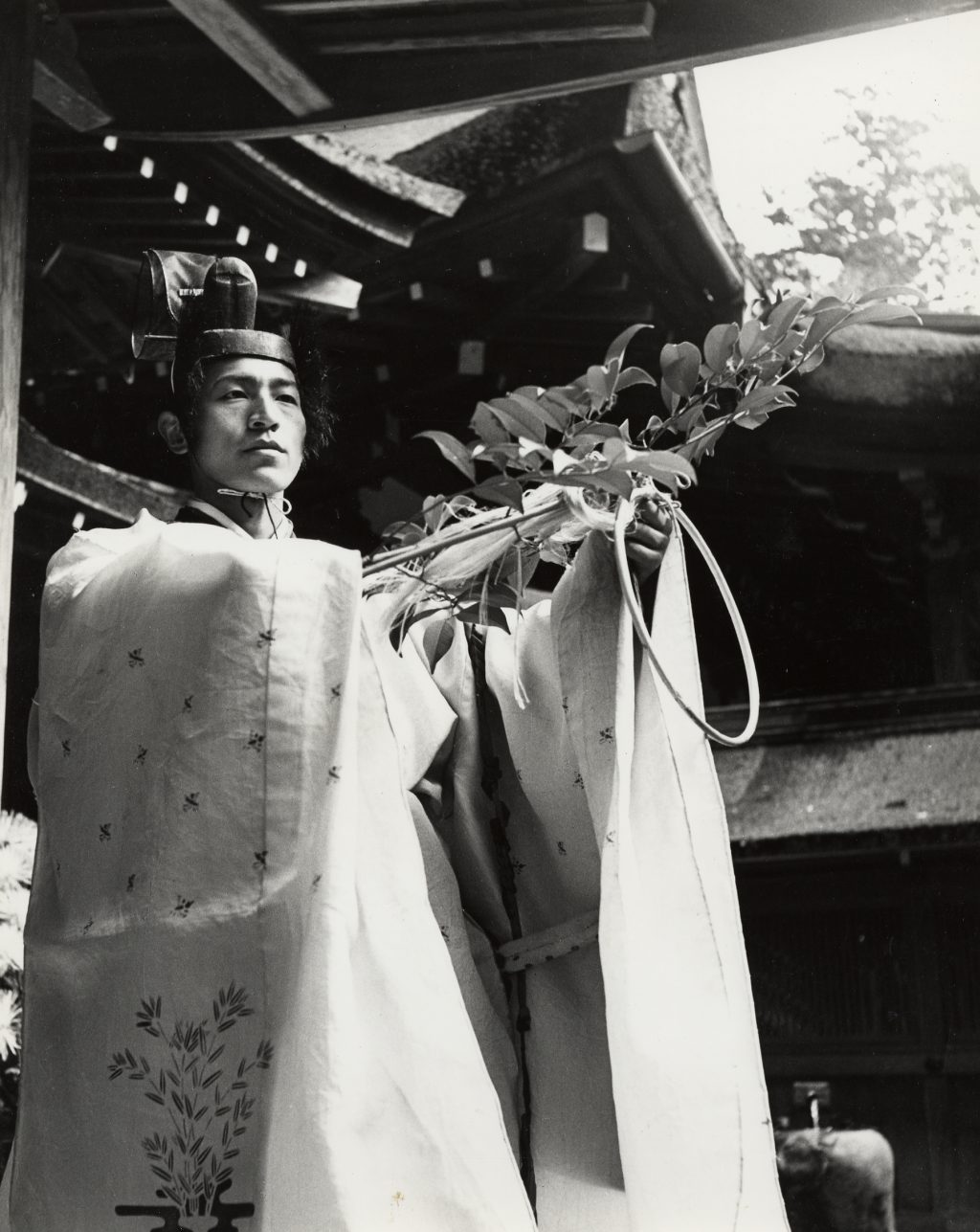
Kannushi holding onusa seemingly made from sakaki branches

== See also ==
- Hossu
- Aspergillum
- Flail
  - Crook and flail
- Glossary of Shinto
- Gohei
- Gunbai
- Harae
- Inau – Ainu version of the ōnusa
- Jingu Taima
- Hu
- Ruyi (scepter)
- Saihai
- Tamagushi

== Bibliography ==
- Kokugakuin University Institute of Japanese Culture (1999), Shinto Encyclopedia, Kobundo, ISBN 978-4335160332
- Motohiko Anzu (2000), Shinto Dictionary, Shinposha Shrine, ISBN 978-4915265617
