= Saihai =

Samurai baton

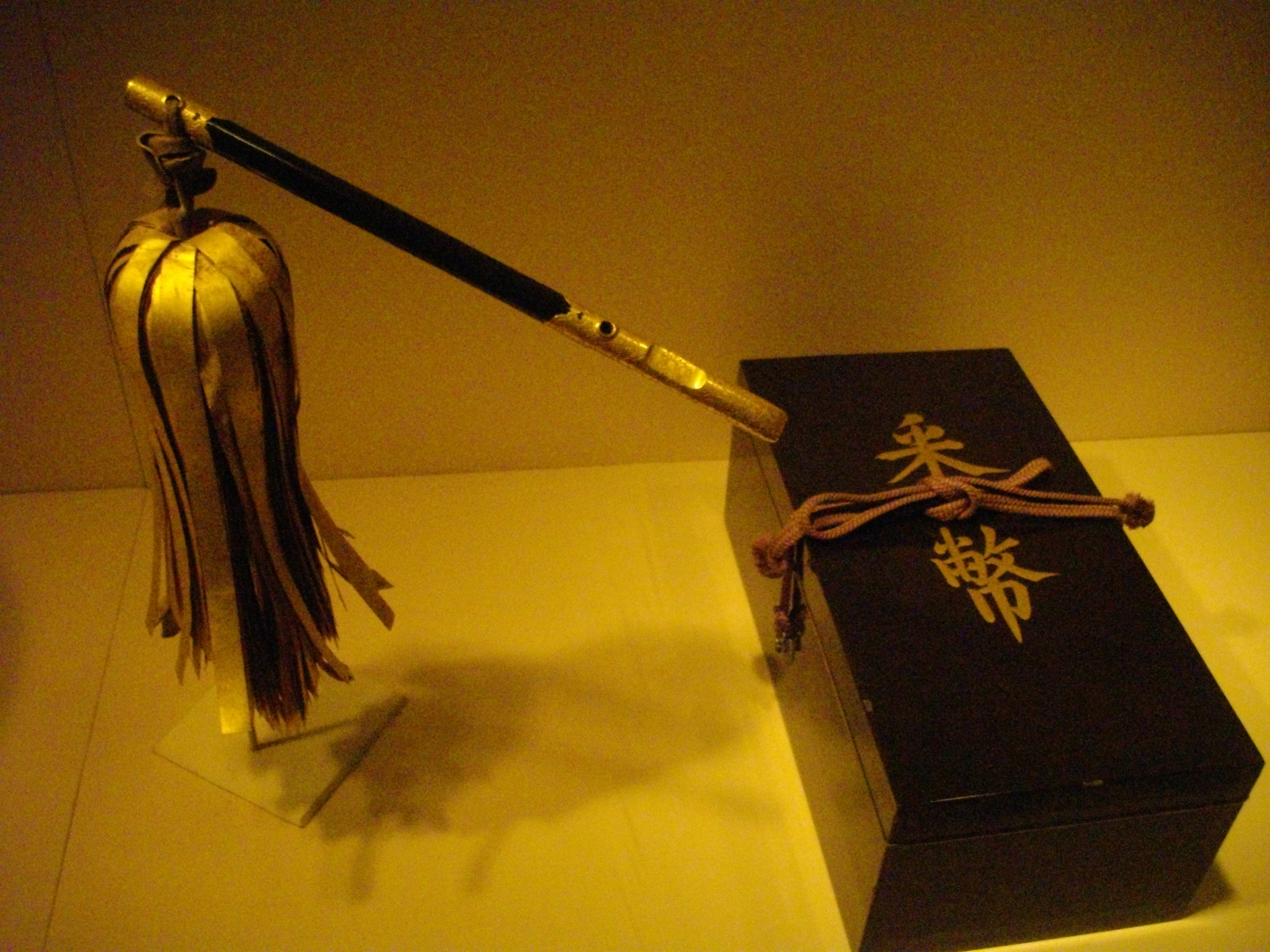
Antique saihai, Met Museum

A saihai (采配) was a baton carried by samurai commanders in feudal Japan, now used by Kannushi in formal settings. The saihai or sai-hai was a sign of rank and a signal device.

== Appearance and use ==
A saihai usually consisted of a lacquered wood stick with metal ends. The butt had a hole for a cord for the saihai to be hung from the armor of the samurai when not being used. The head of the saihai had a hole with a cord attached to a tassel of strips of lacquered paper, leather, cloth or yak hair. The saihai first came into use during the 1570s and the 1590s between the Genki and Tensho year periods. Large troop movements and improved and varied tactics required commanders in the rear to be able to signal their troops during a battle.

== Gallery ==
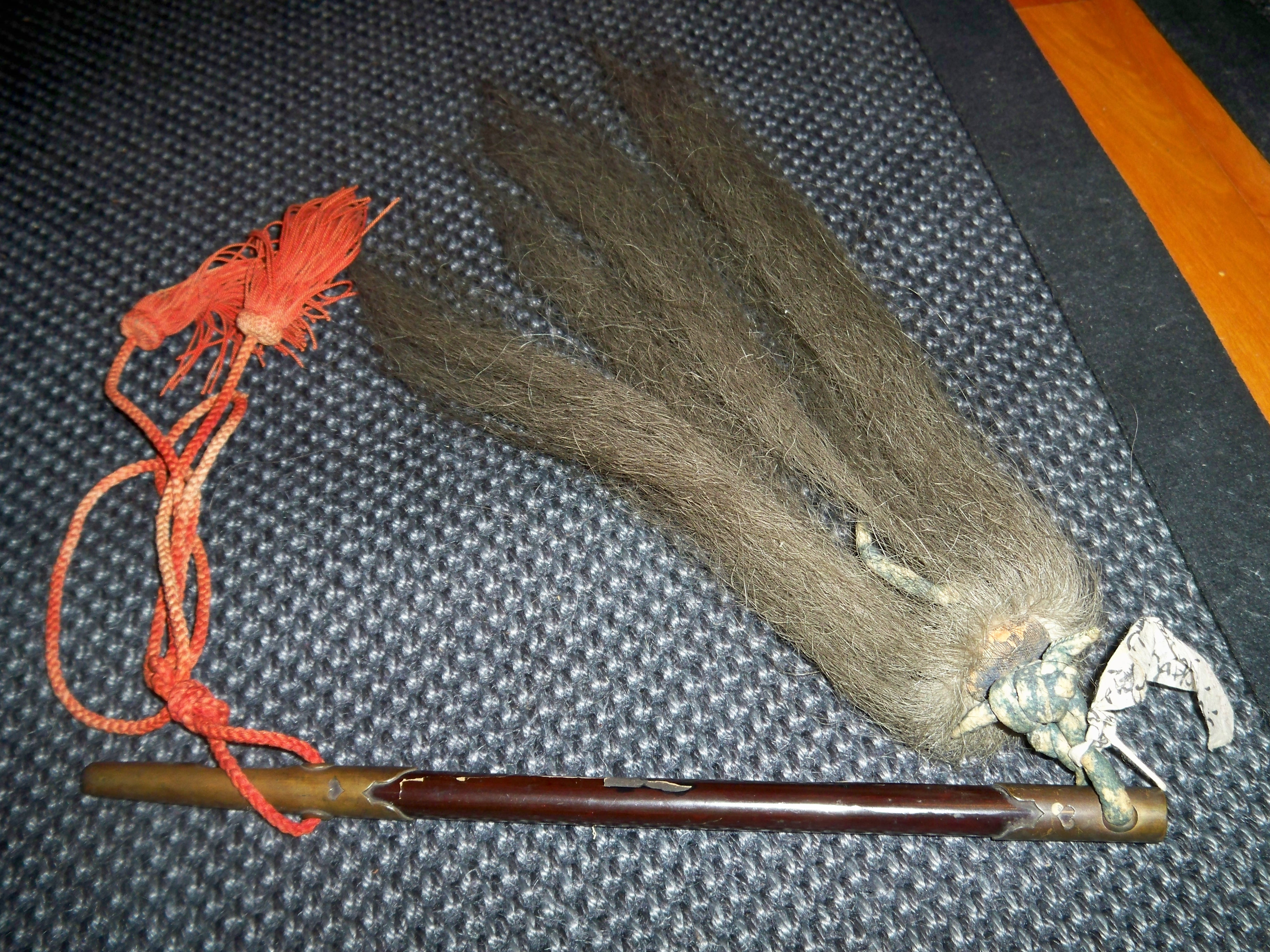
Edo period commanders baton "saihai" with a yak hair tassel

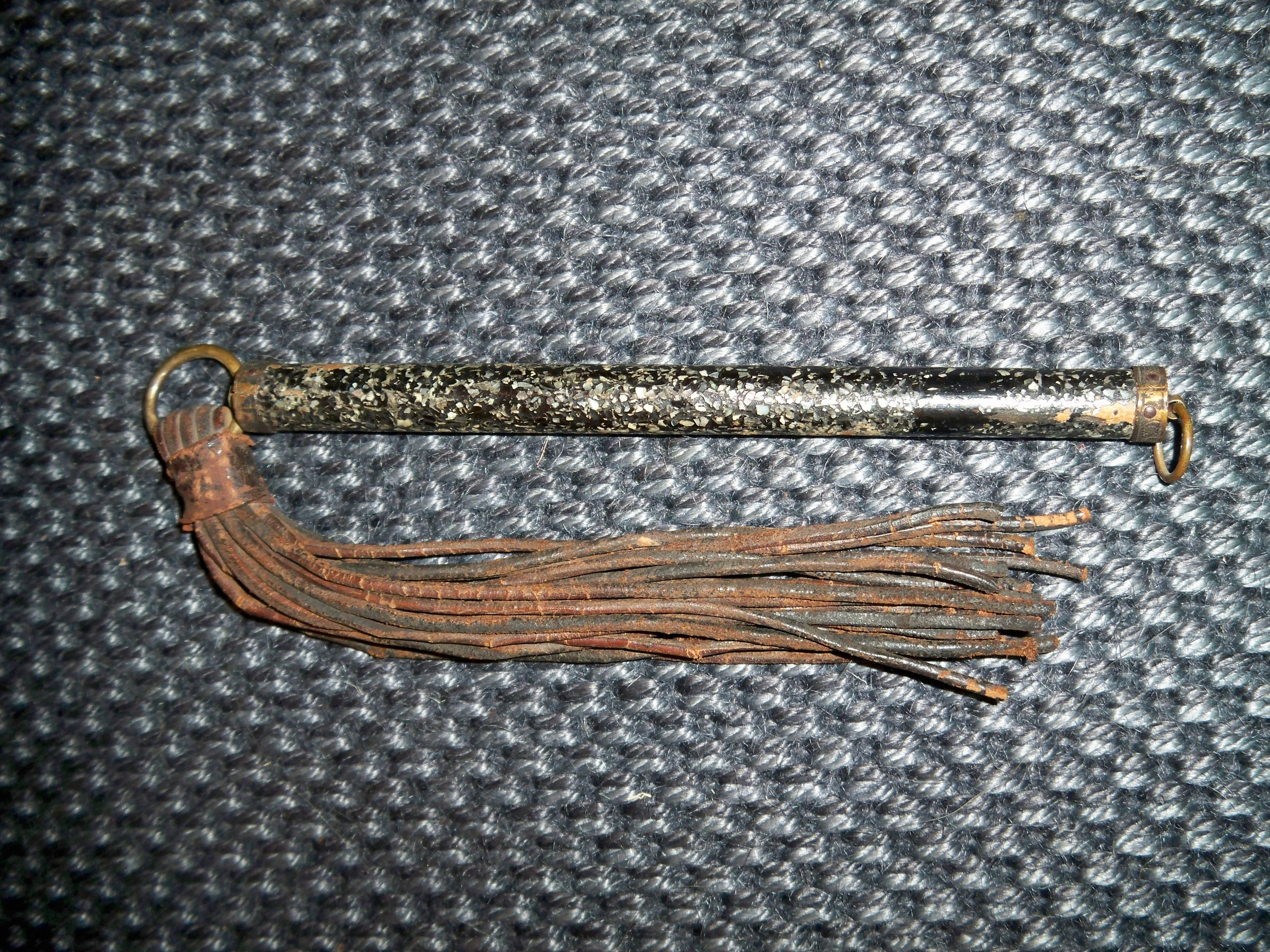
Japanese (samurai) commanders signal baton "saihai" with leather tassels

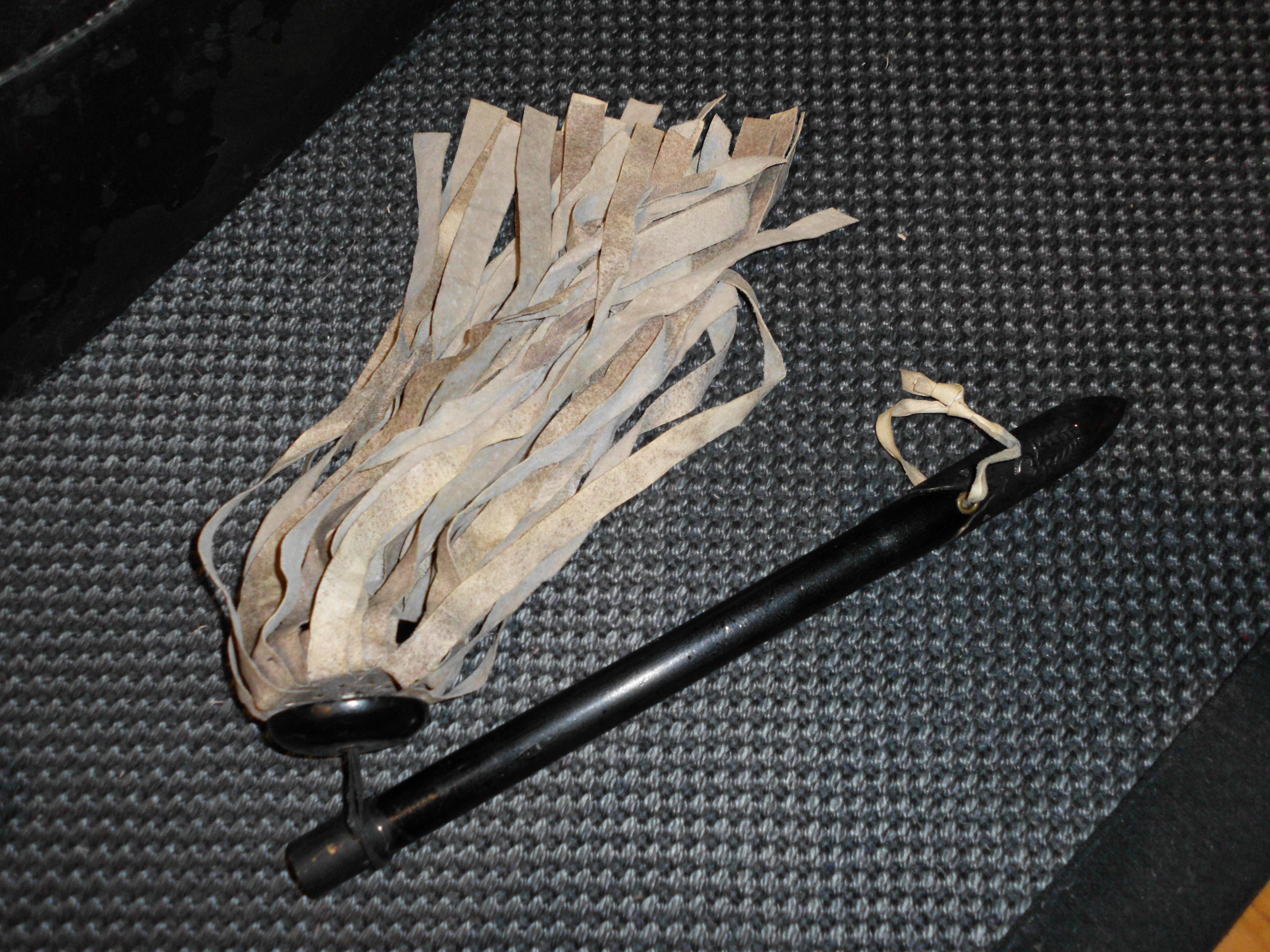
Japanese (samurai) commanders signal baton "saihai" with leather tassels

== See also ==
- Hossu
- Chigiriki
- Flail
- Gohei
- Gunbai
- Hu (ritual baton)
- Inau, wooden wands used in Ainu rituals
- Ōnusa
- Ruyi (scepter)
- Shaku
- The Glossary of Shinto for an explanation of terms concerning Japanese Shinto, Shinto art, and Shinto shrine architecture.
