= Kamidana =

Shinto altar

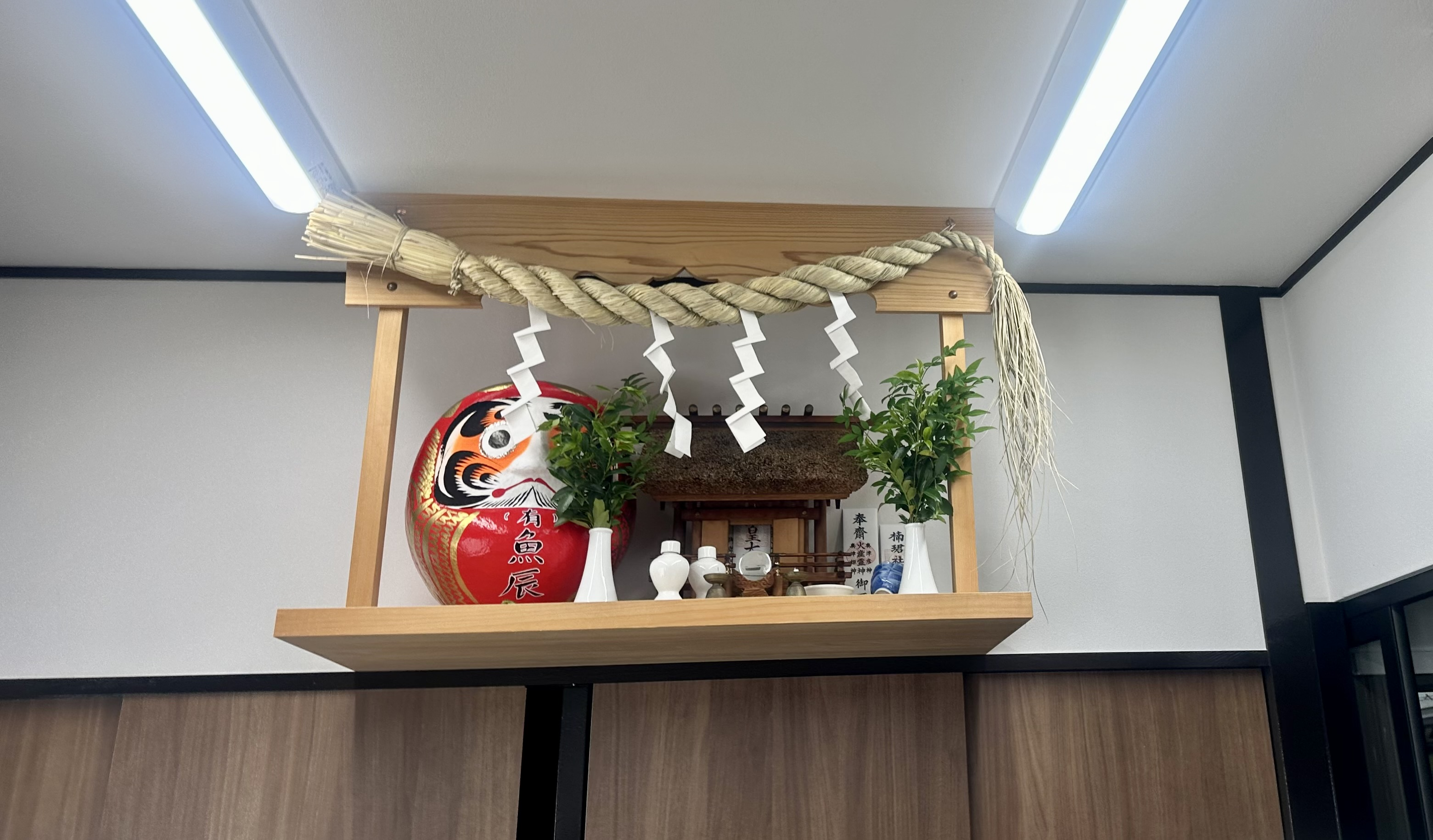
A kamidana displaying a shimenawa and shide

Kamidana (神棚, lit. 'god/spirit-shelf') are miniature household altars provided to enshrine a Shinto kami. They are most commonly found in Japan, the home of kami worship.

The kamidana is typically placed high on a wall and contains a wide variety of items related to Shinto-style ceremonies, the most prominent of which is the shintai, an object meant to house a chosen kami, thus giving it a physical form to allow worship. Kamidana shintai (Note: Shinto shrines also enshrine a shintai, which can however be of a kind not normally used for kamidana, for example a sword, a statue or a spur.) are most commonly small circular mirrors, though they can also be magatama jewels, or some other object with largely symbolic value. The kami within the shintai is often the deity of the local shrine or one particular to the house owner's profession. A part of the kami (bunrei) was obtained specifically for that purpose from a shrine through a process called kanjō.

Worship at the kamidana typically consists of the offering of simple prayers, food (e.g., rice, fruit, water) and flowers. Before worshipping at the kamidana, it is ritually important for family members to cleanse their hands or mouth.

Kamidana can also be found in some traditional Japanese martial arts dojos.

Historically, kamidana are believed to have been used to display paper emblems (shinsatsu) of the tutelary kami of the local community; in modern practice, they more commonly display the symbols of kami holding a high official rank (shinkai), typically represented by the amulets distributed by the Ise Grand Shrine.

== Acquisition and care ==
A household kamidana is typically set up in one's home to enshrine an ofuda, a type of charm. Both kamidana and ofuda can be obtained at any large Shinto shrine. Ofuda by themselves can be displayed on a counter or anywhere visible, provided that they are kept in their protective pouches. However, when an ofuda is enshrined in a kamidana, there are several rules which must be followed to ensure proper installation.

1. First, a kamidana cannot be set up on the ground or at eye level. It must be above an ordinary person's eye level.
2. Second, a kamidana cannot be set up over an entrance; it must be built into a space which people will not walk under.
3. Finally, when an ofuda is enshrined in a kamidana, after removing the pouch it is customary to leave an offering of water, liquor, or food in front of the kamidana, which should be renewed regularly. Water, for example, is stored in a small, droplet-shaped vessel called a mizutama.

These rules apply both to one's household and to martial arts dojos.

Ofuda are replaced before the end of each year. However, kamidana can be kept in one's house until they are no longer usable.

== Examples ==
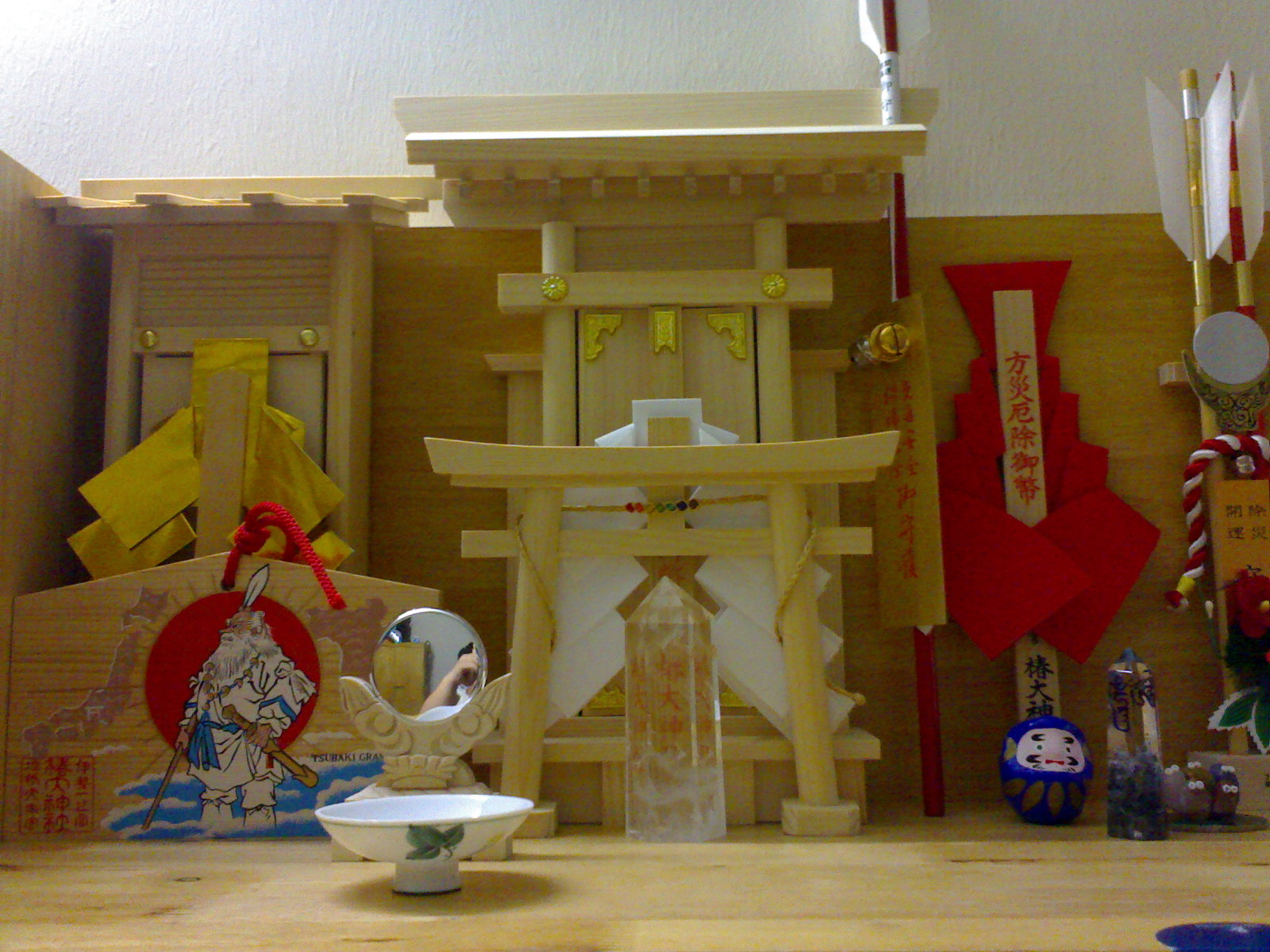
A personal kamidana

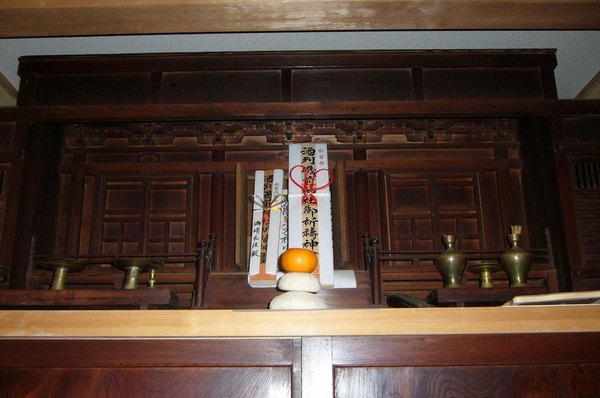
A larger household kamidana

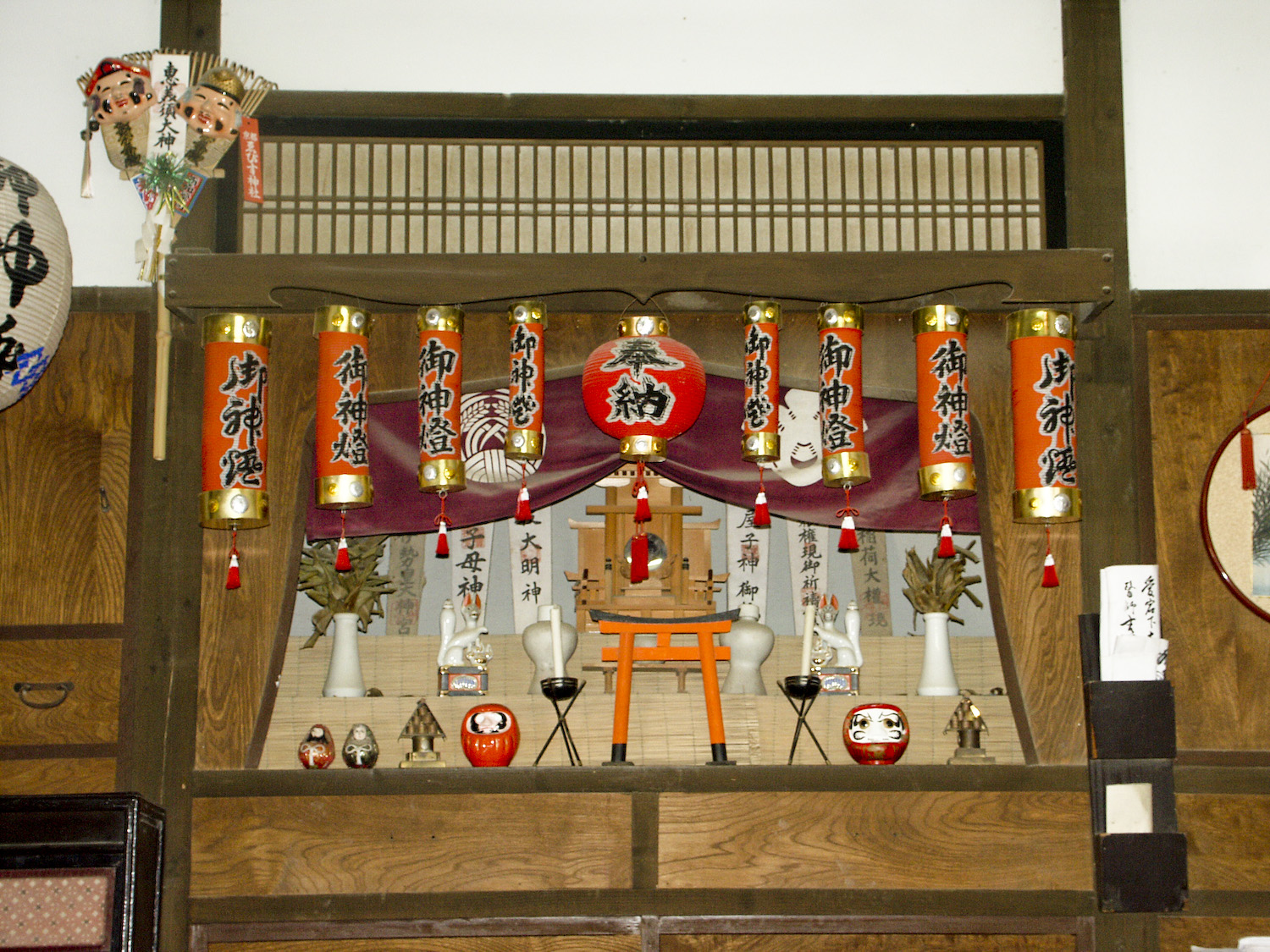
A decorative kamidana

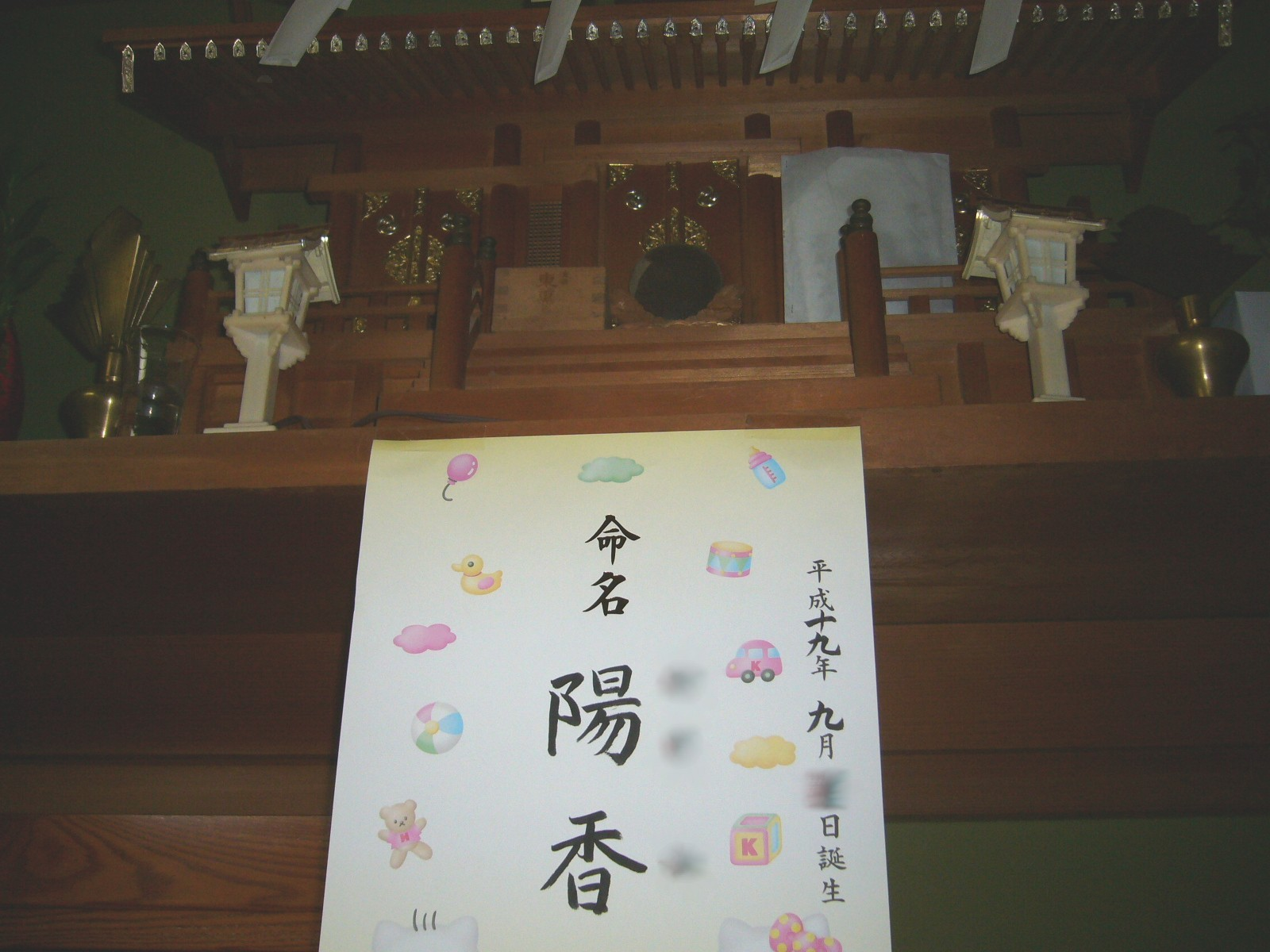
A kamidana celebrating the naming of a baby

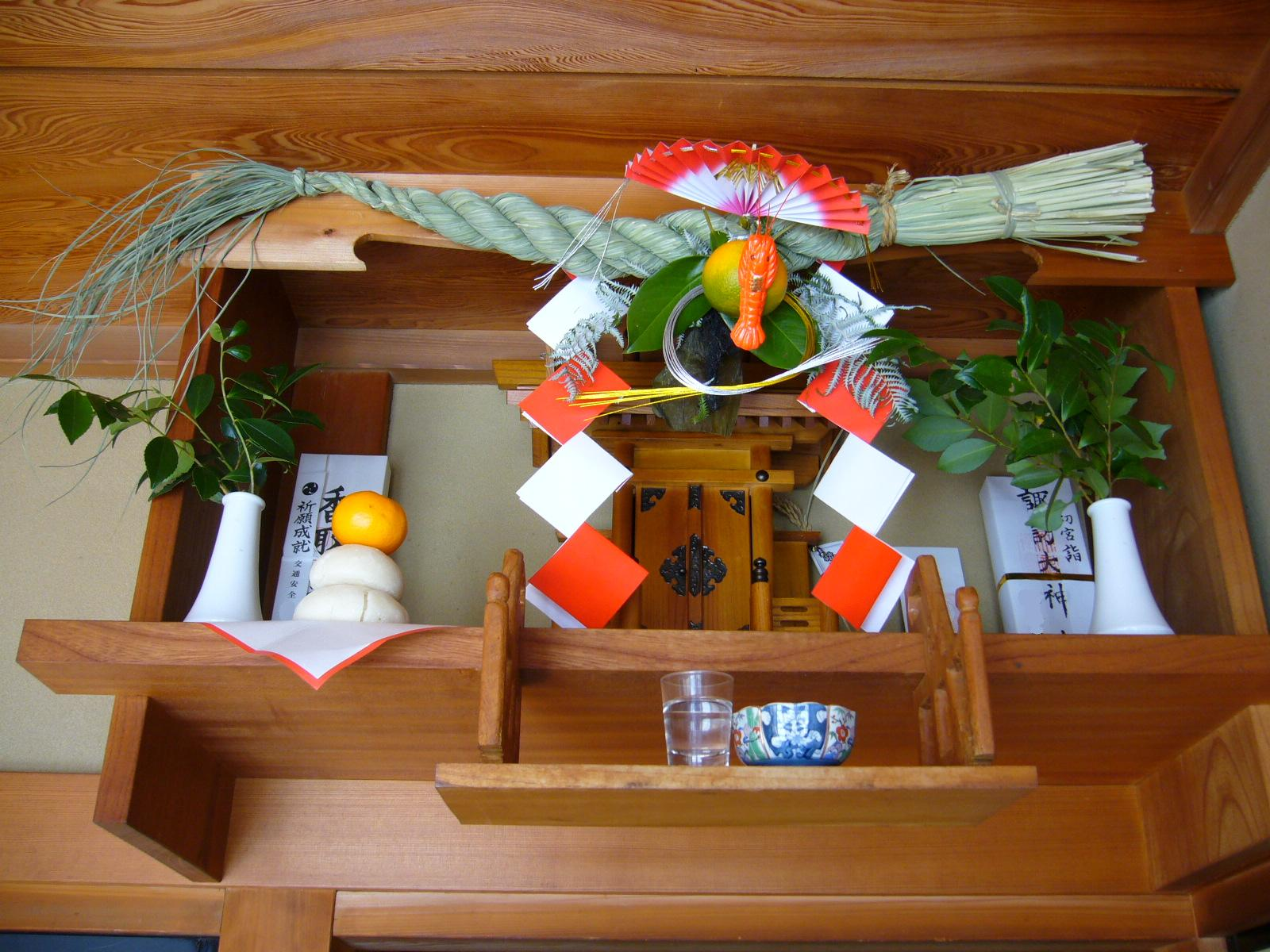
Kamidana with Jingu Taima

== See also ==
- Butsudan – analogous concept in Japanese Buddhism
- Etiquette in Japan
- Kamiza
- Ofuda
- Spirit house
- Tamaya (霊屋, lit. 'tama, "soul [of the dead]" + ya, "house"') - also called otamaya, mitamaya, or soreisha
- Tokonoma

== Bibliography ==
- Ono, Sokyo, Shinto: The Kami Way, Charles E. Tuttle Company, ISBN 4-8053-0189-9
