= Shide (Shinto) =

Paper streamer used in Shinto rituals

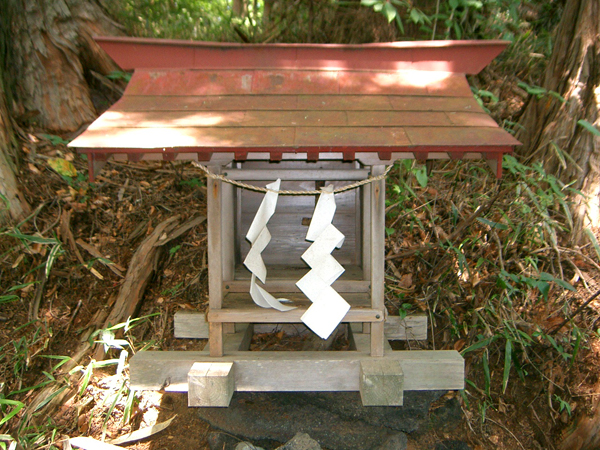
A Shinto shrine with shide made out of unprocessed hemp fibre.

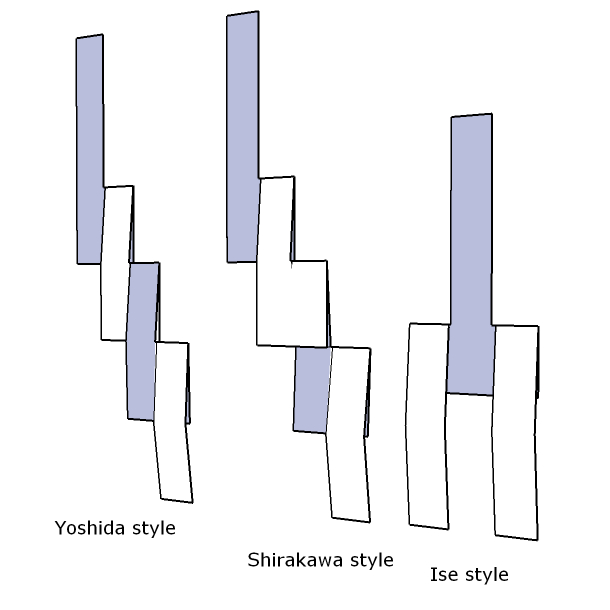
Types of shide

Shide (紙垂, 四手) are zigzag-shaped paper streamers, often seen attached to shimenawa or tamagushi to demarcate holy spaces, and used in Shinto rituals in Japan. They are usually found adorning doorways, shrine buildings, and kamidana.

The origins of shide are traced to the yūshide, a thread made from the bark of Broussonetia × kazinoki mentioned in the Kojiki. There are different styles of folding shide. One method requires placing the paper zigzags in a cut slit on a stick, creating a ritual object known as a gohei or heihaku. A gohei is an offering to kami that can be seen on kamidana altars and inside the main building of a Shinto shrine.

A common purification ritual uses a haraegushi, a wooden stick with linen or paper shide attached at the top. A Shinto priest waves the haraigushi over a person, item, or newly bought property, such as a building or a car. The wand is waved at a slow and rhythmic pace, but with little force so that the shide strips make a rustling noise on each pass of the wand. For new properties, a similar ritual known as jichiin sai (lit. "calming the land") is performed with a haraigushi within an enclosed part of the land (enclosed by shimenawa).
