= Ōharae no Kotoba =

Norito in Shinto rituals

Ōharae no Kotoba (大祓詞; lit. "Words of Great Purification") is a Shinto prayer used in certain Shinto rituals. It is also known as Nakatomi Saimon (中臣祭文; lit. "Nakatomi Ritual Text"), or Nakatomi no Harae Kotoba (中臣祓詞; lit. "Nakatomi Purification Words"), as it was traditionally recited by a priest of the Nakatomi clan during the Ōharae-shiki ritual. It appears in the Engishiki, Volume 8, where it is referred to as Minazuki no Tsugomori no Ōharae (六月晦大祓; lit. "Great Purification of the Last Day of the Sixth Month"). Generally, when the name Ōharae no Kotoba is used, it refers to the form of recitation that addresses the participants of the ceremony; when referred to as the Nakatomi no Harae Kotoba, the form addressing the kami is used.

== Overview ==
While there is no agreed upon origin for the introduction of the Ōharae no Kotoba into regular use, two leading theories posit that it first saw use in Shinto rituals during either the reigns of Emperors Tenji or Tenmu (c. 661–686), or during the reign of Emperor Monmu (c. 697–707). However, scholars generally agree that the written versions of the prayer existed prior to its adoption as a spoken prayer.

Ōharae no Kotoba was originally a prayer recited at the purification rituals held at the end of the sixth and twelfth months of the Chinese calendar, to purify the tsumi and kegare accumulated over the year. It was also called the Nakatomi no Harae Kotoba because the Nakatomi clan recited it at the Suzakumon in the imperial capital. The words differed between the sixth and twelfth months, with only the words for the sixth-month version remaining today. They are recorded in the Engishiki as the Minazuki no Tsugomori no Ōharae, which became the base of the version of the Ōharae no Kotoba used today.

While originally addressed to those participating in the ceremony, tradition underwent a period of change which saw the Ōharae no Kotoba addressed directly to the kami. In the Middle Ages, the prayer became associated with Onmyōdo and esoteric Buddhism. In this era, it was believed one could gain merit by reciting the prayer, similarly to how one might when reciting Onmyōdo incantations or Buddhist sutras. It was also believed that one gained even more merit the more they recited it. As a result of this belief, abbreviated versions of the prayer were created which condensed its most important points and were intended for use by individuals repeating the prayer for thousands of iterations. It was particularly important in Buddhist and Confucian Shinto, which led to annotated books of the prayer such as Nakatomi no Harae Kunge (中臣祓訓解; An Explanation of the Nakatomi Purification) and Nakatomi no Harae Fūsuisō (中臣祓風水草; Nakatomi Purification Wind, Water, and Grass).

Today, the Ōharae no Kotoba is recited by the worshippers themselves at the ceremony, as well as being recited every day before the kami at shrines belonging to the Association of Shinto Shrines. Outside of the Association, the prayer is also used by all denominations of Sect Shinto as well as some Shinto-based new religions, though it has been altered from the version recorded in the Engishiki, and there are slight differences between the versions used in the different sects.

== History ==
There are several theories about the formation of the exorcism text. Some say that its author was Ame-no-Tane, the grandson of Ame-no-Koyane, while others say that it was Nakatomi Tokiwa. It is also claimed that Nakatomi Kane presented the purification text to Tenji and used it for the Great Purification rituals that took place every six months.

The prayer was performed twice annually at the Suzakumon Gate in Kyoto, in December and June, with the intent to purify the world of the unintentional 'sins' committed by humanity. The eighth volume of the Engishiki recorded this right as the "June - New Year's Even Exorcism".

Since the text was first created in the c. 600s, it has held significance for both Shinto and Buddhist believers in Japan and resulted in the creation of many commentary texts written about the use and effect of the Ōharae no Kotoba recorded over time.

In the 12th century, a new version of the prayer was introduced which altered the wording slightly. Where the original Ōharae no Kotoba was intended for public recitation in order to cleanse humanity of its accidental impurities, the new Nakatomi-no-harae (or "Nakatomi Exorcism") would be recited in private settings in order to cleans individuals or families. The name "Nakatomi Exorcism" comes from the fact that it was first read by the Nakatomi clan.

The Nakatomi exorcism was used by the Department of Divinities to purify the emperor, and Onmyōjis used it for private prayers in the early 12th century, with the concluding phrase of the Nakatomi Exorcism, "The eight million gods will not pretend to hear." The current version of the exorcism text, distributed by the Jinja Main Office, which is the oldest form of the exorcism text, refers to the exorcism deities as "Amatsukami, Kunitsukami, and the eight million deities."

The newer, individually focused Nakatomi-no-harae spread to other regions and was adopted into practice by Buddhist monks. Buddhist practitioners referred to the prayer as the "Chushinguraibun" ("Chushingin Exorcism"), which was established as an official practice in the late Heian period. As the ritual saw wider spread adoption during this period, the uses for the prayer evolved from strictly purification to also being used in a congratulatory capacity during regular prayers.

Suzuki Shigetane's "Lectures on Celebration Words", vol. 10, explains the name of the exorcism as follows:

It is also old-fashioned to refer to exorcisms as "Nakatomi exorcisms. However, since exorcism refers to an event, the correct term should be "Nakatomi exorcism. In the Kokugo Shiki, there is a verse that says, "I will have Amatsu-no-Mikoto and Kunitsu-no-Mikoto release you from your sins. It is correct to say that amatsutsumi refers to the sins committed by the people of the country, and kokutsutsumi refers to the sins committed by the people of the country.

In Ise Shinto, a unique method of exorcism was established by the beginning of the Kamakura period (1185–1333), but became a secret in the late Kamakura period. In the Yoshida Shinto, the Nakatomi exorcism was also emphasised, and unique rituals and notes were performed.

In the Middle Ages, along with the study of the Nihon Shoki Shinto scrolls, the study of Nakatomi no Harae progressed, and the belief in it deepened. The Ise Shinto and its five Shinto books, Ryobe Shinto and Sanno Shinto were influential to the performance of the exorcism. The theory of Nakatomi's exorcism was cited in the analogous Shinto sources of the Doge's book, and though known as the work of Kūkai, it was made public in the late Kamakura period. The Nakatomi Exoteric Text in the Jingu Bunko collection is a transcription of an ancient manuscript from the early Kamakura period, dated June Kenpo 3 (1215). The same period was also used for the study of the same commentary on the exorcism by Fujiwara no Asomi Mikodayu. During the Muromachi period and Sengoku period, the Yoshida family of Kaguraoka, Kyoto, devoted the most attention to the study of Nakatomi's exorcisms, most notably by Yoshida Kanetomo. Kanetomo wrote the book "Nakatomi exorcism", and his son Kiyohara Nobuken wrote "Nakatomi exorcism". Kanetomo's descendants, Yoshida Kanenaga and Yoshida Kaneru, lectured on, promoted, copied, and disseminated both books.

From the end of the Heian period (794–1185) to the Edo period (1603–1868), the words read daily were called "Nakatomi-haraishibushi", and the words read at the exorcism ceremony on the last day of June and December were called "Dai-haraishibushi". Expressions differed in the ending and middle of the text in the exorcism text read at the exorcism ceremony compared with the Nakatomi exorcism text read on a daily basis. In the late Edo period (1603–1868), as Kokugaku (the study of the country) and Fuko-shinto (the ancient Shinto religion) flourished, the original name "Daihaishiki" came to be used again.

== Content ==
=== Oharae no Kotoba ===
According to the Traditional Culture Research Center of Kokugakuin University, the Ōharae no Kotoba recorded in the Engishiki is composed of the following three sections:

1. Passages one and two: Announce the opening of the Ōharae-shiki to all gathered officials from the imperial princes downwards. Request their attention, as the tsumi of all the workers and servants of the imperial court will be purified on that day, in the sixth month of that year.
2. Passage three: The main body of the prayer, considered the core of the purification.
3. Passage four: 卜部Divinators of the four provinces of Izu, Iki, and Upper and Lower Tsushima are ordered to carry haraetsumono (祓えつ物; objects used in purification) to a great river into which they will cast away the objects.

=== Nakatomi no Harae ===
While the Ōharae no Kotoba used in the regularly scheduled semimanual Ōharae-shiki and any extraordinary Ōharae-shiki is in the form addressing the participants of the ceremony, the Nakatomi no Harae Kotoba is an altered version of the Ōharae no Kotoba in a form which beseeches the eight-million kami of the purification ground and used as necessary. The oldest record of the Nakatomi no Harae Kotoba is under the heading Nakatomi Saimon in the Chōyagunsai (朝野群載) of the 12^{th} century. Despite this, religion historian Takaaki Daitō theorizes the Nakatomi no Harae Kotoba was created in the 10^{th} century and used by the Department of Divinities as a private ritual on behalf of the emperor.
