= Bunrei =

Division of Shinto kami spirit

Bunrei or wakemitama (分霊) is a Shinto technical term that indicates both the process of dividing a Shinto kami to be re-enshrined somewhere else (such as a house's kamidana), and the spirit itself produced by the division. Shrines conduct bunrei to distribute them to "child" shrines elsewhere. The spirit of kami does not decrease through this act, and a bunrei functions the same way as the original spirit. The reason for conducting bunrei is often to make a kami more accessible to worshipers far from the main shrine.
