= Gunbai =

Japanese signal baton and war fan

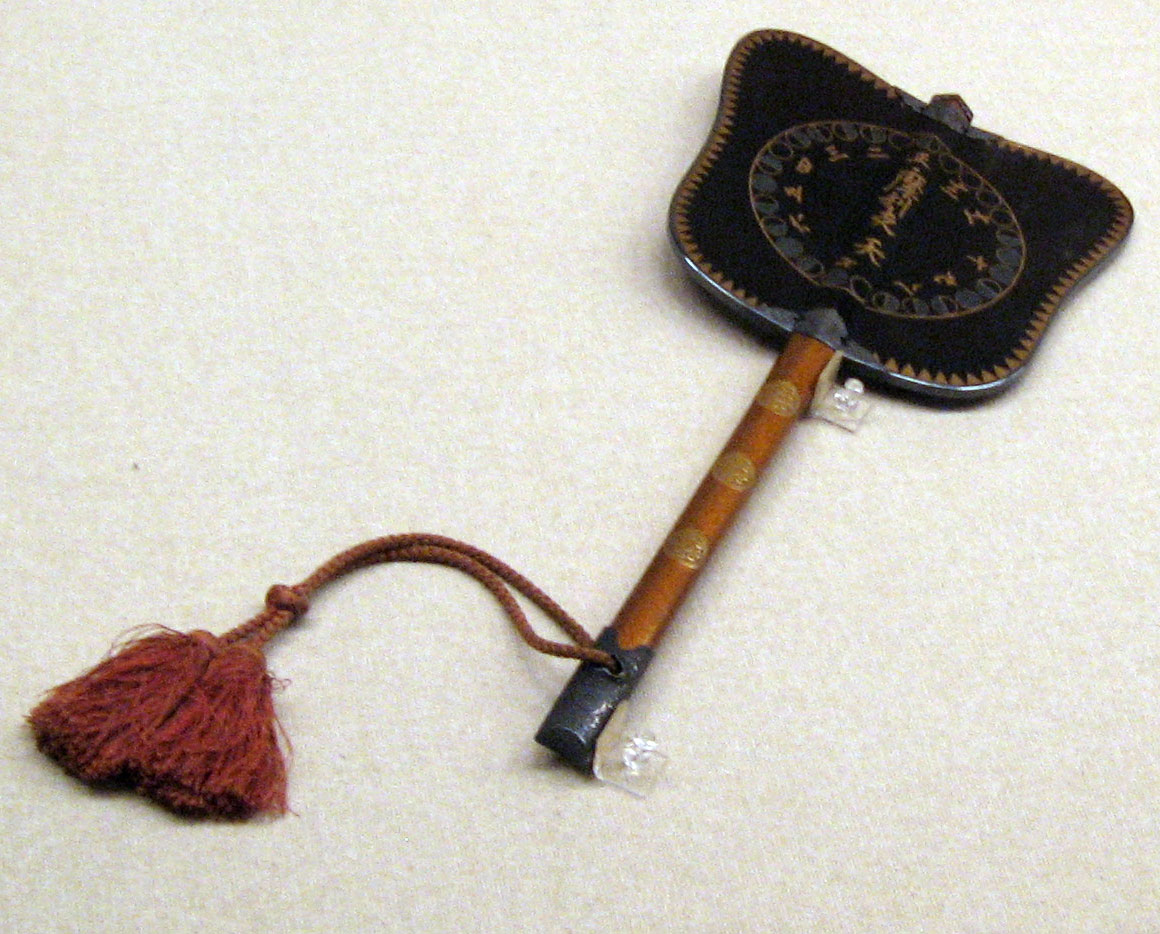
A gunbai

The gunbai (軍配; short for gunbai-uchiwa (軍配団扇)) is a type of signal baton and Japanese war fan. Once held by military leaders (such as daimyō) and priests in the past, it is used in the modern day by referees in sumo wrestling.

== Description ==
Gunbai, from the Sino-Japanese roots meaning "military-apportioned [fan]", were a specialized form of fan used by samurai officers in Japan to communicate commands to their troops. Unlike regular fans, gunbai were solid, not folding, and usually made of wood, wood covered with metal, or solid metal.

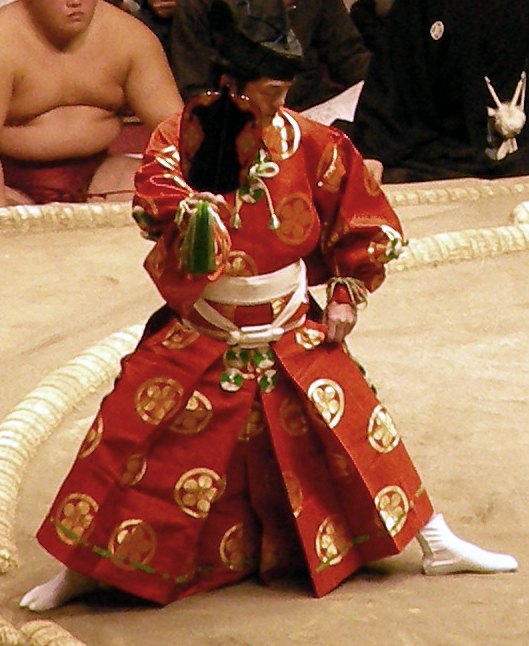
A sumo gyōji wielding a gunbai

It is also a key accessory of a gyōji (referee) in professional sumo. The main use is at the end of a bout, when the gyōji decides the victor and points the gunbai to either the east or west position (each wrestler is assigned to start from either the east or west position each tournament day). Reflecting this, the gyōji's decision itself is often informally referred to as a "gunbai". If this is called into question and the judges hold a consultation, a decision to uphold the gyōji's judgement is announced as gunbai-dōri (軍配通り; lit. "according to the gunbai"), while a decision to overturn it is gunbai-sashichigae (軍配差し違え; lit. "gunbai mispointed"). In modern times, all gyōji will take either the family name Kimura or Shikimori as their professional name, depending on the tradition of the stable that they join. There are exceptions to this naming convention, but they are rare. Additionally, there are different styles to how a gyōji will hold his gunbai depending on which family he is in. The Kimura family hold their gunbai with their palm and fingers faced up, while the Shikimori will hold theirs with their palm and fingers faced down.

== Family crest (Mon) ==
The Gunbai-Uchiwa, along with the Touchiwa (Karauchiwa), is also used as a Mon (family crest).

== See also ==
- Gohei
- Japanese war fan
- Ruyi (scepter)
- Saihai
- Samurai signal devices
- Shaku
- Ōnusa
