= Norito =

Liturgical texts or ritual incantations in Shinto

Norito (祝詞) are liturgical texts or ritual incantations in Shinto, usually addressed to a given kami.

== History ==
The first written documentation of norito dates to 712 CE in the Kojiki and 720 CE in the Nihongi.

The Engishiki, a compilation of laws and minute regulation presented by the court compiled in 927 CE, preserves twenty-seven representative forms of norito.

== Etymology ==
There is no single universally accepted theory to explain the meaning of the term. One theory derives norito from noru (宣る, 'to declare'; cf. the verbs inoru 'to pray' and norou 'to curse') - combined with the suffix -to. A variant term, notto, is derived from a combination of norito with koto, 'word'.

There are various known ways of writing the word in kanji: aside from 祝詞 (currently the standard), 詔戸言, 詔刀言, and 諄辞 are also attested.

One recent writer summed up the original meaning of norito as "a general term meaning magic by means of words."

== Form and content ==
The Shinto religion did not produce any writings, particularly those that inferred from myths and legends, that would have constituted a religious theology except for the norito. (One should, however, note that the Kojiki and the Nihongi, while written primarily as historical works rather than sacred scriptures, do contain mythical narratives of the Shinto tradition.) These few prayers were primarily used in purification rituals and articulated gratitude towards the gods for the blessings of kami or to ask for climate change such as rain.

Norito is a form of a rhythmic poem recited to facilitate the transmission of posterity. The incantation would usually begin with praises for the supreme power of kami and concludes with an expression of respect and awe. The Nakatomi no Harae Kunge or the Exposition of the Ritual of Purification describes norito within a process that implies the idea of human beings as children of the kami who lost their purity but who return to their divine origin by restoring it.

Scholars have identified a broadly codified structural pattern underlying the norito preserved in the Engishiki: the announcement of the name of the saijin (the enshrined kami), an explanation of the associated festival's mythological origin, a reference to shintoku (the virtue arising from the kami's actions), the shinsen (food offerings), and a statement of the liturgy's purpose. Norito are further classified by their closing formula, ending either with "I announce" or with "I humbly say"; unlike their Engishiki counterparts, modern norito generally omit the mythological explanation.

== Reading ==
Norito were (and still are) traditionally written in a variety of man'yōgana where particles and suffixes are written in a smaller script than the main body of the text. This style of writing, used in imperial edicts (宣命 senmyō) preserved in the Shoku Nihongi and other texts dating from the 8th century (Nara period), is known as senmyōgaki.

== See also ==
- Kotodama
