= Flail =

Flail may refer to:

- Flail (tool), an agricultural implement for threshing
- Flail (weapon), a ball-on-a-chain bludgeon wielded with one hand by armored knights in single combat or medieval battles
- Flail, the cutting part in some designs of brush hog, stump grinder, and woodchipper
- Mine flail, a vehicle mounted device for removing land mines

== See also ==
- Flail chest
