= Miko =

Shinto shrine maiden

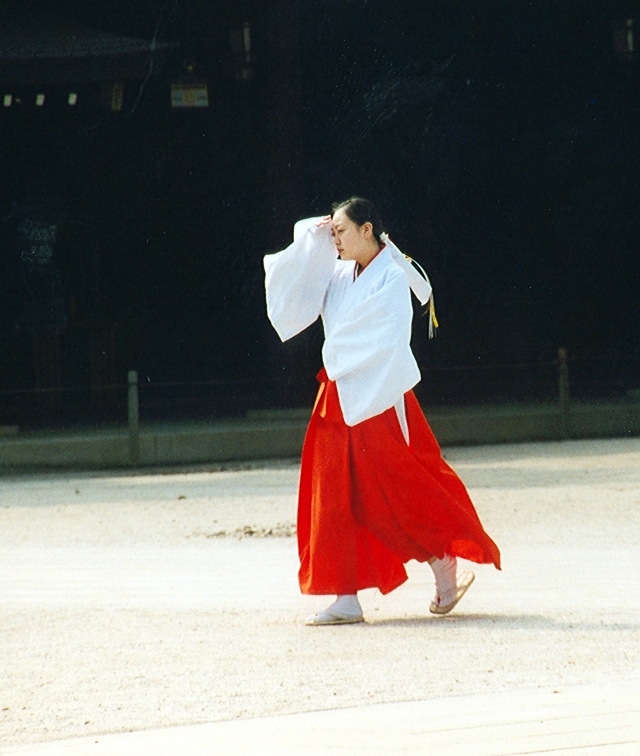
Modern miko in Meiji Shrine, Tokyo, in 2000

A miko (巫女), or shrine maiden, is a young priestess who works at a Shinto shrine. Miko were once likely seen as shamans, but are understood in modern Japanese culture to be an institutionalized role in daily life, trained to perform tasks ranging from sacred cleansing to performing the sacred Kagura dance.

== Appearance ==
The traditional attire of a miko is a pair of red hakama (緋袴) (divided, pleated trousers), a white kosode (a predecessor of the kimono), and some white or red hair ribbons. In Shinto, the color white symbolizes purity. The garment put over the kosode during Kagura dances is called a chihaya (千早).

Traditional miko tools include the Azusa Yumi (梓弓, "catalpa bow"), the tamagushi (玉串) (offertory sakaki-tree branches), and the gehōbako (外法箱, a "supernatural box that contains dolls, animal and human skulls ... [and] Shinto prayer beads").

Miko also use bells, drums, candles, gohei, and bowls of rice in ceremonies.

== Definition ==
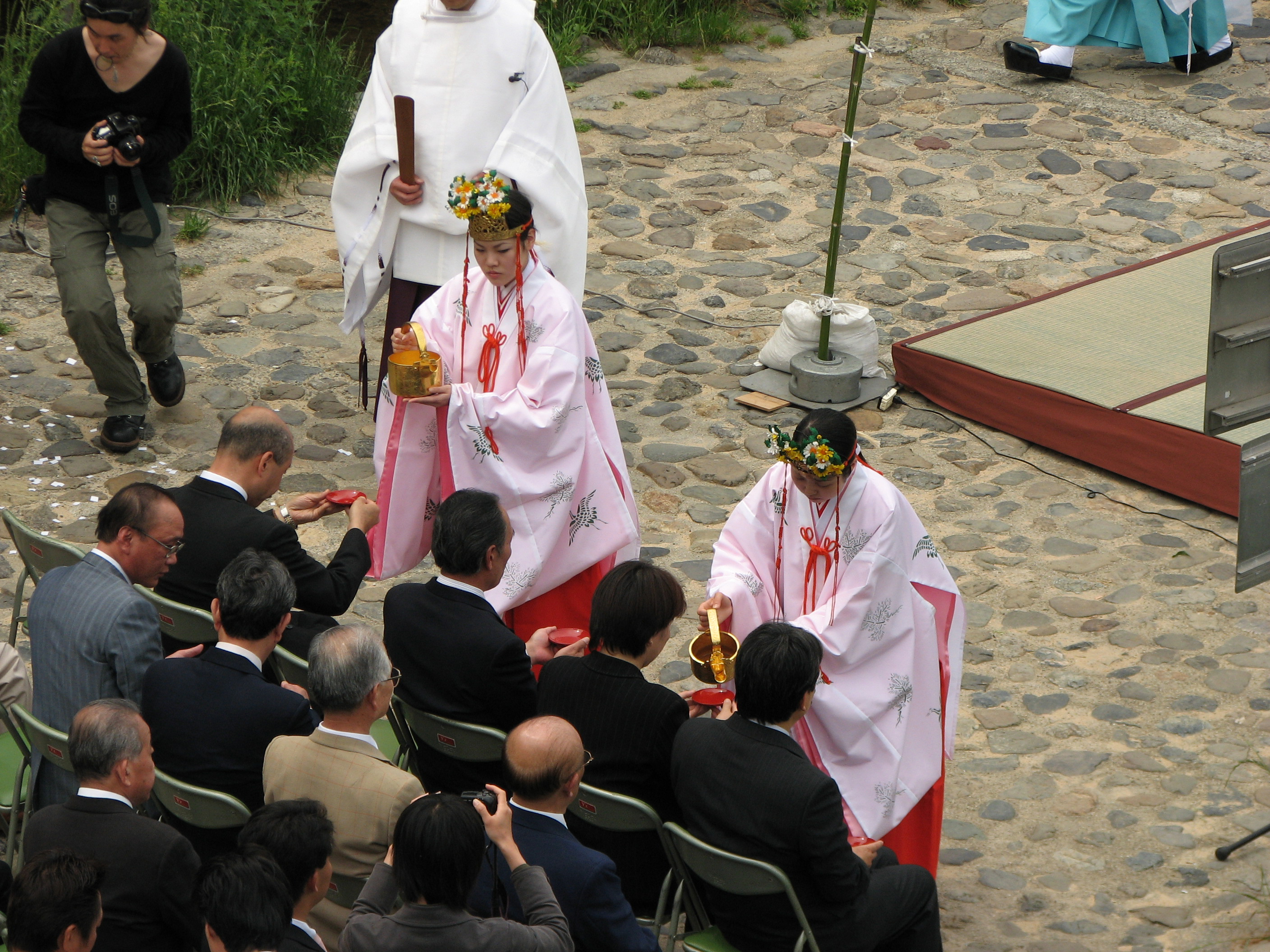
Miko perform Shinto ceremony near the Kamo River in 2006

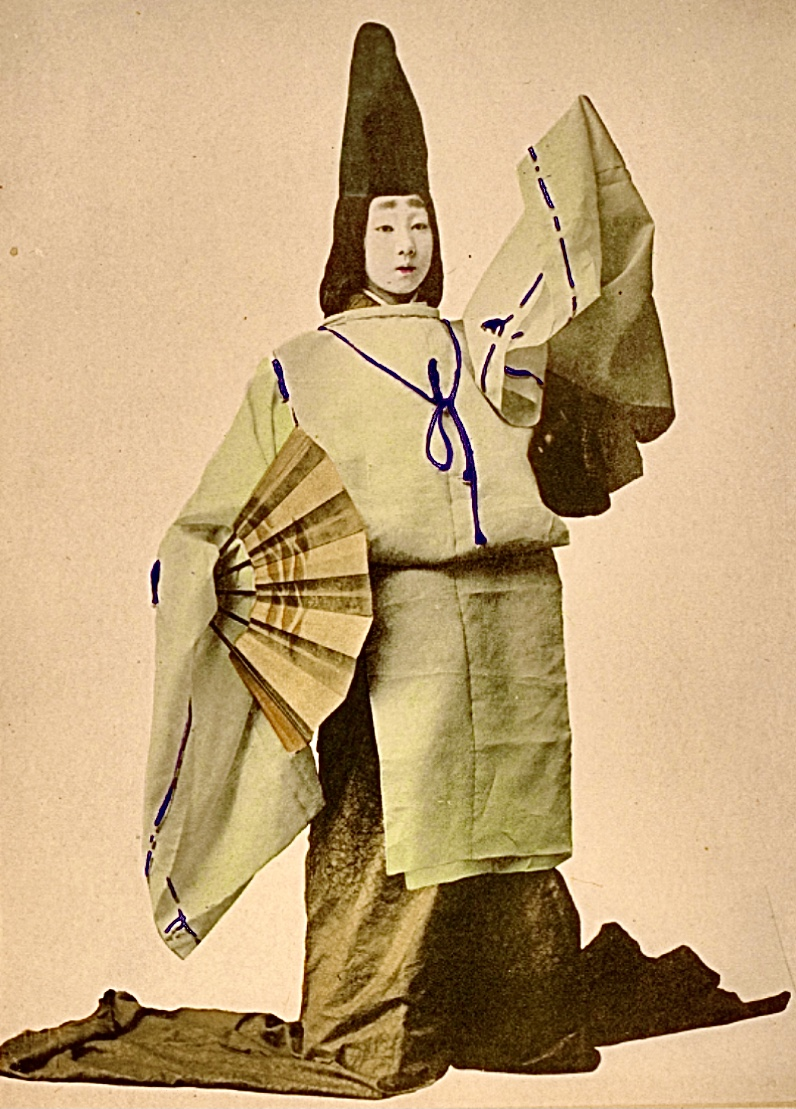
Miko (c. 1895) in ceremonial costume, including torikabuto (tall phoenix hat), purple cording, tabard, long robe with train and large hand fan

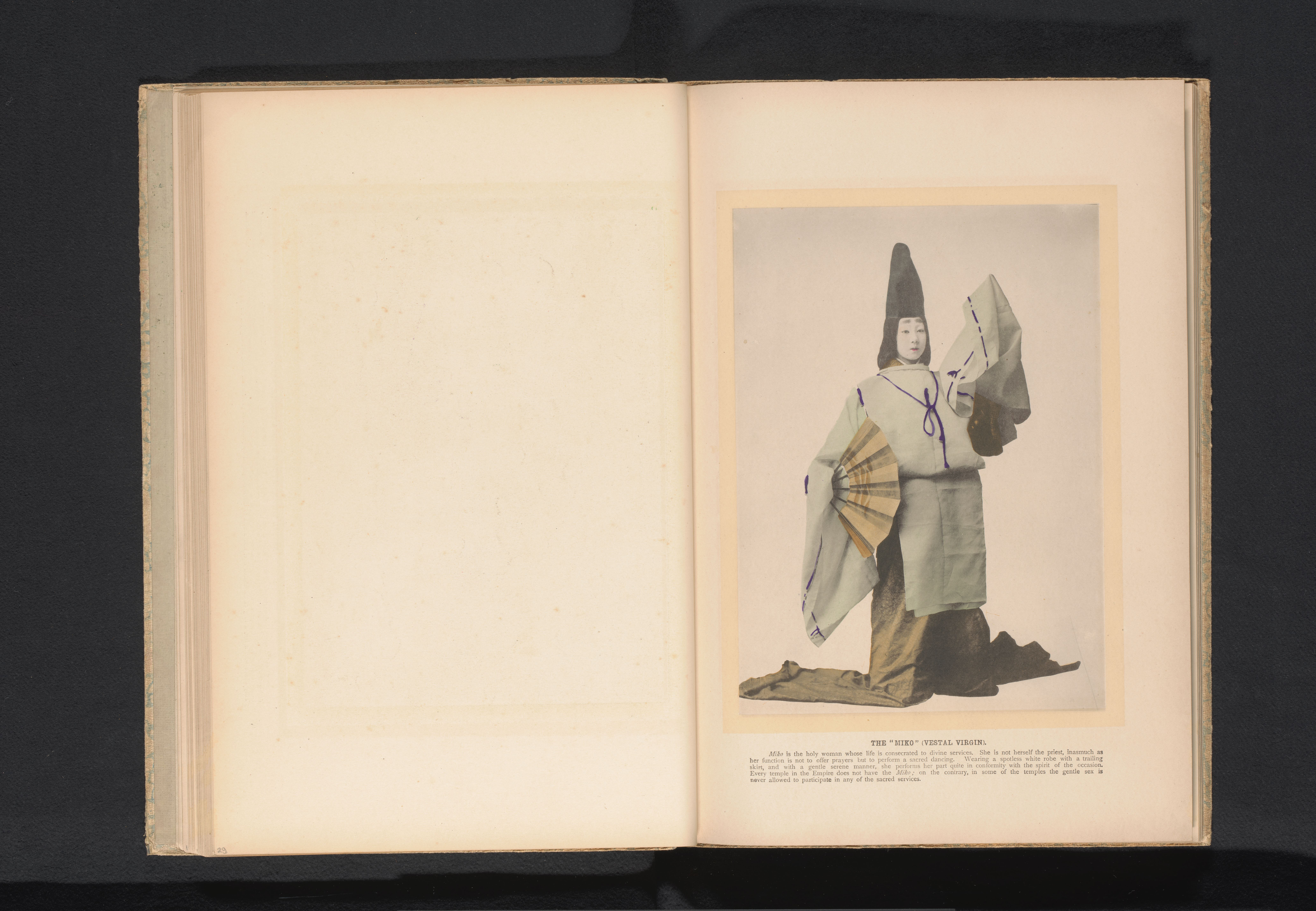
Original lithograph book plate with caption

The Japanese words miko and fujo ("female shaman" and "shrine maiden" respectively) are usually written 巫女 as a compound of the kanji 巫 ("shaman"), and 女 ("woman"). Miko was archaically written 神子 ("kami" + "child") and 巫子 ("shaman child").The terminology used for these women changed considerably over time. Under the ritsuryō legal system, female shrine priests were officially termed mikannagi, while the Shoku Nihongi instead refers to them as mikanko; the Edo-period dictionary Wakun no Shiori treats miko as a general term, reserving mikanko specifically for miko who recite norito, accounting for the variety of ways the word has historically been written. One further etymological theory holds that miko derives from an abbreviation of kamiko, denoting the substance (monozane) through which a kami manifests itself.

The term is not to be confused with miko meaning "prince", "princess" or "duke", and which is otherwise variously spelt 御子 ("august child"), 皇子 ("imperial child"), 皇女 ("imperial daughter", also pronounced himemiko), 親王 ("prince") or 王 ("king", "prince" or "duke"). These spellings of miko were commonly used in the titles of ancient Japanese nobles, such as Prince Kusakabe (草壁皇子, Kusakabe no Miko or Kusakabe no Ōji).

Miko once performed spirit possession and takusen (whereby the possessed person serves as a "medium" (yorimashi) to communicate the divine will or message of that kami or spirit; also included in the category of takusen is "dream revelation" (mukoku), in which a kami appears in a dream to communicate its will) as vocational functions in their service to shrines. As time passed, they left the shrines and began working independently in secular society. In addition to a medium or a miko (or a geki, a male shaman), the site of a takusen may occasionally also be attended by a sayaniwa who interprets the words of the possessed person to make them comprehensible to other people present. Kamigakari and takusen may be passive, when a person speaks after suddenly becoming involuntarily possessed or has a dream revelation; they can also be active, when spirit possession is induced in a specific person to ascertain the divine will or gain a divine revelation.

Miko are known by many names; Fairchild lists 26 terms for "shrine-attached Miko" and 43 for "non-shrine-attached Miko". Other names are ichiko (巫子, "shaman child"), or "market/town child" (巫子) (both likely ateji meaning "female medium; fortuneteller"), and reibai (霊媒, meaning "spirit go-between, medium").

In English, the word is often translated as "shrine maiden", though freer renderings often simply use the phrase "female shaman" (shamanka) or, as Lafcadio Hearn translated it, "Divineress". Some scholars prefer the transliteration miko, contrasting the Japanese Mikoism with other Asian terms for female shamans. As Fairchild explains:

Women played an important role in a region stretching from Manchuria, China, Korea and Japan to the [Ryukyu Islands]. In Japan these women were priestesses, soothsayers, magicians, prophets and shamans in the folk religion, and they were the chief performers in organized Shinto. These women were called Miko, and the author calls the complex "Mikoism" for lack of a suitable English word.

== Mikoism ==
=== History ===
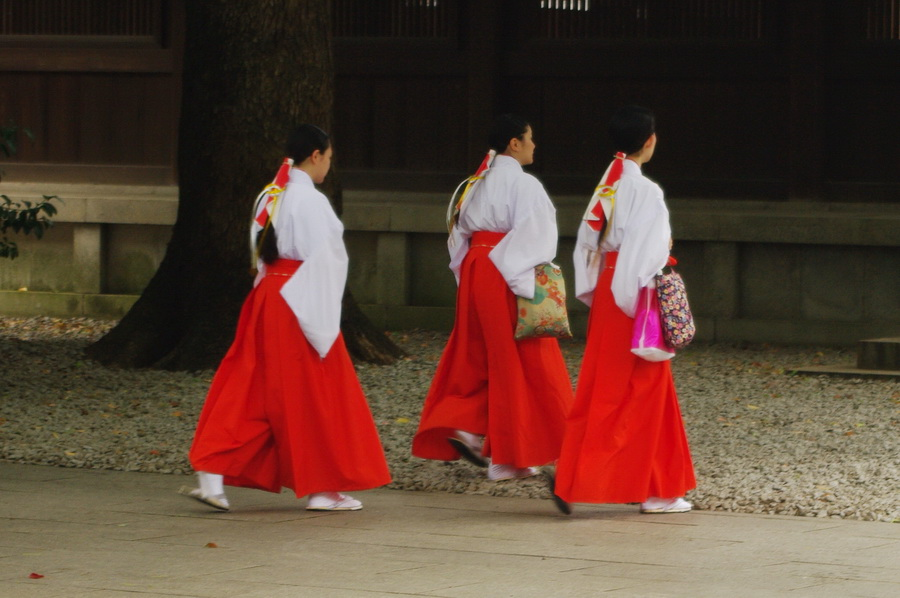
Their attire consists of a white kosode and red hakama. The hair is tied in a ponytail with a white and red hair ribbon.

Miko traditions date back to the prehistoric Jōmon period of Japan, when female shamans would go into "trances and convey the words of the gods" (the kami), an act comparable with "the pythia or sibyl in Ancient Greece."

The earliest record of anything resembling the term miko is of the Chinese reference to Himiko, Japan's earliest substantiated historical reference (not legendary); however, it is completely unknown whether Himiko was a miko, or even if miko existed in those days.

The early miko were important social figures who were "associated with the ruling class". "In addition to her ritual performances of ecstatic trance", writes Kuly, "[the miko] performed a variety of religious and political functions". One traditional school of miko, Kuly adds, "claimed to descend from the Goddess Uzume".

During the Nara period (710–794) and Heian period (794–1185), government officials tried to control miko practices. As Fairchild notes:

In 780 A.D. and in 807 A.D. official bulls against the practice of ecstasy outside of the authority of the shrines were published. These bulls were not only aimed at ecstasy, but were aimed at magicians, priests, sorcerers, etc. It was an attempt to gain complete control, while at the same time it aimed at eradicating abuses which were occurring.

During the feudal Kamakura period (1185–1333) when Japan was controlled by warring shōgun states:

[T]he miko was forced into a state of mendicancy as the shrines and temples that provided her with a livelihood fell into bankruptcy. Disassociated from a religious context, her performance moved further away from a religious milieu and more toward one of a non-ecclesiastical nature. The travelling miko, known as the aruki miko, became associated with prostitution. ... [T]he miko's stature as a woman close to the kami diminished as a patriarchal, militaristic society took over.

Originally, miko held ritualist functions in their own right, including the reception of oracles (takusen) while in a state of spirit possession; this role was gradually assumed instead by male ritual specialists, kannushi, hafuri, and negi, with miko progressively relegated to positions subordinate to them. A further distinction should be drawn between miko historically attached to a specific shrine and those who resided in a village or traveled the country as itinerant ritual specialists (kitōshi).

During the Edo period (1603–1868), writes Groemer, "the organizational structures and arts practiced by female shamans in eastern Japan underwent significant transformations". Though in the Meiji period (1868–1912), many shamanistic practices were outlawed:

After 1867 the Meiji government's desire to create a form of state Shinto headed by the emperor—the shaman-in-chief of the nation—meant that Shinto needed to be segregated from both Buddhism and folk-religious beliefs. As a result, official discourse increasingly repeated negative views of Miko and their institutions.

There was an edict called Miko Kindanrei (巫女禁断令) enforced by security forces loyal to Imperial forces, forbidding all spiritual practices by miko, issued in 1873, by the Religious Affairs Department (教部).

The Shinto kagura dance ceremony, which originated with "ritual dancing to convey divine oracles", has been transformed in the 20th century into a popular ceremonial dance called Miko-mai (巫女舞) or Miko-kagura (巫女神楽).

=== Traditional training ===
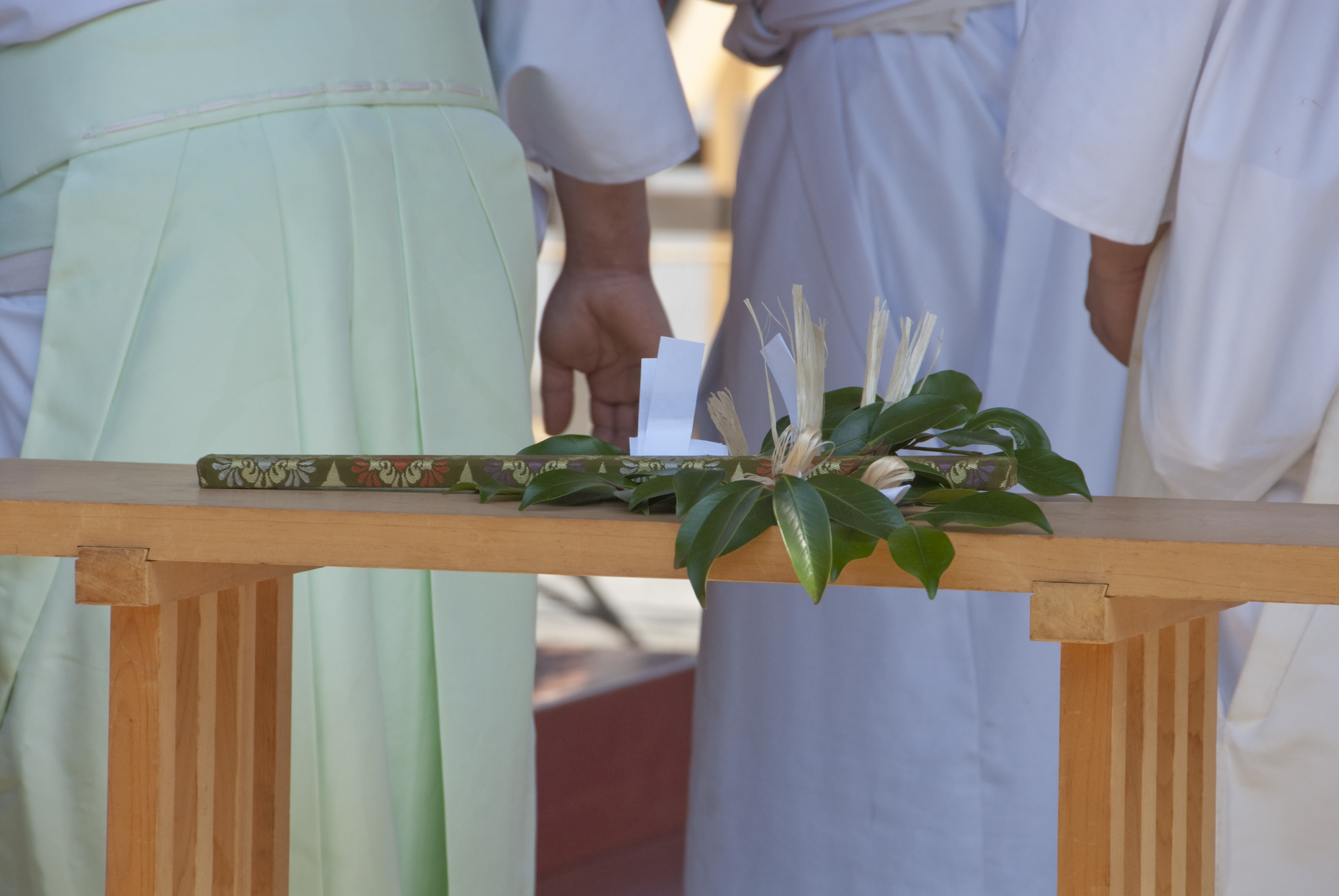
A tamagushi (traditional, ritual bundle of Sakaki (Cleyera japonica) twigs, of the type used by miko)

The position of a shaman passed from generation to generation, but sometimes someone not directly descended from a shaman went voluntarily into training or was appointed by the village chieftains. To achieve this, such a person had to have some potential.

To become a shaman, the girl (still at a young age, mostly after the start of the menstruation cycle) had to undergo very intensive training specific to the kuchiyose miko. An acknowledged elder shaman, who could be a family member (like an aunt) or a member of the tribe, would teach the girl in training the techniques required to be in control of her trance state. This would be done through rites including washings with cold water, regular purifying, abstinence and the observation of the common taboos like death, illness and blood. She would also study how to communicate with kami and spirits of the deceased, as a medium, by being possessed by those spirits. This was achieved by chanting and dancing, thus therefore the girl was taught melodies and intonations that were used in songs, prayers and magical formulas, supported by drum and rattlers.

Other attributes used for rites were mirrors (to attract the kami) and swords (katana). She also needed the knowledge of the several names of the kami that were important for her village, as well as their function. Finally she learned a secret language, only known by insiders (other shamans of the tribe) and so discovered the secrets of fortune-telling and magical formulas.

After the training, which could take three to seven years, the girl would get her initiation rite to become a real shaman. This mystic ceremony was witnessed by her mentor, other elders and fellow shamans. The girl wore a white shroud as a symbol for the end of her previous life. The elders began chanting and after a while the girl started to shiver. Next, her mentor would ask the girl which kami had possessed her and therefore be the one she would serve. As soon as she answered, the mentor would throw a rice cake into her face, causing the girl to faint. The elders would bring the girl to a warm bed and keep her warm until she woke up. When the whole ordeal was over and the girl had woken up, she was permitted to wear a coloured wedding dress and perform the corresponding tradition of the wedding toast.

The resemblance of a wedding ceremony as the initiation rite suggests that the trainee, still a virgin, had become the bride of the kami she served (called a Tamayori Hime (玉依姫)). During her trance, said kami had requested the girl to his shrine. In some areas of Japan she had to bring a pot filled with rice (meshibitsu) and a pan. An old, long-abandoned practice saw miko engage in sexual intercourse with a kannushi, who would represent the kami. Any resulting child would be considered the child of the kami (御子神, mikogami).

In some cases, girls or women were visited at night by a travelling spirit (稀人, marebito). After this visit, the woman announced to the public her new position of being possessed by a kami by placing a white-feathered arrow on the roof of her house.

== Contemporary miko ==
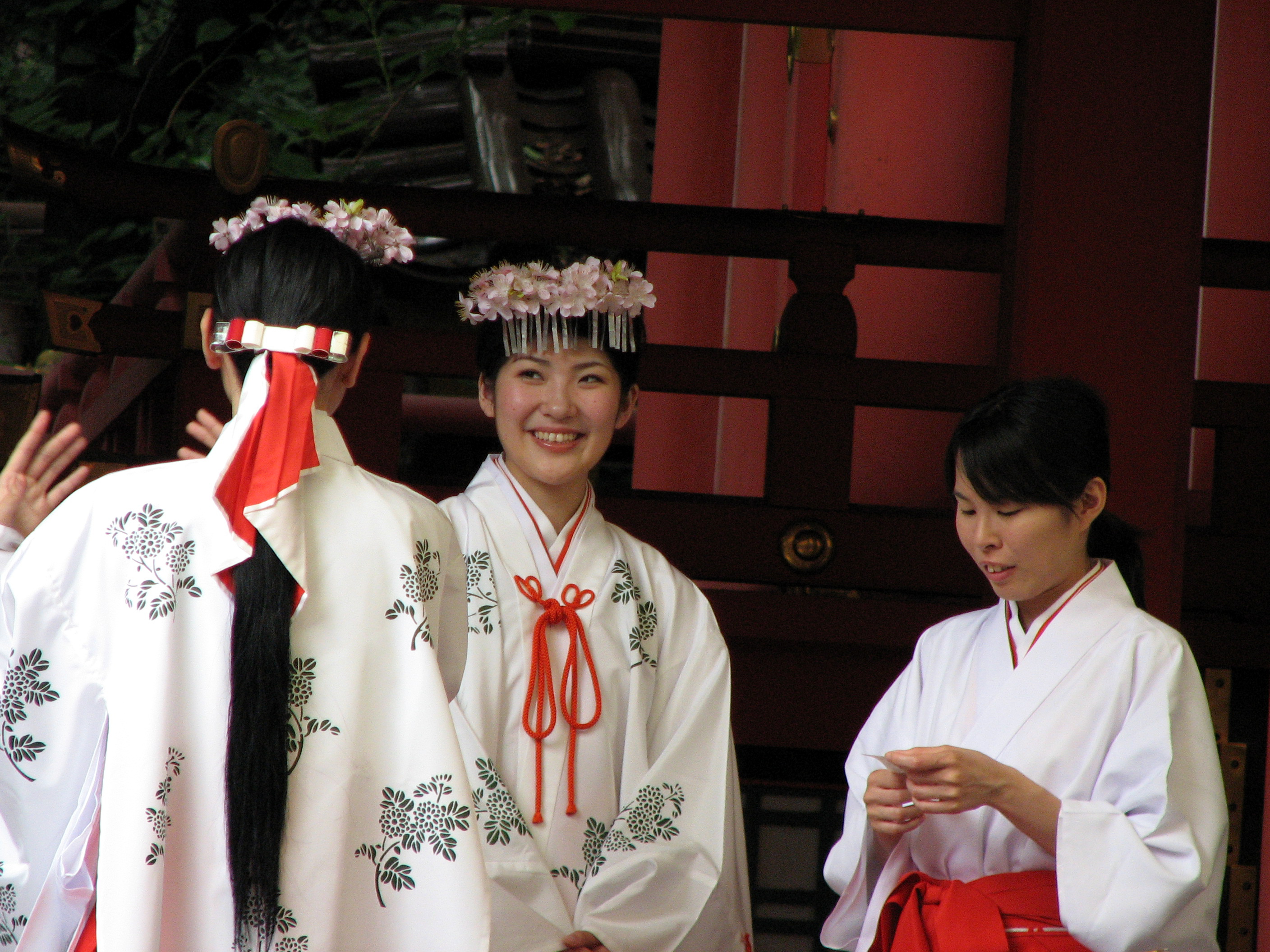
Miko at the Ikuta Shrine

Contemporary miko are often seen at Shinto shrines, where they assist with shrine functions, perform ceremonial dances, offer omikuji fortune telling, sell souvenirs, and assist a kannushi in Shinto rites. Kuly describes the contemporary miko as: "A far distant relative of her premodern shamanic sister, she is most probably a university student collecting a modest wage in this part-time position."

The ethnologist Kunio Yanagita (1875–1962), who first studied Japanese female shamans, differentiated them into jinja miko (神社巫女, "shrine shamans") who dance with bells and participate in yudate (湯立て, "boiling water") rites, kuchiyose miko (ロ寄せ巫女, "spirit medium shamans") who speak on behalf of the dead, and kami uba (神姥, "god women") who engage in cult worship and invocations (for instance, the Tenrikyo founder Nakayama Miki).

Researchers have further categorized contemporary miko in terms of their diverse traditions and practices. Such categorizations include blind itako (concentrated in north and east Japan), mostly-blind okamin (north and east Japan), blind waka or owaka (northeastern Japan), moriko (north and east of Tokyo), nono (central Japan), blind zatokaka (northwest Japan), sasa hataki who tap sasa ("bamboo grass") on their faces (northeast of Tokyo), plus family and village organizations. Others have divided miko or fujo by blindness between blind ogamiya (尾上屋, "invocation specialist") or ogamisama who perform kuchiyose and spirit mediumship and sighted miko or kamisama who perform divination and invocations.

In the eclectic Shugendō religion, priests who practiced ecstasy often married miko. Many scholars identify shamanic miko characteristics in Shinshūkyō ("New Religions") such as Sukyo Mahikari, Ōmoto, and Shinmeiaishinkai.

== See also ==
- Aconitum carmichaelii, flower named for torikabuto hat of miko
- Babaylan, female shamans in Filipino animism
- Bhikkhunī
- Bobohizan, female shamans among the Kadazan-Dusun
- Kanminchu
  - Kaminchu in Onarigami
  - Kaminchu in Ryukyuan religion
- Kannushi
- List of fictional Miko
- Mu (shaman), shamans (usually female) in Korean shamanism
- Noro (priestess)
- Nun

== General and cited references ==
- Aston, William George (1905). Shinto: way of the gods. Longmans, Green, and Co.
- Blacker, Carmen (1975. The Catalpa Bow: A Study of Shamanistic Practices in Japan. London: George Allen & Unwin.)
- Fairchild, William P. (1962). "Shamanism in Japan", Folklore Studies 21:1–122.
- Folklore Society, The (1899). Folklore, Volume 10. Great Britain.
- Groemer, Gerald (2007). "Female Shamans in Eastern Japan during the Edo Period", Asian Folklore Studies 66:27–53.
- Hardacre, Helen (1996). "Shinmeiaishinkai and the Study of Shamanism in Contemporary Japanese Life", in Religion in Japan, ed. by P.F. Kornicki and I.J. McMullen, Cambridge University Press, pp. 198–219.
- Hearn, Lafcadio (1894). Glimpses of Unfamiliar Japan Volume 1. Houghton, Mifflin and Company.
- Hori, Ichiro (1968). Folk Religion in Japan: Continuity and Change. Chicago: Univ. of Chicago Press. ISBN 0226353346.
- Kawamura Kunimitsu (2003). "A Female Shaman's Mind and Body, and Possession", Asian Folklore Studies 62.2:257–289.
- Kuly, Lisa (2003). "Locating Transcendence in Japanese Minzoku Geinô: Yamabushi and Miko Kagura," Ethnologies 25.1:191–208.
- (1906) North-China herald and Supreme Court & consular gazette, The Volume 79. North-China Herald.
- Ricci, Daniele (2012). Japanese Shamanism: trance and possession. Volume Edizioni (Kindle Edition).
- Picken, Stuart D. B. (2006). The A to Z of Shinto. Scarecrow Press.
- Waley, Arthur (1921). The Noh Plays of Japan.
