= An (Shinto) =

Small table, desk or platform used during Shinto ceremonies

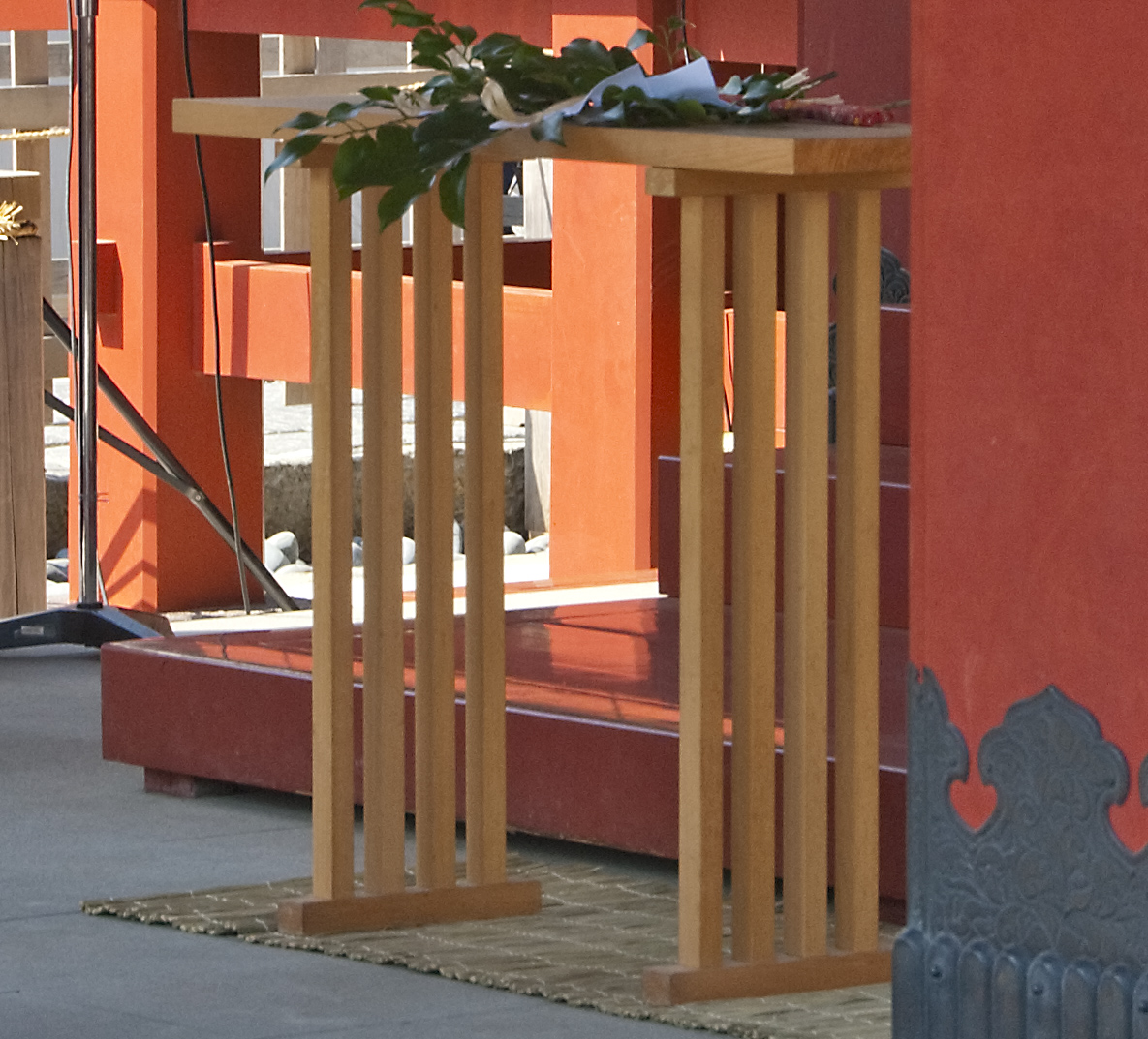
A hakkyaku-an carrying a tamagushi

The An (案) is a small table, desk or platform used during Shinto ceremonies to bear offerings. It may have four, eight or sixteen legs; the eight-legged variety, called hassoku-an or hakkyaku-an (八足案, 八脚案; lit. "eight-legged table"), is the most common.

== See also ==
- Glossary of Shinto, for an explanation of terms concerning Shinto, Shinto art, and Shinto shrine architecture.
- Basic Terms of Shinto, Kokugakuin University, Institute for Japanese Culture and Classics, Tokyo 1985
