= Tamagushi =

Shinto tree branch offering

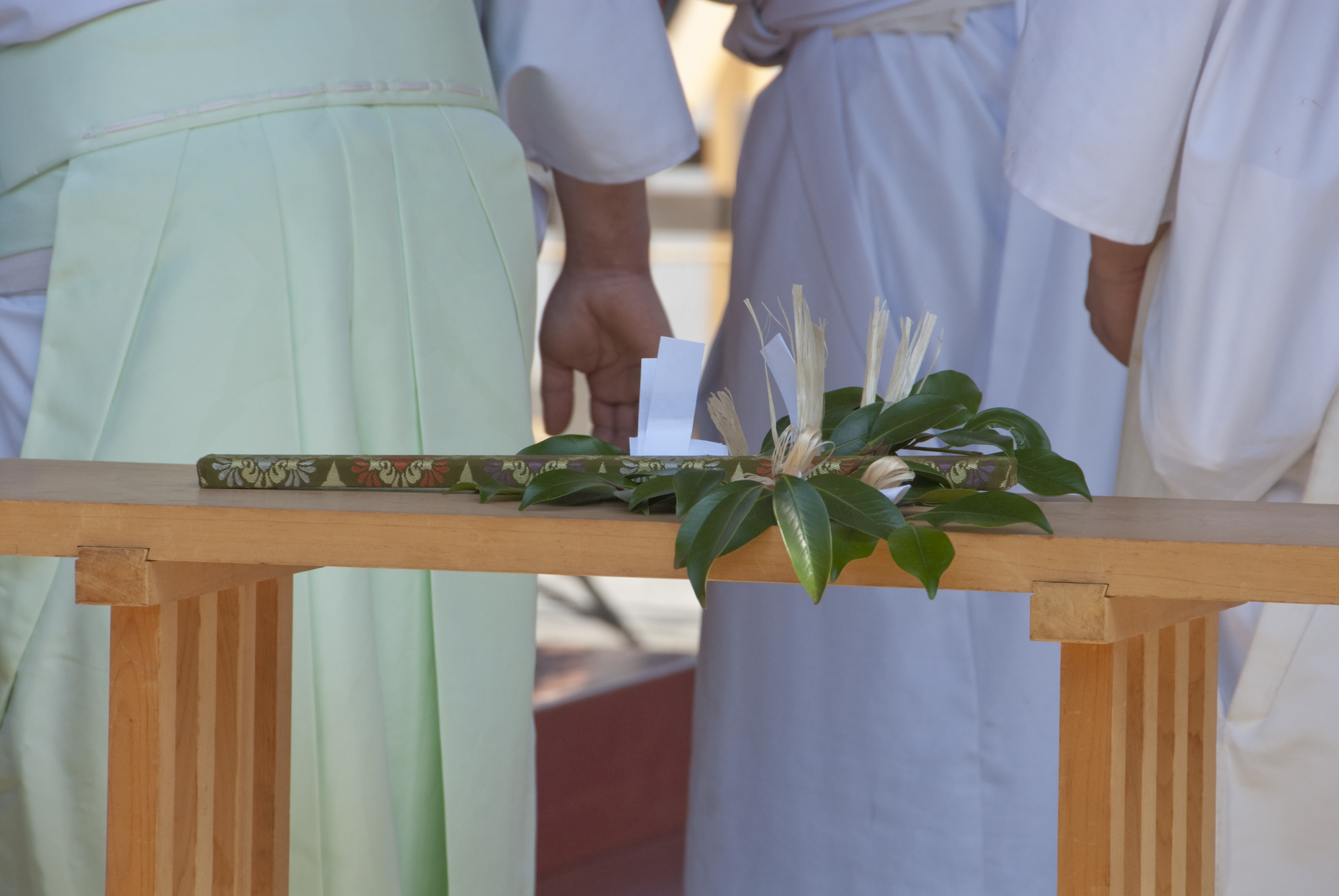
A tamagushi on a table (an) during a ceremony

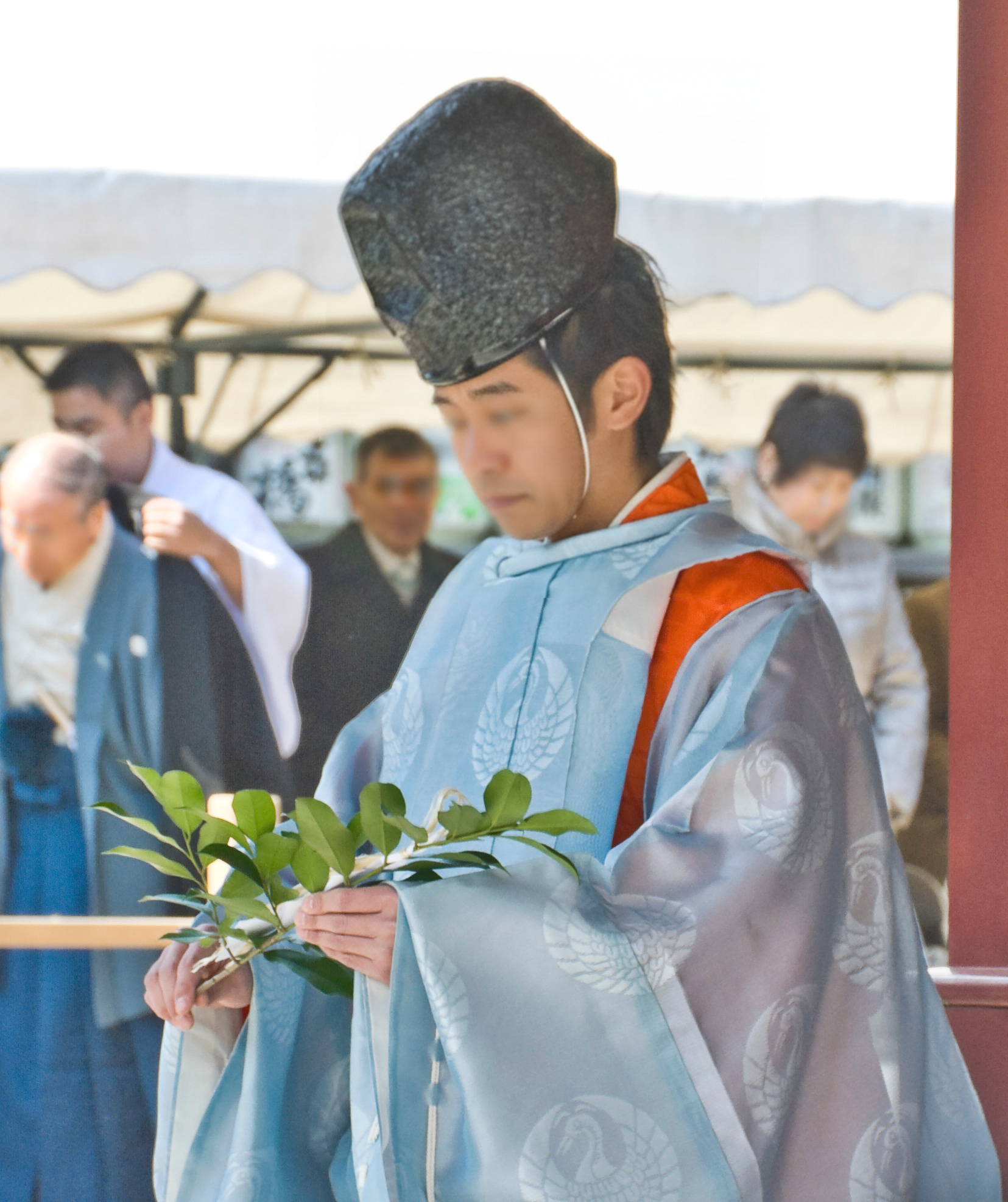
A kannushi holding a tamagushi

Tamagushi (玉串; literally "jewel skewer") is a form of Shinto offering made from a sakaki-tree branch decorated with shide strips of washi paper, silk, or cotton. At Japanese weddings, funerals, miyamairi and other ceremonies at Shinto shrines, tamagushi are ritually presented to the kami (spirits or gods) by parishioners, shrine maidens or kannushi priests.

== Linguistic history ==
The Japanese word tamagushi is usually written with the kanji tama 玉 "jade; gem; jewel; precious; ball; bead" and kushi 串 "string together; skewer; spit; stick", or sometimes written 玉ぐし with hiragana since the official Tōyō kanji do not include 串.

The earliest recorded transcription of tamagushi is 玉籤, using kuji 籤 "bamboo slip; (divination) lot; written oracle; raffle; lottery" instead of kushi. The (c. 720 CE) Nihon Shoki "Chronicles of Japan", which repeatedly mentions a 500-branched masakaki 真榊 "true sakaki" tree (tr. Aston 1896:43, 47, 121), is the locus classicus for tamagushi 玉籤.

This mytho-history records a legend that when the sun-goddess Amaterasu got angry with her brother Susano'o and closed the door on the "Rock-cave of Heaven", the gods decorated a giant sakaki tree in order to lure the sun out of the darkness.

Then all the Gods were grieved at this, and forthwith caused Ama no nuka-do no Kami, the ancestor of the Be ["clan; guild"] of mirror-makers, to make a mirror, Futo-dama, the ancestor of the Imibe [weavers' clan], to make offerings, and Toyo-tama, the ancestor of the Be of jewel-makers, to make jewels. They also caused Yama-Tuschi [Mountain-god] to procure eighty precious combs of the five-hundred-branched true sakaki tree, and Nu-dzuchi [Moor-god] to procure eighty precious combs of the five-hundred-branched Suzuki grass. (tr. Aston 1896:47)

This "precious combs" translation derives from tama 玉 (tr. "Toyo-tama" and "jewels") and kushi 櫛 "comb", which is a Nihon Shoki graphic variant of kuji 籤 in the goddess named Tamakushi Hime 玉櫛姫 (tr. "jewel-comb" Aston 1896:62).

The (c. 645–760 CE) Man'yōshū "Myriad Leaves Collection" does not use the word tamagushi but one poem (tr. Pierson 1929–1938:199) describes making it with paper mulberry: "I tie pure white strands of mulberry to the branches of the sacred tree".

Some common tamagushi collocations include:

- tamagushi o sasageru 玉串を捧げる "offer a tamagushi"
- tamagushi hōnō 玉串奉納 "dedicate/offer tamagushi [in front of a shrine altar]"
- tamagushi-ryō 玉串料 "[cash] offerings for tamagushi [presented at a shrine]"

Tamagushi has an uncommon secondary meaning of "name for the sakaki tree". The (c. 1439 CE) Shin Kokin Wakashū "New Collection of Ancient and Modern Poems" (tr. Carr 1995:8) contains the first occurrence, "Holding the ornamented tamagushi leaves".

The sakaki (Cleyera japonica) is a flowering evergreen tree, which is considered sacred in Japanese mythology. In the present day, Shinto shrines often plant it as a sakaiki (境木 "boundary tree") to demarcate sanctified space. Sakaki is written with the kanji 榊, which graphically combines boku or ki 木 "tree; wood" and shin or kami 神 "spirit; god", compare Shinboku (神木 "sacred tree"). Carr (1995:11) characterizes 榊 as "a doubly exceptional logograph"; it is an ideograph "character representing an idea" (which is an infrequent type of logograph "character representing a word", see Chinese character classification), and it is a kokuji 国字 "national character; Japanese-made character" (rather than a typical kanji 漢字 "Chinese character" loanword).

== Etymology ==
The etymology of tamagushi, like many Japanese words, is uncertain. Despite consensus that -gushi 串 means "skewer; stick" (of sakaki), the original signification of tama- 玉 "jade; jewel; ball" remain obscure. The Kokugaku scholar Motoori Norinaga (1730–1801) suggested an etymon of tamukegushi 手向け串 "hand-offered stick/skewer". The Shinto theologian Hirata Atsutane (1776–1843) proposed "bejeweled stick/skewer", with tama 玉 referring to decorative "jewels" (cf. tama 珠 "jewel; pearl; bead"). The famous ethnologist Kunio Yanagita (1875–1962) hypothesized "spiritual stick/skewer", with tama 玉 meaning tama 霊 "spirit; soul" (believed to be shaped like a tama 球 "ball; sphere; globe").

== The Ehime lawsuit ==
Tamagushi was central to the "Ehime-ken Yasukuni jinjā tamagushi soshō" 愛媛県靖国神社玉串訴訟 "Ehime Prefecture's Yasukuni Shrine tamagushi lawsuit" over the constitutional separation of state and religion (see Nelson 1999 or Morimura 2003 for details).

Although Article 20 of the Constitution of Japan prohibits the state establishment of religion and Article 89 forbids expenditure of public money "for the use, benefit, or maintenance of any religious institution", the Ehime Governor officially paid for tamagushi-ryō 玉串料 "tamagushi offerings" presented at several Shinto shrines. In 1982, a group of prefectural residents sued his office for having misappropriated ¥ 166,000 (approximately US $1900) in public funds. On March 17, 1989, the Matsuyama District Court ruled the tamagushi offerings were unconstitutional and ordered the defendants to repay the prefecture. On May 12, 1992, the Takamatsu High Court overturned the Matsuyama decision, reasoning that the Shinto offerings were constitutionally allowed within the realm of "social protocol". On April 2, 1997, the Supreme Court of Japan overturned that decision and made a landmark ruling that tamagushi offerings were unconstitutional.

The question of what constitutes support of State Shinto remains controversial. For instance, the reformist politician Ichirō Ozawa disagrees with the court ruling.

There are some instances where the values specified in the constitution are not in accord with the Japanese traditional culture. The Shinto rite of worshipping one's ancestors is very different from the idea of religion in the West. The 'Tamagushirō Decision' of the Supreme Court against Ehime Prefecture, which declared that making donations to purchase tamagushi was against the Constitution based on the religious freedom of Article 20, would not strike the Japanese (who believe in many gods) as anti-constitutional. Perhaps it would be better to impose restrictions on religious freedom only in order to suppress the development of state-sponsored religious fascism. (2001:169)

== See also ==
- Masakaki
- Klila in Mandaeism
