= Masakaki =

Shinto ritual object

Masakaki at Yasaka Shrine

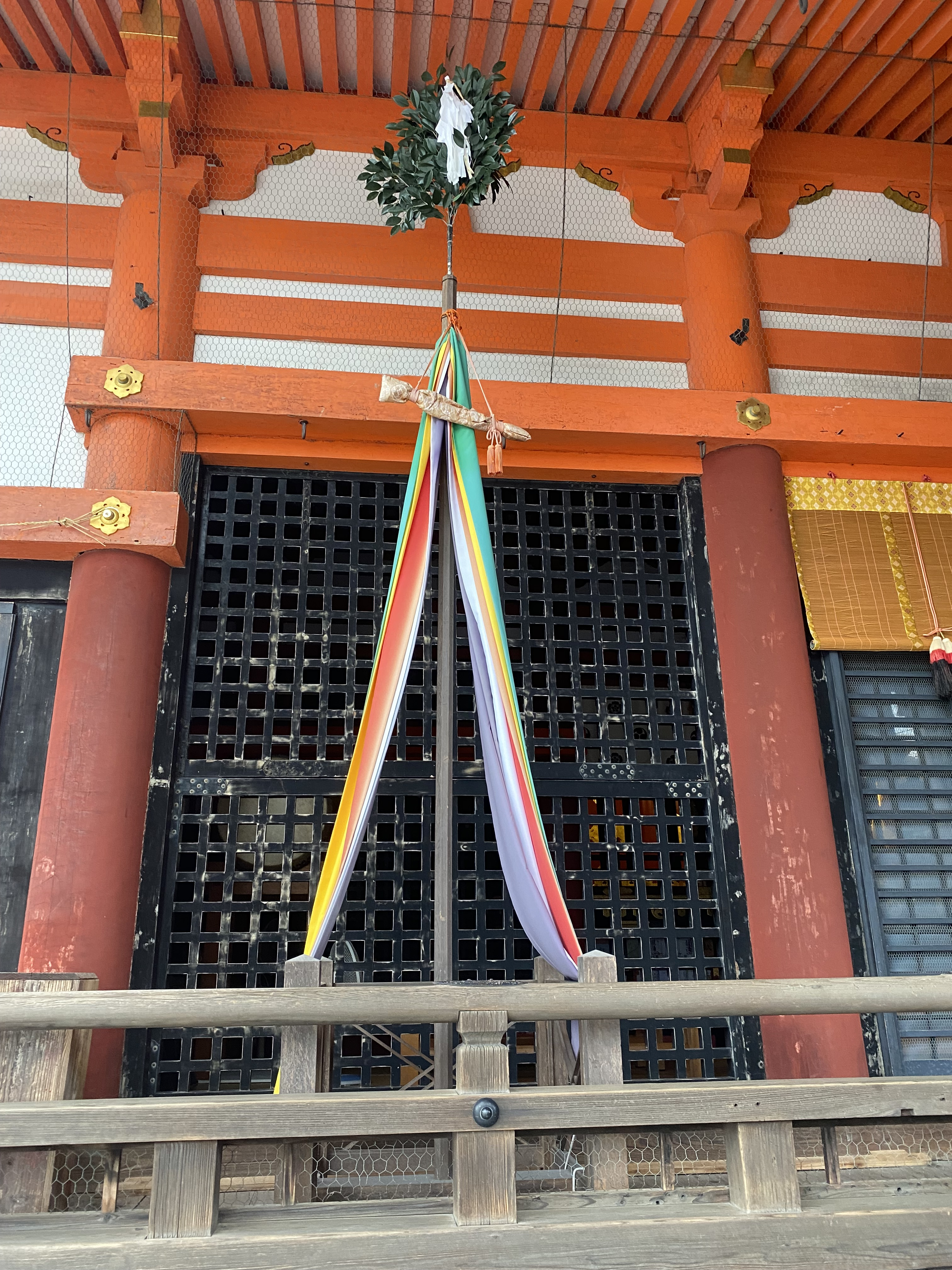
Left masakaki with sword

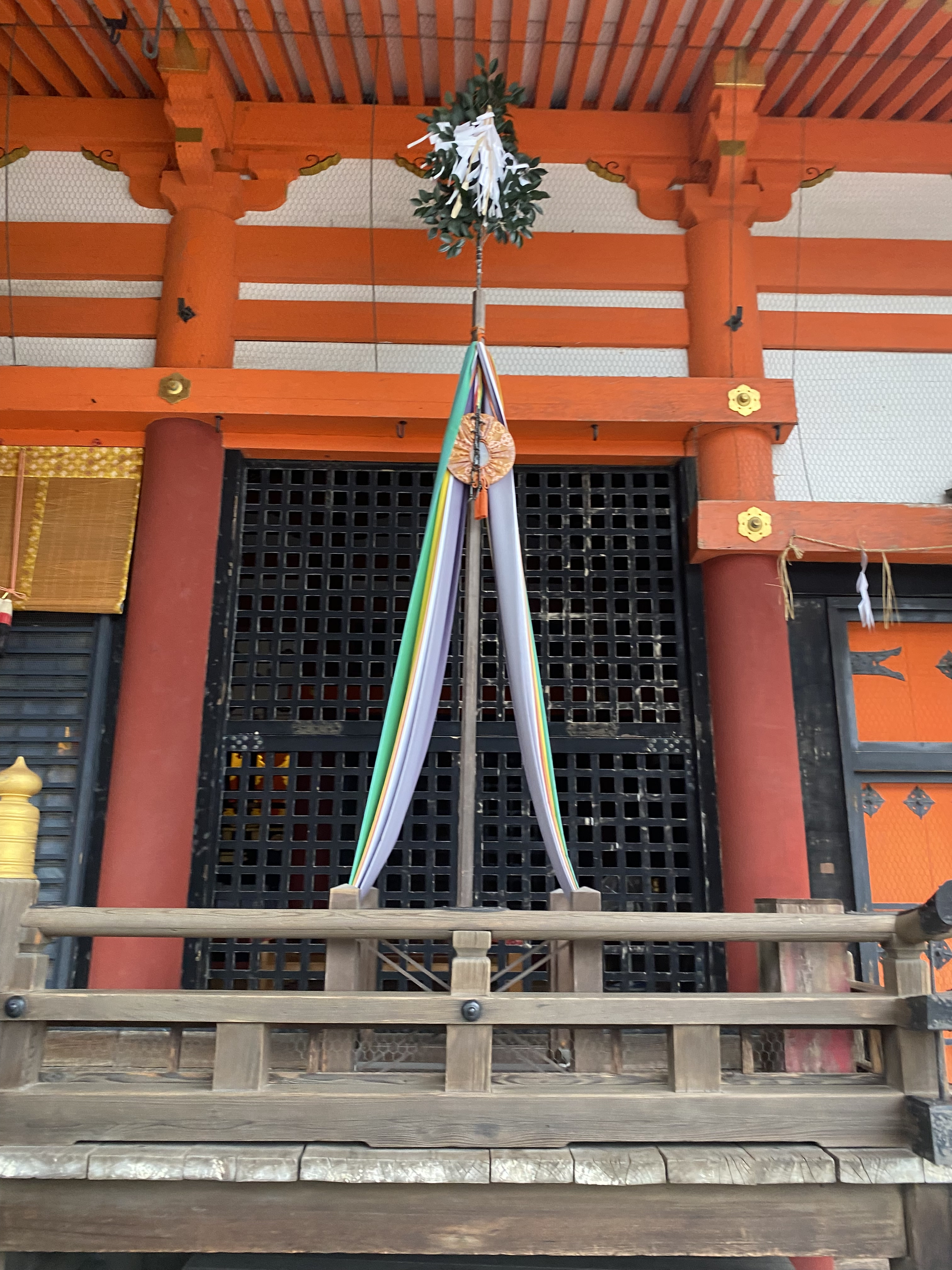
Right masakaki with mirror and magatama

Masakaki (真榊) are decorative implements made with sakaki used in Shinto rituals. Historically, they took many different forms, but their modern form was solidified in 1875. They come in sets of two, each one an upright Japanese cypress pole with a sakaki branch on top, and five colored streamers of blue, yellow, red, white, and purple attached below the sakaki branch. The left masakaki is then decorated with a sword, and the right with a mirror and jewel.

== See also ==
- Tamagushi
- Sakaki
