= Ichiko =

- Gender: Female

Origin
- Origin: Japanese
- Meaning: Different meanings depending on the kanji used

Ichiko (written: 一子, 市子, 伊知子, 以知子 or イチコ in katakana) is a feminine Japanese given name. Notable people with the name include:

- Ichiko (musician) (イチコ; born 1970), Japanese singer-songwriter
- Ichiko Aoba (青葉 市子; born 1990), Japanese singer-songwriter
- Ichiko Hashimoto (musician) (橋本 一子; born 1952), Japanese musician, composer and singer
- Ichiko Sato (佐藤 伊知子; born 1965), Japanese volleyball player
- Ichiko Kamichika (神近 市子; 1888 – 1981), Japanese journalist, feminist, writer, translator, and critic.
- Ichiko Hashimoto (橋本 市子), Japanese J-Pop singer who was part of the group Aurora Gonin Musume

== Fictional characters ==
- Ichiko Ono (小野 以知子), a character in the anime OVA Munto
- Ichiko Sakura (桜 市子), protagonist of the manga series Binbō-gami ga!
