= Ryukyuan religion =

Indigenous Ryukyuan belief system

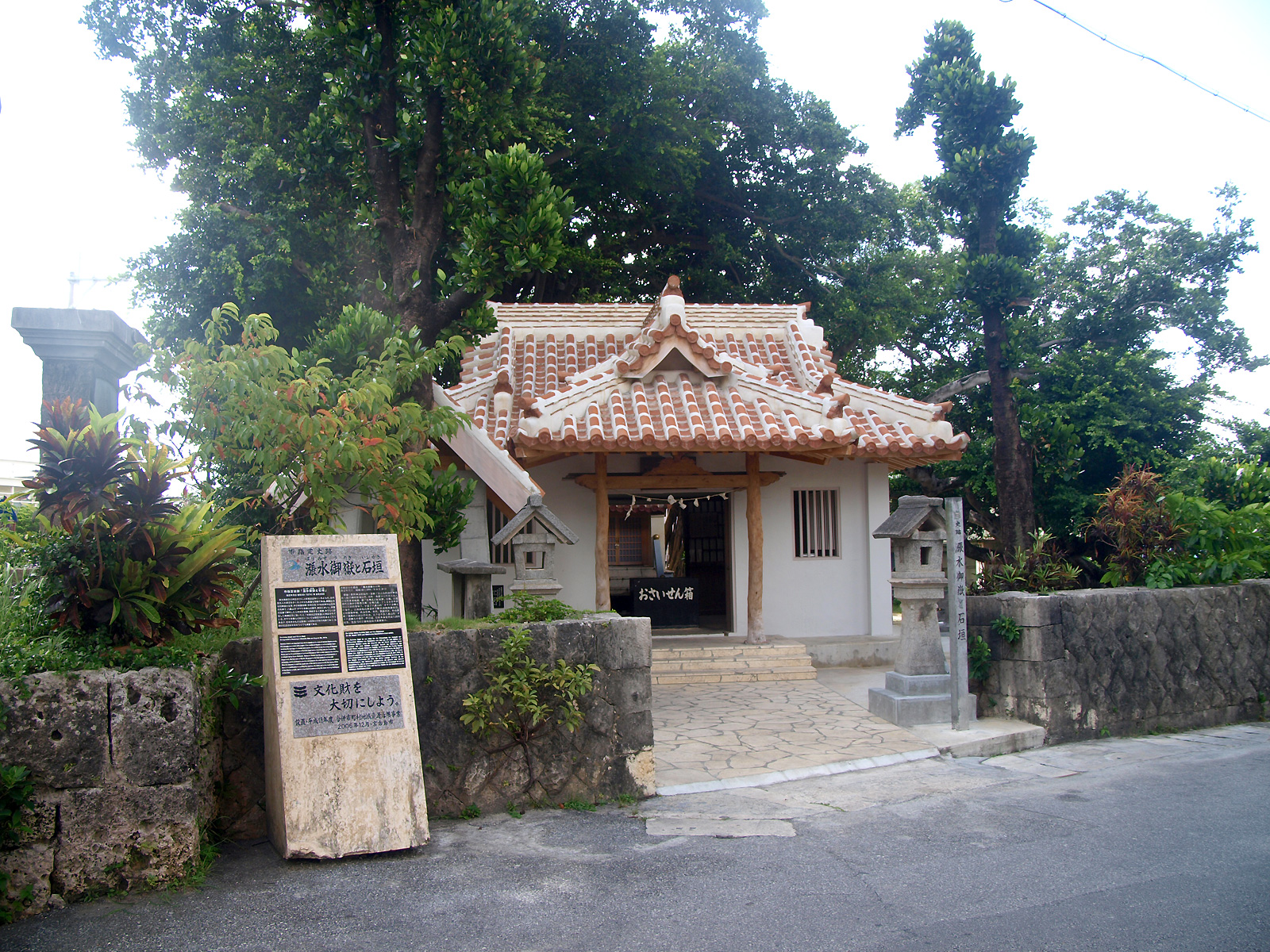
Harimizu utaki (Harimizu Shrine), a Ryukyuan shrine in Miyakojima, Okinawa Prefecture.

The Ryukyuan religion, Ryūkyū Shintō (琉球神道), Nirai Kanai Shinkō (ニライカナイ信仰), or Utaki Shinkō (御嶽信仰) is the indigenous belief system of the Ryukyu Islands.

While specific legends and traditions may vary slightly from place to place and island to island, the Ryukyuan religion is generally characterized by ancestor worship and the respecting of relationships between the living, the dead, and the gods and spirits of the natural world.

Some of its beliefs, such as those concerning protective spirits and many other beings classified between gods and humans, are indicative of its ancient animistic roots, as is its concern with mabui (まぶい), or life essence.

Over time, Ryukyuan religious practice has been influenced by Japanese Shinto, Buddhism, Confucianism, and Taoism. It has also been shaped by Chinese religions such as White Lotus, Chinese Manichaeism, and folk beliefs. One of its most ancient features is the belief in onarigami (おなり神), the spiritual superiority of women derived from Amamikyu, which allowed for the development of a noro (priestess) system and a significant following for yuta (female mediums or shamans).

== Family-centered worship ==
Ryukyuan religion, with its focus on demonstrating respect of and reverence toward ancestors, is naturally based in the family home. The oldest female relative acts as a primary celebrant, officiating rituals concerning ancestors, household gods and those family members who live both in and outside the home. Daily incense offerings are made and prayer "reports" are delivered aloud: each family member is described for the benefit of the incorporeal being addressed. The oldest female relative is also responsible for cleaning and upkeep of the buchidan (ancestors altar), hinukan (hearth god and his home on the hearth), and furugan (bathroom god).

=== Ancestors and their relationship to time ===
The Ultimate Ancestors, those from whom all life springs, are Utin ("Heaven", the father), Jiichi ("Earth", the mother), and Ryūgū ("Sea", the place from which we were born). They originate and exist, along with kami, or the gods of the world, during the Usachi-yu, the "Ancient Age". They are held in highest regard as the originators of all things and are worshiped in the community's utaki (御嶽). Ancestors living in the distant past, but not in the Usachi-yu – that is, ancestors living more than about 25 generations ago but not living with the gods at the beginning of time – are said to be living in Nakaga-yu, the "Middle Age". These ancestors are worshipped as collective spirits called futuchi (futuki), whose worship is focused usually in Buddhist temples. Other, more immediate ancestors are those who lived between the present day and the twenty-fifth generation into the past, a time period called Ima-ga-yuu, the "Present Age". They are those enshrined in the family home's buchidan, and it is these ancestors who visit on special occasions in the home and at the haka ("family tomb", v.inf).

=== Hinukan ===
Hinukan (火ぬ神) is a hearth god, represented by three small stones and usually located in the kitchen. As his name suggests, he is essentially a fire god, but more specifically, he is the guardian of the "family fire"; his worship is officiated by the family matriarch. Hinukan, by extension, is also the guardian of sacred communal fire; his worship is officiated by the community priestess. Hinukan, while he inhabits the family home, does not regard it as his own home and, in fact, leaves to return to his home to celebrate the solar New Year. Hinukan is also known as the God of the Hearth (竈神, Kamdokami) and is the local name of Kōjin in mainland Japan.

=== Fuuru nu Kami ===
The fuuru nu kami, or "god of the toilet", is the family protector of the area of waste. The pig toilet, lacking this benevolent god, could become a place of evil influence and potential haunting (such as by an akaname, or other negative spirits, welcomed by the accumulation of waste matter, rejected and abandoned by the human body). Because he is considered a primary household god, the fuuru nu kami's habitat (the bathroom) is kept clean and is perceived to warrant deferential behavior. Reports on the family's status are delivered regularly to the fuuru nu kami. He shares traits with the Korean bathroom goddess, Cheukshin.

== Eight Shrines of Ryūkyū ==
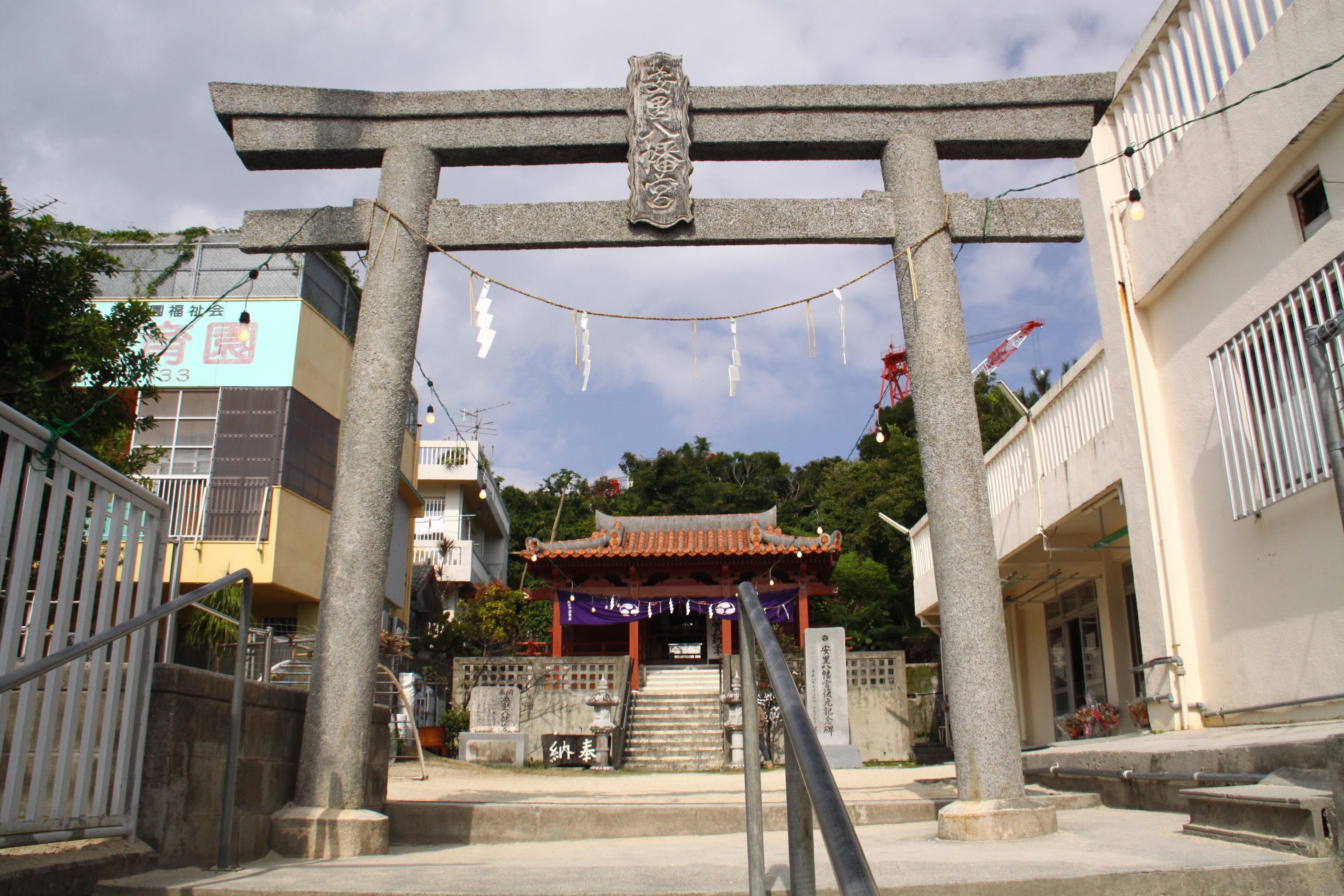
Asato Hachiman Shrine

Ryukyuans practiced Shinto and Buddhism. The Eight Shrines of Ryūkyū were a group of shrines that received special status and support from the Ryukyu Kingdom's royal government. These shrines played a significant role in the kingdom's religious and political life. 7 of them are dedicated to Kumano Shrine and the other is Hachiman.

According to Ryūkyū-koku yurai-ki, the Amekugu shrine’s origin dates to the reign of the Chenghua Emperor (1465–1487) of Ming China. A villager of Mekaru reportedly encountered a noble woman descending from Mount Ameku, accompanied by a Buddhist monk. She was observed entering a small cave and vanishing. When the event was reported to the Ryukyu court, officials offered incense at the cave, which ignited on its own.

A divine oracle then declared, “I am Kumano Gongen. The woman is the guardian deity of the realm, the deity known as Benzaiten.” A shrine was subsequently built to honour her. From this tradition arose the belief that the Ryukyu Islands are a manifested domain (honji) of Benzaiten, who protects the nation and ensures the well-being of its people. According to the honji suijaku practice, Benzaiten is Ichikishima-hime.

== At the tomb ==
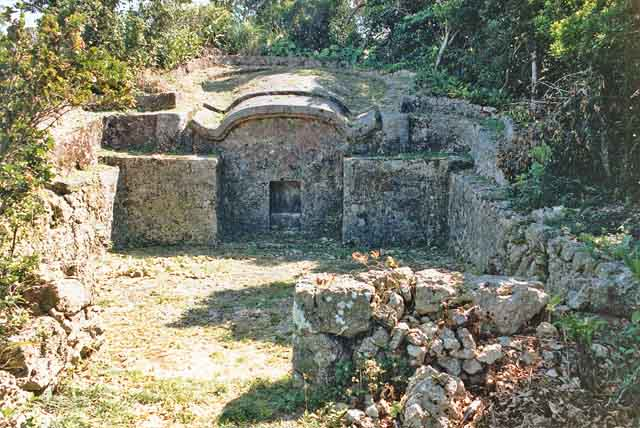
A haka, or family tomb, of the turtle-back variety.

Traditionally, periodic gatherings of the extended family occur at the family haka, or "tomb" (v. inf. for information concerning the traditional dates of these gatherings). The tombs resemble houses, complete with a courtyard (naa), family name markers, and "porch" upon which offerings are arranged. A common tomb style in many areas is the so-called turtle-back tomb (kamekokata), whose roof is shaped as the carapace of a tortoise. These tombs have variously been described as "horseshoe-shaped" or "omega-shaped" tombs by Westerners, but Okinawans believe they are shaped like a womb; the dead "return to the source". Another very common type is the gable tomb (hafukokata), which appears like a small Okinawan house. Though not haka, the royal tombs of the Ryūkyū Kingdom are located at Tamaudun.

Inside the tomb is stored the cremated remains (funishin) of several generations of family members. Especially important is the thirty-third year after a relative's death; at this point, the deceased individual is believed to have taken their place with all their ancestors in the afterlife. During a typical extended family gathering at the tomb, incense, food, offering, and prayers are offered to ancestors, and then a picnic is enjoyed by those in attendance. Although responsibilities may vary on a case-by-case basis, generally it is the oldest male of a family whose financial responsibility is upkeep for existing tombs and establishment of new tombs if anything should happen to the old, including becoming too full.

Various taboos exist in relation to the tomb. It is rude to point at a tomb, speak loudly concerning the dead around a tomb, or take pictures of a tomb without expressed permission. It is considered dangerous to desecrate a tomb with graffiti, by disturbing offerings such as flowers, or by damaging the tomb in any way. Also considered dangerous may be to approach a tomb without proper authority (such as relation to the family) or to visit a tomb at night.

== Other gods, goddesses, and spirits ==
The most-often worshiped gods are undoubtedly those of the home; however, especially powerful deities are revered by the community as a whole, and certain legendary creatures exist who are not worshiped, but are respected.

=== Community worship ===
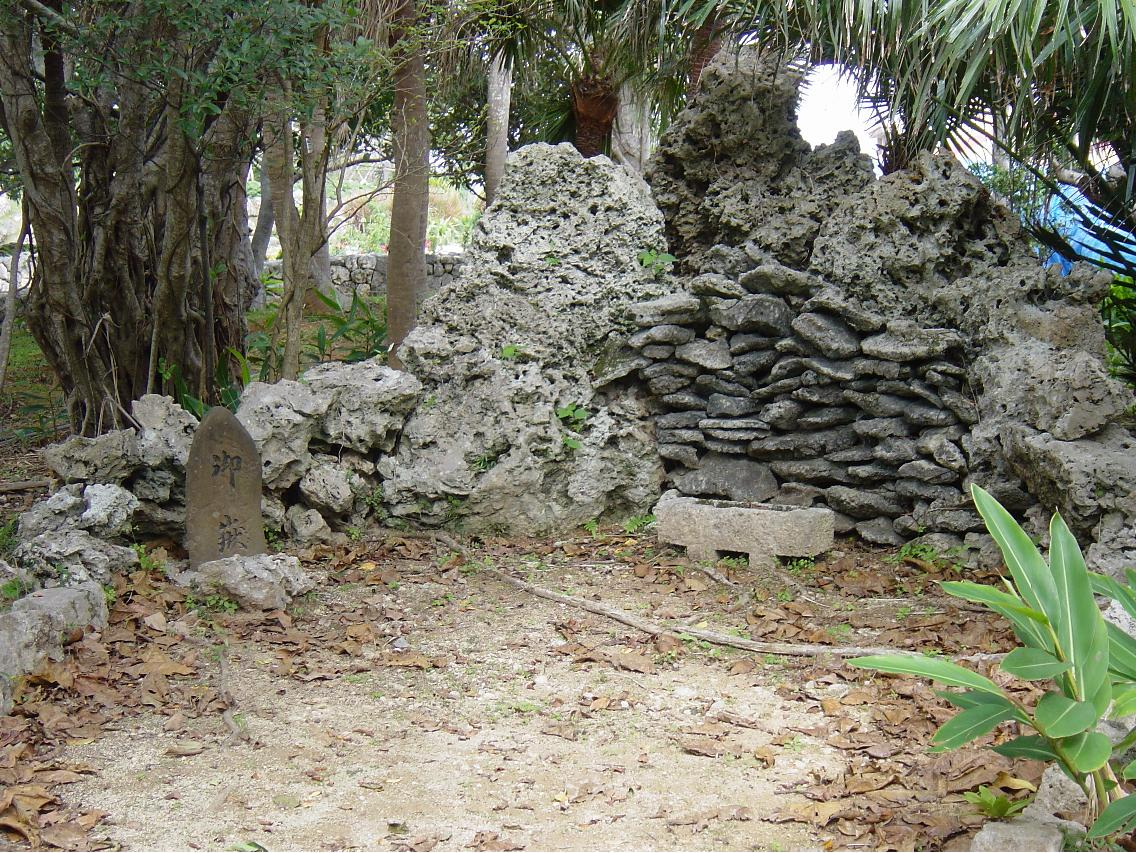
A model utaki set up near Motobu in Okinawa.

Community worship most often involves that of marine and mountain deities, who determine the success of agricultural, shipping/trade, and fishing pursuits. Community worship also includes chthonic spirits inhabiting rocks, trees, caves, and springs, who receive offerings and are respected with deference in their province (such as by not moving the rock, harming the tree, or entering the grove or cave).

Especially old or powerful ancestors act as local deities and inhabit an utaki, or "sacred place". This is usually a grove, a spring, or a cave located near the village, entrance to which is sometimes restricted and sanctity of which is always respected. The most sacred spot in an utaki is the ibi and the area around it (the ibi nu mae). Only the noro may enter the ibi to make offerings and prayers on the ibi nu mae.

Examples of famous utaki are Sefa-utaki (the most sacred official place in the Ryūkyū Kingdom). Legend has it that the goddess Amamikyu, who gave birth to the islands of the Ryukyus, descended here. From this sacred grove, people prayed to Kudaka Island, Okinawa's most sacred place. Once the inaugurations of the high priestess of the Shuri Court, kikoe-ōgimi, took place there.

As mentioned, Kudaka Island is the site of many utaki. Other especially sacred places in and around Okinawa include the area around Nakijin Castle and Gusukuyama (or Tacchu), a high, steep peak on Ie-shima.

The line between kami, ancestors, and other spirits may be faint in community ancestor worship, such as when especially ancient ancestors are worshipped as with the same respect as other, never-corporeal kami. This is because "kami" is a broad term, meaning not only "god" but less specifically "concentration of spiritual energy"; thus, in the example of the especially ancient ancestors, they are treated as kami because of their power. Also, when a noro assumes the form of a god, she becomes the locus of this great energy, and thus is a kami.

=== Negative spirits ===
Negative spirits in Okinawa are often referred to as "ghosts" in English, although they are not necessarily "ghosts" in the Western sense of the world (wandering souls of the dead). Those believed to visibly appear are usually the spirits of those who met an especially horrible end or those who did not receive proper funerary rites. As World War II fighting in Okinawa was particularly protracted and heavy, there are many tales of ghosts and haunted places with military-related origin stories. Other negative spirits are incorporeal chthonic beings classifiable between spirits of the dead and gods.

Negative spirits are believed to be irritated or angered by human presence. Negative spirits are responsible for accidents, illnesses, and deaths befalling those who have had contact with their habitation. Thus even today, haunted places are especially sacrosanct, to the point that many people refuse to develop otherwise suited properties or live next to beautiful areas because they have been judged to be inhabited by a negative spirit. An especially famous example of this is the half-finished Nakagusuku Hotel ruins that stand within walking distance from Nakagusuku Castle in Kitanakagusuku, which was abandoned during its construction as the result of several deaths both on- and off-site and still stands as it was; most Okinawan people will not go near the hotel.

Places are determined to be haunted if people in contact with the areas encounter severe misfortunes. In this case, a yuta, or several yuta, are usually contracted to contact the offended spirit and determine both how the offending individual can recompensate for their trespass, and whether or not the spirit can be brought to terms with the aims of the individual for the spirit's area. Though the spirit can almost always be pacified, it many times cannot accept the disturbance of its space, and thus the area is marked by the community as forbidden territory for development or travel. A yuta, a Buddhist monk, or a Shinto priest may be called upon to banish the spirit.

=== Magical creatures ===
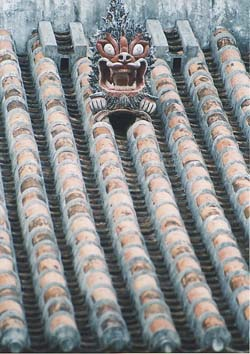
A shisa statue placed on a roof.

The kijimunaa (or bunagaya) is one of the most famous magical creatures. A sprite (Japanese yōsei), the kijimunaa resembles a short young boy and features bright red hair. They look somewhat like a Troll doll. Some say that only children or the pure of heart can see the kijimunaa. They may or may not be seen accompanied by fire. They live in the tops of curtain fig trees (がじゅまる); they are especially famous in the Yomitan area, where their images can be seen in many places. Kijimunaa are known for playing harmless pranks. Kijimunaa can also be helpful, but they are quick to change their minds. They enjoy fishing and eating fish. The only thing they fear is the octopus. Belief in kijimunaa is representative of the spiritual power of trees in the Ryukyu belief system.

Another of the most famous Ryukyuan creatures is the shisa 'lion dog'. Shisa statuary is used for its ability to ward off evil from a place.

Representative of the power of the sea are dragons, who often make appearances in Ryukyuan legend. In the Irosetsuden, for instance, dragons display powers like those of gods, and live in their own undersea kingdom. The traditional Ryukyuan conception of the dragon is largely similar to that of the Dragon King, though myths concerning an undersea kingdom of powerful reptilian beings are common to Central and East Asian cultures (see reptilian humanoids in mythology).

== Mabui ==
Mabui (眩い) is a key concept in Ryukyuan religion. Mabui is the essence of the self, somewhat like the soul and somewhat like mana. Just as the soul in many traditions is immortal, so is mabui; also like the soul, one's mabui is one's defining characteristic, unique to the individual. The mabui of a dead person may cling to a living person, requiring a ritual of separation (mabui-wakashi) or a conveyance from the place of death to a proper resting place (suukaa). In a case of sudden death, an especially complicated ritual takes place in order to separate the mabui from where it is clinging (as though it still lived) and move it to where it can find rest.

Like mana, mabui is transferable by contact: if a person leaves their grandmother's wedding ring, that ring, as a result, often in contact only with the grandmother, will have taken on the mabui of the grandmother. One's likeness, whether rendered in a photograph or in any other medium, also contains one's mabui. Due to their young age, the mabui of children is not as attached to their physical body as that of older people.

Mabui can leave the body, resulting in mabui-utushi (まぶいうとぅし, "lost mabui") with various physical results. The 2002 Okinawan film Hotel Hibiscus portrays many traditional Ryukyuan beliefs, among them the belief in the loss of mabui. In the film, a young girl named Meiko loses her mabui after a fight with her father and a peaceful encounter with the ghost of her dead aunt. She becomes unresponsive, only coming out of her trance-like state to talk again with her dead aunt.

Mabui can be lost as a result of fright, stress, loneliness, or helplessness, any circumstances in which a person suffers from a sudden shock or a lack of psychological/physical resources. A coma-like trance is one manifestation of the loss of mabui, but an extreme one. It seems that the loss of one's mabui manifests itself first psychologically, as depression or anxiety, and then physically as general lethargy or actual illness. Poor relationships – be they with the living, the dead, or incorporeal powers – also may result in the loss of mabui.

Two rituals are performed in relation to mabui: mabui-gumi if one has lost their mabui, and uchatou-mintou to stave off mabui loss. All prayers are offered aloud.

=== Mabui-gumi ===
This is performed as the result of the loss (or potential loss) of mabui. After being startled – e.g. due to a fright, or even a sneeze – one recites Mabuya, mabuya, utikuyou, or simply Mabuya, mabuya. One can also regain one's lost mabui simply by doing what one habitually does: sitting in one's favourite chair, sleeping in one's own bed, wearing favourite old clothing, or handling familiar, personal objects. More formally, a special ceremony can be performed by the family's matriarch at the place of the supposed loss of the mabui. First, prayers are offered to ancestors and household gods at home, and then the site of the supposed loss is visited. A fruit offering, an incense offering, and prayers of thanks are all addressed to ancestors. Then three stones from the place are tied up in clothing worn during the loss, and the matriarch returns home to make an offering of the three stones and a special meal of rice balls to the ancestors.

If the case is especially serious, a yuta 'shaman' may be involved in the retrieval of one's mabui.

=== Uchatou-mintou ===
This daily ritual prevents loss of mabui and possession by foreign spirits, or kakaimun. It involves a morning offering of water and tea to household gods, along with prayers for a safe and easy day. In the evening, prayers are offered that describe the good works and characteristics of all family members. Incense is usually offered as well.

== Kaminchu ==
Kaminchu (神人, かみんちゅ, "god people") are people specializing in Ryukyuan magico-religious practices, usually those involving incorporeal beings. Their social roles correspond to those of a shaman in that, depending upon their classification, they serve as mediums, especially influential prayer and offering performers, healers/guardians, precognosticators/fortune-tellers/diviners, and sources of mediation both within the living community and between material and immaterial beings. Although they may assist in the transference of the mabui of the deceased, they do not act as psychopomps, because they do not help guide a spirit out of this world and into the afterlife.

In the Okinawan language, shiji means the ability to sense, communicate with, and direct the power of ancestral gods. Although men may display some of these abilities and often assist in rituals, women are the primary interlocutors between humans and spirits or gods in the Ryukyuan religion, therefore are highly respected.

=== Noro/Nuuru priestesses ===
The noro or nuuru priestesses are the oldest kaminchu in the Ryukyu Islands. They communicate with, make offerings to, and, at times, channel ancestors, local gods and more powerful deities. Their primary duty is to officiate at communitywide (that is, "official") festivals and rituals. These rituals take place in a sacred space, usually in a grove (or ong), at a cave or by the sea. Men were forbidden to enter these sacred spaces (v.s. for more information concerning community worship). Another of their primary functions was the protection and fueling of the communal fire, which was used to establish new households.

The noro would also perform divination to determine the best days for sacred ceremonies, social functions such as marriage or funerals, and agricultural pursuits. Land was set aside for the use of the noro, who, when local, was called niigami and was the sister of the nitchu, the head of the oldest (or, later, most powerful) family in the community (called niiya). The noro was expected to remain a virgin. She was aided in her sacerdotal duties by a girl from every household in the community. The symbols of the noro are her white vestments and beads, often including a sacred, comma-shaped stone, the magatama.

On smaller islands, idiosyncratic noro traditions persist. On Kudaka, for instance, people believe in a "priesthood of all women", and all women serve the gods from age 31 to age 70. Their initiations, the Izaiho, were held every twelve years, and women were initiated between the ages of 31 and 40. Due to the absence of women of the representing age, the last Izaiho was held in 1978.

According to George Kerr in his Okinawa: the History of an Island People, the noro was once a priestess-queen, wielding both political and spiritual power within her community. Chinese records of the Northern Wei dynasty described the political power of the noro in much the same way Caesar described that of the Druids: their control over spiritual powers was used to wield judicial and martial authority over men. One noro, Pimeku, even attempted to forge a kingdom of independent islands. The Ryukyu Islands are described as queen islands in the Nihon Shoki as well. Gradually, however, the noro's role as ritual leader and religious consultant became independent of her role as political leader, perhaps as the result of sharing more and more power with her male relatives in order to deal with an increasing demand for her ritual services.

The noro became more priestess than queen, though they still possessed some measure of political influence, as they eventually came to wield royally sanctioned religious authority through appointments first begun by the Ryūkyūan king Shō Shin. These appointments were primarily from powerful local families to serve at their sacred sites throughout the main island of Okinawa; this system of appointment also served Miyako Island and the Yaeyama Islands. The system was an attempt to bring under royal control the autonomous centers of power that were the noro priestesses. The association of the noro with political power persisted even until the late 19th century in the outer islands.

Noro today can be seen on Okinawa at many festivals, most notably in Shioya in Ogimi Village and Iheya during the Ungami/Unjami festivals of July (Lunar Calendar).

=== Yuta ===
Yuta (sanjinsou, "tremblers"; Yonaguni munuchi, "one who knows"; Miyako kamigakaryaa, "one who acts as a home for the gods") are individuals who claim to possess an especially strong ability to communicate with the dead. The name "yuta" was originally pejorative, derived from tokiyuta, or "one who deceived"; indeed, since the establishment of a united Ryūkyū Kingdom, their practices have been discouraged and repressed. They are employed in response to psychic disturbance or the possibility thereof.

Whereas the noro is the official spiritual guide of the whole community, the yuta deals personally with families and individual paying clients to determine what spiritual circumstances have brought about or will bring about good or ill. They also see, channel, and communicate with the spirits of the dead in order to find out what is necessary to establish harmony in the lives of their clients. Because of this ability to interact with ancestors and solve daily problems, the yuta is probably the most influential of the kaminchu today, someone to be respected and somewhat feared. The yuta ability to channel the spirits of the recently dead, kuchiyose or migusou, is especially painful to her; however, this is one of their most common activities, as it is messages from and needs of the most recently dead that are often of greatest concern.

95% of yuta are women, according to Matayoshi and Trafton in their book, Ancestors Worship. They use rituals, dream analysis, and knowledge of case history in combination with contact with spirits. They often provide counsel, solving intra-family problems that may be generations old by talking with family members – both living and dead – to find the roots of issues. These issues can range from a child's poor school performance due to lack of parental attention to an individual's substance use being the psychological result of the neglect of certain ancestors. Yuta also possess the ability to call and banish spirits, and thus are employed in cases of clinging or angry spirits ("hauntings" or "curses"). Many may possess the power to predict disasters such as earthquakes and typhoons, or may display other powers, such as healing or divining the location of wells or lost/stolen objects.

Yuta receive their calling through the experience of mental and physical conditions known as kami-daari. The typical disorders of kami-daari include a variety ailments from loss of appetite to hematemesis.

While experiencing the symptoms of kami-daari, the soon-to-be yuta visits an usagiya, sanjinsou, or a practicing yuta to confirm that their symptoms are truly kami-daari. If she is confirmed to be experiencing kami-daari, she begins her journey to priestesshood. However, not all of those who experience kami-daari seek help from local shamans or priestesses. If she does not seek priestesshood and perform her ritual duties, it is thought that she will never be freed from her sufferings caused by kami-daari, become insane, as well as call misfortunes to her family and self.

The abilities to interact with the dead and solve family problems are discovered or developed through this trauma. Problems may also arise through the rejection of the call to be a yuta; these are called tatari ("punishments"), the period of suffering during which a yuta discovers the spirits which have called her into service. Yuta may emphasize various Buddhist beliefs, such as that of not being able to call forth those spirits who have obtained Buddhahood.

In Religion and Folklore of Okinawa, Kanhan Teruya divides yuta into various categories. Three are yuta dealing with spirits from the "Present Age" (v.s.), those dealing with ancestors who died in the "Middle Age", and those dealing with gods and Ultimate Ancestors. Some yuta are gamu mawari senmon, or those concerned with the use of caves. Some only arbitrate or advise. Also, yuta tend to either perform rituals anytime they are needed, or use only the Chinese zodiac days of the Tiger or Ox.

=== Others ===
Other classes of people wielding spiritual power in the Ryukyu Islands include the ukuri, or family priest/priestess; the usagiyaa, a prayer specialist aiding in the disorders of kami-daari (though lacking the power of the yuta or noro); and "book people" (shimuchi), various kinds of fortune-tellers that usually refer to charts and published interpretations of signs. Yuta and shimuchi may keep a suumun, a special box in which their fortune-telling guides are kept. Somewhat less important are Buddhist and Shinto clergy, who are generally only consulted for weddings, funerals, or on certain holidays associated with those religions (such as solar New Year activities). In the case of weddings, even Christian clergy may be called upon to officiate. Viewing of or participation in rituals may be forbidden to outsiders.

== Ijun ==
Ijun is an Okinawan New Religion that was founded in 1972 by Takayasu Rokuro. The Ijun religion has established churches on the islands of Okinawa, Miyako, Honshu, Taiwan, and Hawaii with an estimated ten thousand followers. The main deity of Ijun is called Kinmanmon. This deity communicated with Takayasu as a voice and identified itself as the primary deity of the universe, establishing all other deities as manifestations of Kinmanmon.

=== Gender dynamics ===
Like other Ryukyuan religions, Ijun began as a religion focused on female-centered leadership within the church. However, in 1989, it was decided that these role were more suited for men. By 1992, men had completely replaced women in their leadership roles, and women were placed in subordinate roles: maintaining the hearth, child rearing, etc. Takayasu explained that there are a few reasons for this: the church would not prosper if it did not adhere to the male-dominant society; Ijun might seem like a “women’s only” club, as a majority of the members and leaders were women; and childbearing would prevent women from performing their ritual duties. The Ijun branch on the island of Hawaii (est. 1989) is dominated by female leaders, forgoing the stringent, male-dominant practices of all other branches. The leaders of the Ijun church explain that this is appropriate because the female deity Pele is considered the Hawaiian incarnation of Kinmanmon. Takayasu stated that he sees this gender segregation within the church as necessary, but does not intend for it to last forever. He has also expressed a want to create co-gender ritual leading teams.

== Rise and Decline of Catholicism ==
The 1950s saw a rise in Catholic missionary activity in the Ryukyuan islands, resulting in a high conversion rate amongst the Ryukyuan people. The ratio of conversion to Catholicism in the Ryukyuan islands became the highest among the Japanese Prefectures at the time. This was made possible by the blending of existing Ryukyuan religious practices and Christian themes.

Recently, Catholicism has seen a decline in influence within the islands in response to growing competition with New Religions.

== Religious calendar ==
Most Ryukyuan festivals, observances and rituals are held on dates decided by the Chinese lunar calendar. Festivals common to Japan, like Obon, are held, along with those that are uniquely Ryukyuan.

== Ryukyuan mythos ==
=== Nirai Kanai ===
Nirai Kanai is the land of the gods, somewhat analogous to Heaven, and the place from which all life originates. It is worshipped facing eastward, as it is fabled to be somewhere in the Pacific Ocean. Gods from Nirai Kanai are said to have brought different crops and tools to the Ryukyuan people at different times. The Chinese characters "儀来河内" were historically used for their phonetics, but nowadays the name is rendered in katakana.

=== Ryukyuan creation myth ===
According to Chūzan Seikan, the Heavenly Emperor (天帝), who lived in the Heavenly Gusuku (天城), ordered Amamikyu (阿摩美久) to create the Ryukyu Islands. She descended to Earth on the spot of Sefa-utaki, and later built Tamagusuku Castle and Chinen Castle. Without sexual intercourse, she became pregnant by Shinerikyu, her male counterpart, and populated the islands. Some generations later, a "heavenly grandchild" named Tentei was born, who split Ryukyuan society into five classes with his three sons and two daughters: the first son was Tenson, who became the first King of Ryukyu; the second son became the first Aji; the third son became the first farmer; the first daughter became the first royal noro priestess; and the second daughter became the first village noro priestess.

=== Folk creation myths ===
Alongside the court mythology recorded in the Chūzan Seikan, a distinct body of folk creation myths circulates across Amami, Okinawa, Miyako, and Yaeyama, showing significant local variation. Many of these accounts describe the islands' origin through sibling creation rather than a deity descending from heaven, and several are connected to flood narratives. In some versions, the first child born is deformed. According to the Ryūkyūkoku yurai-ki, Amamiku brought the seeds of rice from Nirai Kanai, a version reflected in numerous folk traditions; in others, a bird carries the seeds from the other world and drops them into this one, giving rise to a giant named Amanchu who separated heaven and earth.

=== Equivalents to kami ===
One of the main equivalents to kami on Okinawa are spirits referred to in English as kang or kan, although they are often portrayed and seen as differently than kami in Shinto. Many are almost always depicted as more human-like than spirits on the Japanese mainland.

The kang have played an important role for traditional religious practitioners in Okinawa for centuries.

The ting nu kang (heavenly kang) are held by some worshippers to be the most powerful, but given the widespread disinterest in older mythology and traditions in Okinawa, this is often disregarded.

== Contemporary practice ==
During the Meiji period, as with the Ainu people of Hokkaido, the Ryukyuan people had their own culture, religion, traditions and language suppressed by the Meiji government in the face of forced assimilation (see Ryukyuan people § Meiji period).

In 1972, Okinawa was introduced to modern psychological practice. The psychological world initially rejected shamanism, but the increase in pro-Okinawan mentality among the people prompted a coexistence between the practices in society. Although shamans and doctors work to separate their practices from each other, Okinawan citizens utilize both services to find a central ground between spiritual and scientific realms.

== Objects of power ==
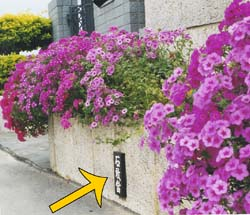
Ishigantō stone tablet

Various objects of power exist for Ryukyuan people; amulets are called munnukimun. Some of the most commonly seen are those purchased at Shinto shrines, such as charms for luck and safety. Others are of indigenous Ryukyu significance.

- Sangwaa (susuki, or knotted grass). According to legend, an old fisherman in northern Okinawa returned home one night with a big bag of fish. He cooked his supper, but ghosts appeared and put their hands all in his food; when he began to eat it, he had terrible diarrhea. This happened night after night until he created a san or sangwaa, twisted pieces of grass tied into a knot in the middle. The ghosts would not touch the food protected by this item, and he could enjoy his food in peace. Even today, this object can be seen employed in various ways as a ward against evil or, in the case of offerings, food rot.
- Ishiganto are talismanic stone tablets that are strategically placed in certain locations to ward off evil or unwanted spirits. They are almost always rectangular with the characters 石敢當 inscribed vertically. In rare cases, the rectangular stone is placed horizontally along with the inscription as well. The origin derived from China where they were most commonly placed at four-way intersections, T-intersections, and dead-end roads. These spirits are believed to only be able to move in a straight line or along roads. Legend gives the original purpose of it was to keep out evil spirits since they supposedly were unable to negotiate the turn. Houses positioned at the end of roads or corners of intersections will most likely have an ishiganto there to stop these spirits from walking straight into a house. Many houses will still have an ishiganto even if they are not located on a T-intersection or four-way intersection. In Okinawa houses traditionally have a low wall surrounding the entire property approximately the height of a man's chest to protect it from the prevalent typhoon winds and to give general security. The entrance to the house additionally had another small wall called a "himpun" to prevent people from looking directly into the establishment. The break in the low wall to enter the property near the entrance to the house is where the ishiganto would traditionally be placed.

The origins of this custom are not clearly pinpointed in history however; ishiganto dating back to the year 770 in China have been discovered during the reign of the Emperor of the Tang Dynasty. Based on this information it is generally accepted that the practice of using ishiganto spread throughout China during the late eighth century. The best guestimate researchers today have is the ishiganto was introduced to the Ryukyu kingdom during the middle of the fifteenth century. It then later spread to Japan at the end of the sixteenth century all the way north as far as Aomori, Akita, and Hokkaido.

Ishiganto are extremely prevalent in the Ryukyu archipelago. The largest number of these stone tablets are located on the main island of Okinawa. Generally, older traditional ishiganto in Okinawa are placed 20–30 centimeters off the ground. This is done to ward off evil spirits that enter the area by crawling on the ground. Presently, it is not uncommon to see an ishiganto embedded in the middle to upper part of a wall. Kikai-jima (island) is known to have a triangular-like font that is very comparable to a Japanese chess game called shogi. Today, ishiganto are still being made and are in demand. There are stone companies in Okinawa that still make traditional ishiganto. Other versions of these tablets are sold online in a much cheaper fashion and are generally mass-produced.

A description of talismans from the source cited above:

- The guardian shisa. Lion-dog wards. Described above and in their article.
- Mulberry branches are often used during August to ward off evil.
- Akufugeshi are made from conch shells and hung near cattle to ward away evil influences.
- Suijigai are made from spider conchs and hung to ward away evil.
- Shakogai are made from giant clams and placed near walls and at corners to ward away evil influences. One can see them on Miyagi, Ikei, and Tsuken Islands.
- Gen is twisted grass hung from the corner of a house to ward away evil.

Salt is often placed at corners and in doorways to ward away evil.

== See also ==
- Anito
- Chinese folk religion
- Chinese ritual mastery traditions
- Folk religion
- Fulu
- Gusuku Sites and Related Properties of the Kingdom of Ryukyu
- History of the Ryukyu Islands
- Indigenous Philippine shrines and sacred grounds
- Kami
- Racism in Japan
- Ryukyuans
- Shen (Chinese folk religion)
- Shigandang

== Works cited ==
- Kerr, George H. (2000). Okinawa: the History of an Island People. Boston, MA, U.S.: Tuttle Publishing. ISBN 978-0-8048-2087-5.
- Matayoshi, Masaharu; Trafton, Joyce (2000). Ancestors Worship: Okinawa's Indigenous Belief System. Toronto, Canada: University of Toronto Press. ISBN 978-0-9701798-0-7.
- Sered, Susan (1999). Women of the Sacred Groves: Divine Priestesses of Okinawa. New York: Oxford University Press. ISBN 978-0-19-512487-3.

== Selected bibliography ==
- Masaaki Nagata, trans. by Katsue Hyatt. Okinawan Folk Stories. A collection of Uchinanchu folk tales.
- Manabu Ooshiro, trans. by Marie Yamazato. Eisaa. Yui Publishing Co. for Okinawa Department of Culture and Environment, Cultural and International Affairs Bureau, Culture Promotion Division, Naha City, 1998.
- trans. by Sally Ooshiro. Irōsetsuden (遺老説伝). Presented as thesis towards completion of M.A., University of Hawaii, 1964. Along with the Omoro Sōshi, it is one of the collections of Ryukyu history and legend. Compiled in the 17th century by Shuri scholars.
- Legends of Okinawa by Sesoku Chizue. First publication, Okinawa, 1969. Hard-to-find collection of legends and folk tales.
- The Ghosts of Okinawa by Jayne Hitchcock. MHS Printing, April, 2000. ISBN 978-4-9900359-5-2. A short collection of ghost stories from around Okinawa. More information available at the author's website.
- Ouwehand, C. (1985). Hateruma: socio-religious aspects of a South-Ryukyuan island culture. Leiden: E.J. Brill. ISBN 978-90-04-07710-2
