= Onarigami =

Ancient belief of the Ryukyuan religion

Onarigami (おなり神; also written as をなり神) is the ancient belief of the Ryūkyūan people that spiritual power is the domain of women. The roles of women in Okinawan society and the ritual traditions of the Ryūkyūan religion are related to this belief. Women with exceptionally high spiritual power are called kaminchu (神人) and many have specific jobs in society. Though the role of priestesses has changed over time, they are still celebrated in Okinawa today.

== Ryukyuan religion ==
Ryukyuan religion is the indigenous belief system of the Ryūkyū Islands. It is largely based on ancestor veneration and concerned with relationships with the supernatural world. It is similar to Shinto but is also influenced by Polynesian religious beliefs and practices.

== History ==
Over time, Ryūkyūan religious practice has been influenced by Chinese religions, Buddhism, and Shinto.

=== Ryūkyū Kingdom ===
In the late fifteenth century, King Shō Shin established a formal hierarchy of religious officials that corresponded closely to the hierarchy of male government officials. He appointed his sister as the high priestess, known as the kikoe-ōgimi. By the sixteenth century, the traditional Ryūkyūan beliefs were part of a well-structured state religion in the Ryūkyūan Kingdom. The hierarchy of priestesses were an important factor in keeping the Ryūkyūan Kingdom unified. The royal authority of kings was closely interwoven with the power of female religious officials to confer spiritual power (seji or shiji) (Smits, 55). However, the king was not originally a large part in most important rites of the state. His role was passive compared to the Buddhist monks, high priestess and other leading female religious officials (Smits, 101).

=== Satsuma domination (1609–1871) and Confucianism ===
Near the end of the sixteenth century, the Shimazu clan of Satsuma invaded the Ryūkyūan Kingdom with the approval of the Japanese rulers in Edo. As many of Satsuma's elite viewed the Ryūkyūans as culturally inferior, a number of contemporary politicians attempted to reform the kingdom in order to be more acceptable to both the Japanese rulers and to China. During this time, it is thought that the brother-sister relationship became more important than ties to wives and mothers largely as a result of the influence of state formation and the introduction of a patrilineal form of kinship.

Satsuma slowly attempted to strip power from women. In 1611, the Fifteen Articles Decree included an article that stated women were no longer eligible for state offices. Links between the court and the outlying islands that had been affected by state priestesses were transferred into the male sphere. In 1667, regional priestess had to be represented by a male official instead of being able to travel to Shuri themselves for important occasions. By 1768, they could no longer receive gifts from the king in local offices, but had to instead deliver them to their homes. The king became the major actor in rites of state, and supplanted the nūru as the central link with “Heaven.” New Ryūkyūan rites prevented women from participating in key roles.

Many of these changes were met with the resistance of the Ryūkyūan people. Shō Shōken initially gained little support from other officials in taking steps against yuta. Confucianism never became popular with the common people, and traditional religious practices continued in the countryside. It is likely that the royal government had more control over the lives of peasants near major urban areas of Okinawa. Critical voices of the government in this time included the female poet Onna Nabe, whose writings indicated a strong personal connection to onarigami. The failure of the formal prohibition against yuta was acknowledged by government, but the government's stated ideals would not permit repealing it. Gregory Smits writes that this exemplified the “widening gap between an increasingly Confucianized central government and a peasantry that continued steadfast in its traditional religious beliefs and practices - with local officials caught in the middle,” (116).

=== Okinawa Prefecture, 1879–1945 ===
In 1879, the Ryūkyū Domain was renamed Okinawa Prefecture by the Meiji government and the monarchy was abolished. The land reforms of 1903 made land property of patrilineally organized families, which deprived village priestesses of their income, and, incidentally, some of their influence. However, they still retained some power, especially in out-of-the way places.

=== After World War II ===
The huge loss of life in World War II affected Ryūkyūan religion. There were no longer as many women available for spiritual positions, and the number of priestesses diminished dramatically. Other women were drawn away from the traditional religion by Christian and Buddhist missionaries. In terms of the government, the trends that began under Satsuma rule were continued through American occupation and Japanese rule.

== Onarigami and the family ==
=== Okinawan kinship ===
One of the key features of the Okinawan society is an ambilineal kin group called weka. This kin group consists of the couple and their produced offspring as well as the first and second cousins. For women, the status of these kinship group remains with her from when she was born to her death, which is different than kinship in the rest of Japan. Marriage does not replace a woman's original family but instead adds a new lineage. Women have a double membership with her biological family and her husband's family. The wife is accepted in the husband's kin group when she becomes a mother. If the mother marries someone of different clan outside of the group, she is able to return to her ancestral land for all rituals.

=== Matriarchal interpretations ===
While some of the earliest accounts of the Ryukyuan people by Westerners suggested that it was a matriarchal society, there has not been sufficient evidence to support this. However, supporters of the goddess hypothesis and matriarchal studies scholars such as Heide Göttner-Abendroth still view ancient Okinawa as matriarchal. Göttner-Abendroth cites onarigami as evidence that the “ancient Japanese matriarchal culture” came from the south (147).

=== Women ===
According to the Omoro Sōshi, Shiji is sought from the other world in the skies or over the sea (Monica, 346). This enables women to protect the kind men, and men at war. In addition to the high status of being a wife, there is also the sister-brother alliances. All of the women of the Ryukyu islands were worshipped by their brothers as onarigami. When the brother is away at sea they always take pieces of hair from his sister's head, it holds a fundamental value of priestesses and goddesses in which the sister possessed to ensure protection of the voyage. The women in the Okinawan society are thought to have the power to bless or curse a male's kin. Although they practice a patrilineal descent, the women in the household still have the spiritual power as practiced by the onarigami. The roles of these women in the household are to maintain the family structure as well as continuing on the ritual, such as praying on ancestral shrine. It is usually the eldest women in the household which oftentimes are the wife or mother that performed the ritual. Whereas the monthly rituals performed within the agrarian cycle are from the sisters of the household. These duties are to be fulfilled until death and then the roles are transferred to the next available female of the household (Monica, 353).

== Kaminchu ==
In Ryūkyūan religion, a kaminchu is a person with spiritual power (seji), the ability to sense, communicate with, and direct the power of kami. They also have obligations to kami. According to W.P. Lebra, a person is appointed kaminchu once it is clear that the person has spirit of high value. Additionally, these people typically come from families of already established kaminchu and are usually the first son or first daughter of that family. Although both men and women can have spiritual power, most kaminchu are women, in accordance with the onarigami emphasis on women's spiritual superiority. Kaminchu can be further broken down into other religious specialist subgroups, specifically nūru and yuta.

=== Noro priestesses ===
Noro (or Nūru in the Okinawan language) refers to a chief priestess of a community. They are widely thought of as the embodiment of a particular kami and therefore hold a semi-divine status. Noro are thought, in old Ryukyu, to communicate directly with “Heaven” and that heaven communicated through her (Smits, 101). The noro are government officials and possibly could have helped in tax collection in some localities and were in charge of officiating all ceremonial affairs in the community (Smits, 115). Additionally, the noro may also be in charge of officiating ceremonial affairs in neighboring villages. Noro are, however, mainly in charge of garnering the favor of kami. These priestesses exclusively wear white kimono as a sign of their close relationship with kami, and no other villagers are allowed to wear this color kimono. The role was largely confined to women from certain families, and was passed on from generation to generation with the paraphernalia of sacred objects (Newman and Eng, 396). According to Newman and Eng, at one time noro were required to be celibate. However, these days, it is not a stringent requirement as some noro priestesses are married. Still, these married priestesses choose to abstain from sexual relationships with their husbands during the time of important events and rituals.

=== Yuta ===
Yuta, female shamans or mediums, are kaminchu with the ability to see, hear, and be possessed by kami or spirits. Because of this, they are called upon when any mysterious or unfortunate events arise and are asked to provide the cause for such events. Yuta are not thought of as being the embodiment of a particular kami or spirit as they are ones who can see and communicate with all kami and spirits. With regards to kami and spirits, yuta are able to do spirit mediumship, curing, exorcism, prayer, retrocognition or discerning past events, prayer, and other rituals. As with nuru, yuta are chosen by kami. However, they will have no prior knowledge of their position as yuta before the kami sends them signs of their position. Also like the nuru, yuta are more often than not women. There are some male yuta but they are not particularly trusted. This further places emphasis on the role of women in the community. Outside of the Ryukyuan islands, there has been a negative perception of all yuta. Some American scholars have interpreted them as being malevolent magical practitioners or compared them to fortune tellers, and Japanese administrators even outlawed their operations at one point. The cause of this, in part, stemmed from the yuta undermining the authority of the nuru. However, this prohibition proved to be unsuccessful as most common people that had supported yuta before prior to the prohibition continued to support them after.

== Religious activities ==
=== Festivals ===
Agricultural festivals in which the onarigami play a significant role are widespread throughout the Ryūkyū Islands. The Tanetori Festival on Taketomi Island, for example, "centers on the sowing of seeds and prayers for their growth," rituals which are performed by onarigami.

== Contemporary interpretations of onarigami ==
The religion is kept alive in varying degrees depending on the village and its inhabitants. Monica Wacker suggests in her article on onarigami that the nuru, niigan, and chikasa will continue to fulfill their religious duties, and that particularly colorful festivals like the Tanetori Festival will survive even if more serious aspects of the religion die out. Towards the end of the last century, there has been a revival of sorts of the idea of onarigami and its relation to the identity of women in Okinawa. Many modern women are deeply immersed in traditional religious activities. They know about their important historical roles as important religious figures and that through this, early Ryukyuan women were involved in the politics of men. Of note is the Unai Festival that has developed recently. The power of Unai has been used for political gains today, including electing a female representative into the city council of Naha in 1987.

== See also ==
- Ethnic issues in Japan
- Folk religion
- History of Ryukyu Islands
- Ryukyuans
