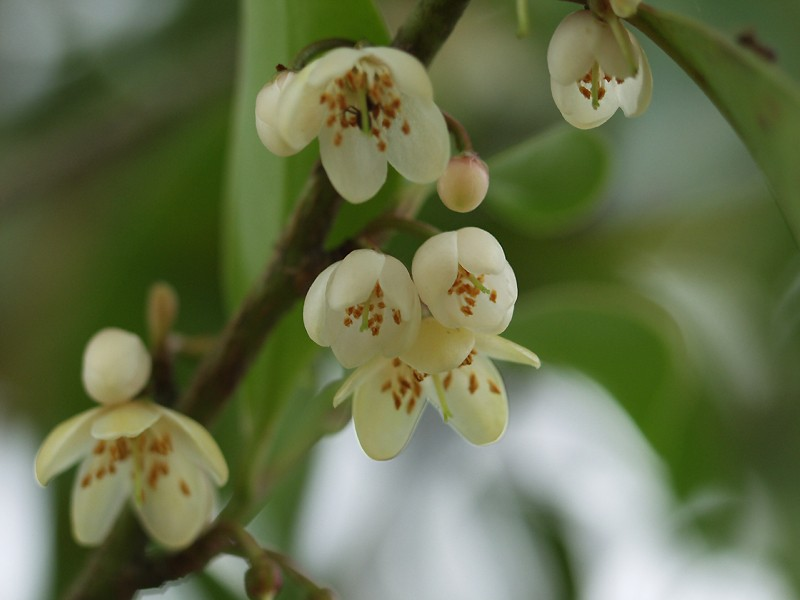
- Sakaki, Cleyera japonica

Conservation status
- Least Concern (IUCN 3.1)

Scientific classification
- Kingdom: Plantae
- Clade: Tracheophytes
- Clade: Angiosperms
- Clade: Eudicots
- Clade: Asterids
- Order: Ericales
- Family: Pentaphylacaceae
- Genus: Cleyera
- Species: C. japonica

Binomial name
- Cleyera japonica Thunb.

= Cleyera japonica =

Sakaki

Species of tree

Cleyera japonica (sakaki) is a flowering evergreen tree native to warm areas of Japan, Taiwan, China, Myanmar, Nepal, and northern India (Min and Bartholomew 2015). It can reach a height of 10 m (33 ft). The leaves are 6–10 cm (2.4–3.9 in) long, smooth, oval, leathery, shiny and dark green above, yellowish-green below, with deep furrows for the leaf stem. The bark is dark reddish brown and smooth. The small, scented, cream-white flowers open in early summer, and are followed later by berries which start red and turn black when ripe. Sakaki is one of the common trees in the second layer of the evergreen oak forests. It is considered sacred to Japanese Shintō faith, and is one of the classical offerings at Shintō shrines including tamagushi and masakaki.

== Uses ==
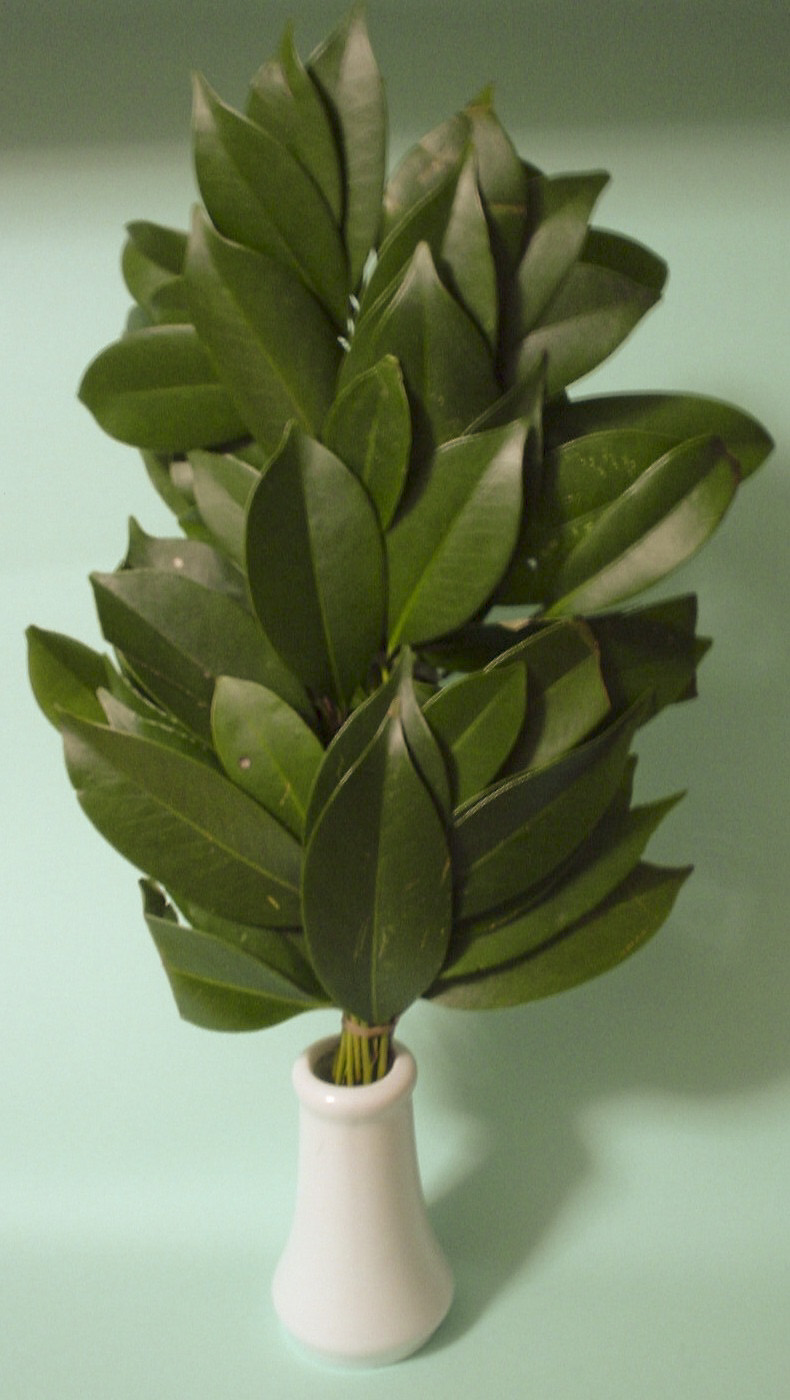
Wands of Sakaki are used in Shinto ritual.

Sakaki wood is used for making utensils (especially combs), building materials, and fuel. It is commonly planted in gardens, parks, and shrines.

Sakaki is considered a sacred tree in the Shinto religion, along with other evergreens such as hinoki (檜, Japanese cypress) and kansugi (神杉, "sacred cryptomeria"). Shinto shrines are traditionally encircled with shinboku (神木, "sacred trees") constituting a himorogi (神籬, "divine fence"). In Shinto ritual offerings to the "gods; spirits" (神, kami), branches of sakaki are decorated with paper streamers (shide) to make tamagushi.

Originally, the term sakaki referred broadly to all evergreen trees before narrowing to designate this species specifically. When sakaki was unavailable, other evergreens such as oak, cryptomeria, boxwood, or fir could be used as substitutes. Beyond decoration and purification, sakaki branches also served as torimono, hand-held ritual objects carried by miko during sacred dances. A passage in the Nihon Shoki similarly recounts Emperor Keikō addressing the sakaki of Mount Shitsu, decorated in a manner comparable to the sakaki of the Amaterasu myth. In the myth about Amaterasu and the cave she hid in, after Susanoo's tantrum, when the Yata no Kagami was forged and propped-up in front of Amaterasu's cave, it was said to have been perched-upon the branches of a sacred, 500-branched Sakaki tree facing the cave.

== Linguistic background ==
The Japanese word sakaki is written with the kanji character 榊, which combines 木 (ki, "tree; wood") and 神 (kami, "spirit; god") to form the meaning "sacred tree; divine tree". The lexicographer Michael Carr notes:

In modern Japanese, sakaki is written 榊 with a doubly exceptional logograph. It is an ideograph (in the proper sense of 'logograph representing an idea' rather than loosely 'Chinese character; logograph') and is a kokuji 国字 'Japanese [not Chinese] logograph.' Ideograms and kokuji are two of the rarest logographic types, each constituting a small percentage of a typical written Japanese sample. First, the idea of sakaki is expressed with a melding of boku or ki 木 'tree' and shin or kami 神 'god; divine, sacred' [of Shinto 神道]; comparable to a graphic fusion of the word shinboku 神木 'sacred tree.' Second, the sakaki 榊 ideograph is a kokuji 'national [i.e., Japanese] logograph' rather than a usual kanji 漢字 'Chinese logograph' borrowing. Kokuji often denote Japanese plants and animals not native to China, and thus not normally written with Chinese logographs. (1995:11)

The kanji 榊 first appears in the (12th-century) Konjaku Monogatarishū, but two 8th-century transcriptions of the word sakaki are 賢木, meaning "sage tree" (Kojiki, tr. Chamberlain 1981:64 "pulling up by pulling its roots a true cleyera japonica with five hundred [branches] from the Heavenly Mount Kagu"), and 坂木, meaning "slope tree" (Nihon Shoki, tr. Aston 1896:42–43, "True Sakaki tree of the Heavenly Mt. Kagu"). Sakaki (賢木 or 榊) is the title of Chapter 10 in The Tale of Genji (c. 1021). It comes from this context.

"May I at least come up to the veranda?" he asked, starting up the stairs. The evening moon burst forth and the figure she saw in its light was handsome beyond describing. Not wishing to apologize for all the weeks of neglect, he pushed a branch of the sacred tree in under the blinds. "With heart unchanging as this evergreen, This sacred tree, I enter the sacred gate." She replied: "You err with your sacred tree and sacred gate. No beckoning cedars stand before my house." And he: "Thinking to find you here with the holy maidens, I followed the scent of the leaf of the sacred tree." Though the scene did not encourage familiarity, he made bold to lean inside the blinds. (tr. Seidensticker 1976:187)

The etymology of the pronunciation sakaki is uncertain. With linguistic consensus that the -ki suffix denotes 木 ("tree"), the two most probable etymologies are either sakae-ki ("evergreen tree"), from sakae (栄え, "flourishing; luxuriant; prosperous"); or saka-ki ("boundary tree"), from saka (境, "boundary; border") – an older form of modern reading sakai, from the way that trees were often planted at a shrine's boundary line. Carr (1995:13) cites Japanese tradition and historical phonology to support the latter etymon. The Shogakukan Kokugo Dai Jiten Dictionary entry for this term also notes that the pitch accent for sakayu (栄ゆ) – the origin of modern sakae (栄え) – is different than what would be expected, suggesting that saka-ki (境木, "boundary tree") may be the more likely derivation (Shogakukan 1988).
