= Kameyama Yoshiharu =

Japanese samurai

- 龜山 嘉治

Personal details
- Born: Unknown Nakatsugawa, Owari Domain, Mino Province, Japan
- Died: March 1, 1865 Tsuruga Domain, Echizen Province, Japan
- Cause of death: Decapitation

Kameyama Yoshiharu (龜山 嘉治; died 1865) was a Japanese samurai of the late Edo period. He was a student of the Hirata school of kokugaku.

== Biography ==
Kameyama Yoshiharu was born to a relatively affluent family in Nakatsugawa, a town under the jurisdiction of the Owari Domain. Little is known of Kameyama's early life. At some point, he developed an interest in classical studies and joined the burgeoning kokugaku movement.

Kameyama collaborated with fellow kokugaku scholar Ichioka Shigemasa in the local publication of Hirata Atsutane's treatise on supernatural phenomena "A New Theory on Ghosts and Spirits" (鬼神新論, Kishin shinron). The two carved the printing blocks by hand out of Japanese cherry wood blanks. In 1864, he joined the forces of the Tengutō under the leadership of Takeda Kōunsai and Yamakuni Hyōbu. Within the Tengutō, Kameyama was assigned to duties as a logistics officer overseeing the warriors' luggage and personal cargo (小荷駄奉行, konida bugyō). After the Battle of Wada Pass, Kameyama was entrusted with the severed head of 17-year-old Yokota Mototsuna, who killed himself after being mortally wounded by an arquebus bullet. Kameyama turned over Yokota Mototsuna's head to Ichioka Shigemasa and Hazama Hidenori, the two of whom later discreetly buried it in the Hazama family cemetery to prevent it from being captured by Shogunate headhunters for identification, a practice known as kubi-jikken. After the Tengutō warriors were finally captured in the lands of the Tsuruga Domain, Kameyama was executed along with nearly all the others. Some accounts allege that Tanuma Okitaka, commander of the intercepting forces, deceived the rebels by promising leniency and a stay of execution if they surrendered.

== Legacy ==
In his 1929 epic historical novel Before the Dawn, Shimazaki Tōson records a poem presented by Kameyama to the family of his father Shimazaki Masaki, another kokugaku student and close friend of Ichioka Shigemasa:

あられなす矢玉の中は越えくれどすすみかねたる駒の山麓ふみわくる深山紅葉を敷島のやまとにしきと見る人もがも八束穂のしげる飯田の畔にさへ君に仕ふる道はありけりみだれ世のうき世の中にまじらなく山家は人の住みよからまし草まくら夜ふす猪の床とはに宿りさだめぬ身にもあるかなつはものに数ならぬ身も神にます我が大君の御楯ともがな木曾山の八岳ふみこえ君がへに草むす屍ゆかむとぞおもふ

—Kameyama Yoshiharu (1864)
Translation:

Though we passed through a hail of arrows and bullets, we could not advance beyond the highlands of Koma. Instead, we — who beheld in the mountain fastnesses autumn leaves red as the Yamato brocades of Shikishima — carved out a path to service through the valleys of Iida, where ripe ears of grain shine. How good it must be to dwell deep in these mountains, untouched by the troubles of this world. We who have no home in this world must make our grass-pillows with the wild boars. May brave men more numerous than the spirits themselves serve as shields for our divine lord! We who came over the endless peaks of the Kiso Mountains will become bones in the grass beside our lord.

—Translation
