= Before the Dawn (novel) =

1929 novel by Tōson Shimazaki

- First English edition
- Author: Tōson Shimazaki
- Original title: Yoakemae (夜明け前)
- Translator: William E. Naff
- Language: Japanese
- Publisher: University of Hawaiʻi Press (English)
- Publication date: 1929 (serial), 1932 and 1935 (novel)
- Publication place: Japan
- English publication date: April 1987

Before the Dawn (夜明け前, Yoakemae) is a historical novel by the Japanese writer Tōson Shimazaki. It was originally published in Chūō Kōron in 1929 as a serial work. Shinchosha later published the work in novel form, with the first part being released in January 1932 and the second part being released in November 1935.

Regarded in Japan as the definitive novel of the period it portrays, it tells about the fall of the Tokugawa shogunate, an event precipitated by the arrival of Commodore Perry's Black Ships, and the early years of the Meiji Restoration.

It begins with the famous line "The entire Kisoji is in the mountains" (木曾路はすべて山の中である Kisoji wa subete yama no naka de aru). The Kisoji ran through Shimazaki's hometown in Gifu Prefecture, Japan. Before the Dawn became Shimazaki's most popular novel.

== Plot ==
The focus is on the rural mountain village of Magome-juku lying across the highway between Tokyo and Kyoto, which was used by the Tokugawa shogunate as a posting station or shukuba (宿場) in Japanese. Following a character modeled closely after Tōson's own father Shimazaki Masaki, the novel carries its story through the turbulent decades before and after the fall of the Tokugawa shogunate sparked by the arrival of Commodore Perry's ships in 1853. The protagonist Aoyama Hanzō, a devout follower of Hirata Atsutane's idealistic nativism but tied down by his duties as the head of Magome-juku, observes the tide of events leading to the opening and Westernization of Japan.

In the years after the Japanese Civil War of 1868, the Hirata movement achieves its initial goals and becomes superficially incorporated into the new bureaucracy, but deteriorates into political impotence and is gradually expelled by the progressive-minded leadership. Hanzō, fearing that Japan's native values and way of life will be discarded and forgotten by future generations enamored by things Western, is driven insane by despair and ultimately dies after being imprisoned by his own family.

== List of characters ==
Historical characters mentioned or appearing in the story include the following. Fictionalized names used in the story are included in parentheses.

- Shimazaki Masaki (Aoyama Hanzō)
- Shimazaki Shigeaki (Aoyama Kichizaemon)
- Shimazaki Sono (Aoyama Kume)
- Shimazaki Tōson (Aoyama Wasuke)
- Shimazaki Shigeyoshi (Aoyama Juheiji)
- Tsunoda Tadayuki (Kureta Masaka)
- Hazama Hidenori (Hachiya Kozō)
- Ichioka Shigemasa (Asami Keizō)
- Majima Sei'an (Miyagawa Kansai)
- Kurimoto Jō'un (Kitamura Zuiken)
- Yamakuni Hyōbu
- Takeda Kōunsai
- Kameyama Yoshiharu
- Shiohara Hikoshichi
- Yajima Denzaemon
- Kitahara Inao
- Iwasaki Nagayo
- Tokugawa Yoshikatsu
- Matsudaira Yorinori
- Itagaki Taisuke
- Itō Hirobumi
- Shimazu Hisamitsu
- Charles L. Richardson
- Makino Narisada
- Engelbert Kaempfer
- Hasegawa Tetsunoshin
- Fuijmoto Tesseki
- Ikemura Kuninori (Iseya Kyūbei)
- Sagara Sōzō
- Yoshida Shōin
- Saigō Takamori
- Higashikuze Michitomi
- Oguri Kozukenosuke
- Katsu Kaishū
- Yamaoka Tesshū
- Townsend Harris
- Léon Roches
- Mermet de Cachon
- Princess Kazu
- Nakae Chōmin
- Matthew C. Perry
- Tokugawa Iemochi
- Tokugawa Yoshinobu
- Emperor Meiji
- Emperor Kōmei
- Maki Yasuomi
- Matsuo Tase
- Iwase Tadanari
- Tokugawa Nariaki
- Etō Shinpei
- Sanjō Sanetomi
- Harry S. Parkes
- William Keswick
- Kanagaki Robun
- Takano Chōei
- Umeda Unpin
- Kusaka Genzui
- Kirino Toshiaki
- Tanaka Ōhide
- Matsudaira Katamori
- Ii Naosuke
- Gotō Shōjirō
- Iwakura Tomomi
- Motoori Norinaga
- Hirata Atsutane
- Hirata Kanetane
- Hirata Nobutane
- Robert B. Van Valkenburgh
- Richard V. Boyle
- Edmund Morel
- Hashimoto Gahō

== Reception ==
In their review of the novel, Publishers Weekly said that "the author's supreme achievement is to dramatize wrenching social and political change at the level of individual response" and that what made the story so readable is the "viable link between event and character, coupled with Toson's limpid, low-key style".

== Adaptations ==
Before the Dawn was adapted into a film of the same name released in 1953, with a screenplay by Kaneto Shindō and directed by Kōzaburō Yoshimura (吉村 公三郎 Yoshimura Kōzaburō). It was also later adapted into a play by the American playwright Joseph Stein.

== Translation ==
Before the Dawn was translated into English by William E. Naff and published by University of Hawaiʻi Press in April 1987 (798 pages, ISBN 0-8248-0914-9). Naff's translation won the Japan–U.S. Friendship Commission Prize for the Translation of Japanese Literature in 1987.

== See also ==
- Buddenbrooks by Thomas Mann, the German novel described by the translator William E. Naff as the closest European analogue to Before the Dawn - another historical story similarly depicting the downfall of an ancient family after the feudal society to which it belonged disappeared in the 19th century
