= Shimazaki Masaki =

19th-century Japanese scholar of Hirata kokugaku

- 島崎 正樹
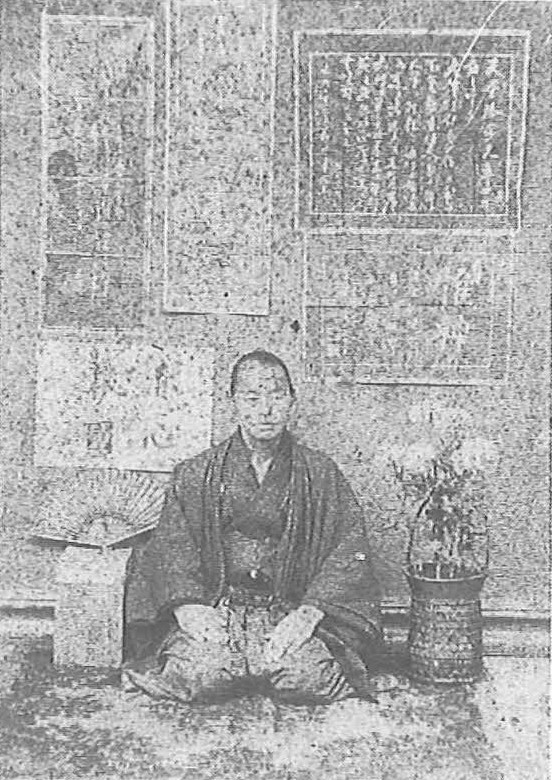

Honjin, Toiya, and Shōya of Magome Station

Personal details
- Born: Shimazaki Kanatarō (島崎 鍛名太郎); June 13, 1831 Magome Station, Mino Province, Japan
- Died: November 29, 1886 (aged 55) Misaka Village, Nagano Prefecture, Japan (today Nakatsugawa, Gifu Prefecture)
- Spouse: Shimazaki Nui (島崎ぬい)
- Children: Shimazaki Tōson; Shimazaki Sono; Shimazaki Tomoya
- Writing career
- Pen name: Shōsui'en Seiga (松翠園静雅); San'en (粲園)
- Notable works: Pine Boughs (松か枝, Matsukae)

Shimazaki Masaki (島崎 正樹; 1834–1886) was a Japanese gōnō, honjin master, student of kokugaku, and Shinto priest. He was the father of Shimazaki Tōson. He primarily wrote under the name of Aratamanoya (璞堂), but later in life also adopted the names Shizunoya (静舎; transl. "house of serenity") and finally Kanzanrō (観山楼). His courtesy name was Sachio (禎夫), and he was referred to by relatives as Kichizaemon (吉左衛門), the family's hereditary name.

== Biography ==
Shimazaki Masaki was born under the apotropaic name Kanatarō to Shimazaki Kichizaemon Shigeaki (島崎 吉左衛門 重韶), hereditary chief of the Magome relay station in the Kiso Valley. The young Masaki taught himself to read and write with great difficulty using the few books available in the village, often outdated and poorly copied manuscripts, in both Japanese and Classical Chinese.

After an introduction by Hazama Hidenori of Nakatsugawa, Masaki became an exceptionally dedicated disciple of the nativist Shintō theology of Motoori Norinaga and Hirata Atsutane under the tutelage of Majima Sei'an, a student of the samurai-scholar Aoyama Kagemichi of Naegi Domain, the first Hirata disciple in the region. The theory of Hirata Atsutane, a fundamentalist, that the importation of foreign ideas like Buddhism in ancient times had corrupted a pristine, theocratic Japanese nation powerfully influenced Masaki for the rest of his life. Alongside the other Hirata disciples of Mino and Naegi, Masaki was involved in the promotion of traditional Shintō funeral practices in opposition to the officially mandated Buddhist alternative. During this time he also became acquainted with Matsuo Taseko and Tsunoda Tadayuki.

In 1864, after having assumed leadership of the station from his father, the Tengutō passed through Magome. A poem left by Kameyama Yoshiharu at this time later came into Masaki's possession. Though he wanted to travel to Kyoto to assist the other Hirata disciples in their agitation there, he stayed in Magome due to a sense of responsibility to his family and the people of the village. He remained in Magome throughout the Boshin War, and on more than one occasion arranged lodging for the revolutionary Imperial Army.

In 1874, having retired and passed financial authority to his eldest son, he travelled to Tokyo and secured employment within the Historiography Division (考証課) of the Department of Religion (教部省), the temporary successor to the older Department of Divinities. However, he soon left disillusioned with his coworkers flippant attitude toward and lack of dedication to Shinto. That same year, he inscribed a poem on a folding hand fan in which he expressed his fear that Japan's cultural values and national identity would be either forgotten or discarded by a cosmopolitan population with an uncritical admiration for Western culture:

If the crab's burrowing is not stopped, the high levee will not last long
蟹の穴ふせぎとめずは高堤やがてくゆべき時なからめや

At the time of a public cavalcade by the Emperor Meiji, Masaki threw the fan into what he believed to be the carriage of the emperor's outriders in the hope that the message would come to the emperor's attention. He was arrested immediately charged with the crime of impiety, but was not penalized beyond a minor fine due to the court's assessment of the motivations for his act. He later became aware that the fan had in fact landed in the carriage of the emperor himself.

In 1875, as part of the government's expulsion of Hirata influence, Masaki was rusticated by the Department of Religion to the remote Minashi Shrine to serve as a resident priest. He remained at Minashi for four years, and became known to locals for bursting into tears while conducting lectures on legendary national history. According to Shimazaki Tōson, it was during this time that Masaki came to greatly respect Tanaka Ōhide, the foremost kokugaku scholar of the Hida Mountains.

Masaki returned home in 1880. Not long after, during a personal inspection of the Hokuriku region by the Emperor, he was reprimanded for attempting to present a petition to the Emperor's entourage regarding what he saw as the slighting of native culture by progressive and secularist national policies. At this time Masaki began to experience nightmares and hallucinations.

Following repeated personal setbacks, difficulty with alcoholism, and alienation from family and neighbors, Masaki was ultimately driven insane by despair. After attempting to burn down the local Eishōji (永昌寺) temple, he was imprisoned by his family in a wooden cage behind the house. Thereafter he became increasingly deranged while his health rapidly declined due to starvation, hypothermia, and exposure to his own feces and urine. By late 1886 he had died from beriberi induced heart failure. Contrary to his wishes, he was buried in the Buddhist cemetery of the Eishōji.

== Quotes ==
Who is it who says the American dollar is the equal of Japanese silver? Who is it who would have bad dollars and good silver stand equal in the balance without considering how cheap we are when we sell our nation? Will it make us rich if we sell ourselves at a good price, heaping up dollars like mountains of dirt? How cruel it is to convert into dollars the labors of the people of the kami! We must question the power of the dollar throughout Ōyashima. This age of fools! We know these dollars are inferior, but we do not heed what we know. If the nation's treasures are exhausted, though we've heaped up dollars like mountains, what will we buy?

— Shimazaki Masaki (1860)

Of all the things to which heaven and earth have given rise, mankind is the most wondrous and most holy. It is possible for mankind to be wondrous and holy because mankind has the wondrous and holy lodged in its heart. There are innumerable varieties of things in the world. In the fields there are thousands of grasses and herbs, and in the mountains there are tens of thousands of trees. One can take in all these grasses and trees at a glance, but among herbs the chrysanthemums and the orchids have fine scents, and among trees the pine and the oak possess nobility.

So it is with mankind. There are those who can surpass the general run because they are superior in spirit to the general run. The commonplace, however numerous, are all the same; they are like the grasses and trees that possess neither scent nor nobility. Those who excel, one if there be only one, ten if there be ten, are all serviceable and profitable to the nation. Among herbs and trees they have the qualities of the chrysanthemum and the pine. But with chrysanthemum and pine, one glance tells you of their glory. The brilliance or stupidity of a human mind is not reflected in its physical housing, and for that reason one cannot readily recognize its quality.

In the mind it is one's thoughts that comprise the wondrous and holy. He who is most enlightened in his soul thinks the farthest ahead; the fool does not dare to do so at all. Now, the human mind cannot refrain from thinking. Our thoughts flourish in our breasts. We enumerate them, we line them up, and by bringing them to maturity, we actualize them. Our insignificant bodies merely guard this undertaking, as looking upward we serve our parents, and looking downward we nurture our wives and children. Thus we are enabled to act. Why should we flatter the world or seek to enter into it? It is by being born as they do and by dying as they do that the souls of all things realize themselves.

The way in which we may observe the ancients is through what they have said in their writings and through what they achieved in their valor. Those who preserved their sense of justice and honesty, those who remained loyal and steadfast throughout, those who admonished the throne though they died for it - it is through their example that we may observe antiquity. It is through those who remained apart in order to discipline themselves; it is through those who persevered in the face of danger even to the point of death; it is through those who made wise plans and succeeded, as well as through those who, when they saw that their heroic designs were untenable, were able to revise them. It is through those who, even after a hundred generations of sound rule, were still wracked with concern for the nation. It is through those who have told us how everything may yet be lost in one disastrous reversal. Our models are taken from those who ended violence and suppressed disorder, gaining the respect and submission of all around them. It is through those who recorded hundreds of generations in their histories in order to transmit them to the future.

Thus it is with all things. Thus it is that nothing can be realized by a single person. But will I then be able to live in accordance with what I love?

— Shimazaki Masaki (1864)

A man who cannot endure the agony he bears in his heart for his country's fate is called crazy. Isn't that a very sad thing? Those unable to see the truth are already doomed.

— Shimazaki Masaki (1886)

== See also ==
- Malinchism
- Before the Dawn (novel)

== Notes ==
1.This name literally translates to "house of the unpolished gem". However, the syllables that comprise it could also be rendered in kanji form as「荒霊舎」or "house of the turbulent spirit" or "house of the wild spirit". The double meaning is believed to have been intentional.
2.As pointed out by Tōson, the "American" dollars Masaki mentions were actually metallurgically inferior Mexican or Hong Kong trade dollars. Furthermore, the debased foreign coins were mainly being used to buy not Japanese silver but high-purity gold ryō specie — to the dismay of Japanese who believed in the importance of maintaining strategic reserves of precious metals.
