= Reach Beyond the Blue Sky =

2021 taiga drama about Shibusawa Eiichi

- Promotional poster
- Written by: Mika Ōmori
- Directed by: Hiroshi Kurosaki and others
- Starring: Ryo Yoshizawa; Kengo Kora; Ai Hashimoto; Tsuyoshi Kusanagi; Seiichi Tanabe; Shinnosuke Mitsushima; Show Kasamatsu; Yuko Oshima; Yūki Izumisawa; Dean Fujioka; Ikusaburo Yamazaki; Hayato Isomura; Hanamaru Hakata; Kanji Ishimaru; Kōji Ōkura; Naoto Takenaka; Yoshino Kimura; Emi Wakui; Issey Ogata; Kin'ya Kitaōji; Nakamura Shikan VIII; Shinichi Tsutsumi; Kaoru Kobayashi
- Narrated by: Nami Morimoto
- Theme music composer: Naoki Satō
- Country of origin: Japan
- Original language: Japanese
- No. of episodes: 41

Production
- Producer: Maiko Itagaki
- Running time: 45 minutes

Original release
- Network: NHK
- Release: February 14, 2021

Reach Beyond the Blue Sky (青天を衝け; Seiten o Tsuke) is a Japanese historical drama television series starring Ryo Yoshizawa as Shibusawa Eiichi, a Japanese industrialist widely known today as the "father of Japanese capitalism". The series is the 60th NHK taiga drama, premiered on February 14, 2021.

== Cast ==
=== People of Chiaraijima village ===
==== Shibusawa family ====
- Ryo Yoshizawa as Shibusawa Eiichi (also known as Eijirō, Eiichirō, Tokudayū, Tokutarō)
  - Masahito Kobayashi as young Eiichi
- Kaoru Kobayashi as Shibusawa Ichirōemon, Eiichi's father
- Emi Wakui as Shibusawa Ei, Eiichi's mother
- Eri Murakawa as Shibusawa Naka, Eiichi's older sister
  - Nanoha Oda as young Naka
- Ryōko Fujino as Shibusawa Tei, Eiichi's younger sister
  - Honoka Yoshida as young Tei
- Kengo Kora as Shibusawa Kisaku (later known as Shibusawa Seiichirō), Eiichi's cousin
  - Shūto Ishikawa as young Kisaku
- Riko Narumi as Shibusawa Yoshi, Kisaku's wife
- Sei Hiraizumi as Shibusawa Sōsuke, Eiichi's uncle
- Mayumi Asaka as Shibusawa Masa, Eiichi's aunt
- Rina Ono as Shibusawa Uta, Eiichi's daughter
  - Chisato Yamasaki as young Uta
- Sawa Nimura as Ōuchi Kuni
- Yūki Izumisawa as Shibusawa Tokuji
- Show Kasamatsu as Shibusawa Keizo
- Kentarō Tamura as Hozumi Nobushige
- Kenta Uchino as Sakatani Yoshirō
- Akana Ikeda as Shibusawa Kotoko
- Yuko Oshima as Itō Kaneko, Eiichi's second wife
- Yūki Yagi as Shibusawa Fumiko

==== Odaka family ====
- Seiichi Tanabe as Odaka Junchū, Chiyo's older brother
- Shinnosuke Mitsushima as Odaka Chōshichirō
  - Kōsei Sutō as young Chōshichirō
- Ai Hashimoto as Odaka Chiyo, Eiichi's first wife
  - Aiko Iwasaki as young Chiyo
- Kenshi Okada as Odaka Heikurō (later known as Shibusawa Heikurō), Eiichi's cousin
  - Haru Takagi as young Heikurō
- Satomi Tezuka as Odaka Yahe, Odaka family's mother
- Mai Tezuka as Odaka Kise, Junchū's wife
- Mei Hata as Odaka Yū, Junchū's daughter

=== Mito Domain ===
- Naoto Takenaka as Tokugawa Nariaki, Yoshinobu's father and the 9th Lord of Mito
- Hideko Hara as Yoshiko, Yoshinobu's mother
- Ayumu Nakajima as Tokugawa Yoshiatsu, Nariaki's eldest son and the 10th Lord of Mito
- Rihito Itagaki as Tokugawa Akitake, Yoshiatsu and Yoshinobu's half-brother
- Ikkei Watanabe as Fujita Tōko, Nariaki's confidant
- Kanji Tsuda as Takeda Kōunsai, Nariaki's confidant
- Kisetsu Fujiwara as Fujita Koshirō, Tōko's son

=== Hitotsubashi House ===
- Tsuyoshi Kusanagi as Tokugawa Yoshinobu, the last shogun
  - Motoi Kasamatsu as Shichirōmaro (young Yoshinobu)
- Shinichi Tsutsumi as Hiraoka Enshirō, Yoshinobu's confidant
- Yoshino Kimura as Hiraoka Yasu, Enshirō's wife
- Rie Mimura as Tokushin-in, Yoshinobu's grandmother
- Rina Kawaei as Mika-gimi (Ichijō Mikako), Yoshinobu's wife
- Toshiya Tōyama as Ikai Katsusaburō, Hitotsubashi House's side servant
- Kazuki Namioka as Kawamura Ejūrō, Enshirō's subordinate
- Kimihiko Hasegawa as Nakane Chōjūrō
- Minosuke as Kurokawa Kahei
- Hiroyuki Onoue as Hara Ichinoshin

=== Tokugawa shogunate ===
==== Tokugawa family ====
- Yoshi Ikuzō as Tokugawa Ieyoshi, the 12th shogun
- Daichi Watanabe (Kuroneko Chelsea) as Tokugawa Iesada, the 13th shogun
- Mone Kamishiraishi as Tenshō-in Atsuhime, Iesada's wife
- Rie Minemura as Utahashi, Iesada's nanny
- Hayato Isomura as Tokugawa Iemochi, the 14th shogun
- Mai Fukagawa as Princess Kazu, Iemochi's wife and Emperor Kōmei's younger half-sister

==== Rōjū ====
- Gorō Kishitani as Ii Naosuke, the tairō
- Ryohei Otani as Abe Masahiro, member of Shogun's Council of Elders
- Kenta Satoi as Hotta Masayoshi, member of Shogun's Council of Elders
- Hiroyuki Sase as Kuze Hirochika
- Ryūnosuke Karasawa as Naitō Nobuchika
- Rikiya Koyama as Sakai Tadashige
- Takeshi Matsumura as Mizuno Tadakiyo

==== Hatamoto ====
- Mitsuru Hirata as Kawaji Toshiakira, Chief Financial Official
- Yasuhi Nakamura as Nagai Naoyuki, Coastal Defense
- Satoru Kawaguchi as Iwase Tadanari

==== Shinsengumi ====
- Keita Machida as Hijikata Toshizō

==== Others ====
- Jun Shison as Sugiura Aizō
- Mansaku Ikeuchi as Kurimoto Joun
- Sō Yamanaka as Tanabe Taichi
- Akira Okamori as Mukōyama Kazufumi
- Yoshihiko Hosoda as Dr. Takamatsu Ryōun
- Atsuhiro Inukai as Fukuchi Gen'ichirō
- Shinji Takeda as Oguri Kozukenosuke (Tadamasa)
- Miou Tanaka as Tanuma Okitaka
- Hiroshi Yamamoto as Yamataka Nobuakira

=== Aizu and Kuwana Domains ===
- Seiichi Kohinata as Matsudaira Katamori
- Shunpei Kohinata as Matsudaira Sadaaki

=== Fukui Domain ===
- Jun Kaname as Matsudaira Yoshinaga, a.k.a. Matsudaira Shungaku, Fukui feudal lord
- Teppei Koike as Hashimoto Sanai, Fukui feudal warrior

=== Satsuma Domain ===
- Shin'ya Niiro as Shimazu Nariakira, 28th Head of the Shimazu clan
- Narushi Ikeda as Shimazu Hisamitsu, Lord of Satsuma Domain and the guardian of Shigehisa
- Hanamaru Hakata as Saigō Takamori
- Kanji Ishimaru as Ōkubo Toshimichi, Hisamitsu's confidant
- Yu Tokui as Orita Yōzō
- Dean Fujioka as Godai Tomoatsu
- Ryūnosuke Matsumura as Mishima Michitsune
- Joe Hyūga as Kawamura Sumiyoshi

=== The imperial court ===
- Onoe Ukon II as Emperor Kōmei, 121st Emperor of Japan
- Naoki Inukai as Emperor Meiji, 122nd Emperor of Japan
  - Suzuri Shibasaki as Prince Sachi
- Takaya Yamauchi as Iwakura Tomomi
- Yōhei Okuda as Prince Kuni Asahiko
- Yuta Kanai as Sanjō Sanetomi
- Keiichirō Mori as Nijō Nariyuki
- Mizuki Tsujimoto as Empress Eishō
- Ryōtarō Okiayu as Ōgimachisanjō Sanenaru
- Masami Horiuchi as Nakayama Tadayasu

=== Foreigners ===
- Morley Robertson as Matthew C. Perry, a commodore of the U.S. Navy
- Blake Crawford as Henry A. Adams
- Charles Glover as Townsend Harris
- Kyle Card as Ernest Mason Satow
- Ian Moore as Harry Parkes
- Alexandre Sagar as Alexander von Siebold
- Greg Dale as Paul Flury-Hérard
- Didier Carelock as Léon Roches
- Jeffrey Rowe as Charles de Montblanc
- Julien Jaulin as Napoleon III
- Marie Moilliet as Eugénie de Montijo
- Nozomi de Lencquesaing as Mermet de Cachon
- Arno Le Gall as Leopold II of Belgium
- Massimo Biondi as Paul Brunat
- Riccardo Balzarini as Alexander Allan Shand
- Frederic Benoliel as Ulysses S. Grant
- Michelle Take as Julia Grant
- Brent Olian as Jesse Grant
- Gaetano Totaro as Theodore Roosevelt
- Neil Garrison as William Howard Taft
- Dong Hao as Sun Yat-sen
- Ricky Anderson as Frank A. Vanderlip
- Jamie Schyy as George Eastman
- Don Johnson as Lyman J. Gage

=== The new government ===
- Ikusaburo Yamazaki as Itō Hirobumi
- Kōji Ōkura as Ōkuma Shigenobu
- Aki Asakura as Ōkuma Ayako, Shigenobu's wife
- Shūichirō Masuda as Etō Shinpei
- Masaki Miura as Maejima Hisoka
- Wataru Takagi as Tamano Yofumi
- Kaisei Kamimura as Akamatsu Noriyoshi
- Seiji Fukushi as Inoue Kaoru
- Reika Manaki as Inoue Takeko
- Ren Komai as Inoue Sueko
- Kazuaki Hankai as Komura Jutarō
- Reki Amada as Katō Takaaki
- Kenjirō Ishimaru as Hara Takashi
- Yoshimasa Kondo as Shidehara Kijūrō
- Yoshiyuki Ōmori as Katō Tomosaburō
- Masato Mitani as Tokugawa Iesato
- Tōsei Ishida as Kaneko Kentarō
- Kazunari Uryū as Soeda Juichi

=== Mitsubishi Group ===
- Nakamura Shikan VIII as Iwasaki Yatarō
- Shugo Oshinari as Iwasaki Yanosuke

=== Others ===
- Kin'ya Kitaōji as Tokugawa Ieyasu, the first shōgun of the Tokugawa shogunate, and the host of the series.
- Toru Watanabe as Umeda Shinnosuke, Armor dealer in Edo
- Hiroshi Tamaki as Takashima Shūhan, Western-style gunner
- Yoshi Sakō as Tone Yoshiharu, Okabe Domain magistrate
- Shunya Itabashi as Sanada Hannosuke, swordsman
- Ginnojō Yamazaki as Ōhashi Totsuan, Edo Confucian scholar
- Tetsu Watanabe as Kakubei
- Tomori Abe as Suma
- Shōdai Fukuyama as Kōno Kenzō
- Masataka Matsubara as Inokichi
- Hajime Yamazaki as Rōro Sakatani
- Daikichi Sugawara as Date Munenari, 8th Head of the Uwajima Domain
- Ryūshi Mizukami as Yamauchi Yōdō, 15th Head of the Tosa Domain
- Takuo Inari as Tokugawa Yoshikatsu, 14th Head of the Owari Domain
- Nakamura Mantarō as Fukuzawa Yukichi
- Issey Ogata as Minomura Rizaemon
- Junpei Yasui as Masuda Takashi
- Hisahiro Ogura as Ono Zen'emon
- Katsumi Kiba as Ōkubo Ichiō
- Yōji Tanaka as Hagiwara Shirobei
- Tadashi Ōtake as Hiraoka Junzō
- Ryūji Kasahara as Kijima Matabei
- Kumi Kureshiro as Masuda Eiko
- Takashi Okabe as Ōkura Kihachirō
- Rio Kanno as Ōkura Tokuko
- Kōki Osamura as Sasaki Yūnosuke
- Kanda Hakuzan VI as Kanda Hakuzan II
- Jiro Okamoto as Kijūrō
- Kōzō Haginoya as Kodama Gentarō
- Kazu Murakami as Dr. Takaki
- Hiro Ueno as Yasoda Meitarō
- Yūichi Yasoda as Kitasato Shibasaburō

== TV schedule ==
| Episode | Title | Directed by | Original airdate | Rating |
|---|---|---|---|---|
| 1 | "Eiichi, Mezameru" (栄一、目覚める) | Hiroshi Kurosaki | February 14, 2021 | 20.0% |
| 2 | "Eiichi, Odoru" (栄一、踊る) | Hiroshi Kurosaki | February 21, 2021 | 16.9% |
| 3 | "Eiichi, Shigoto-hajime" (栄一、仕事はじめ) | Hiroshi Kurosaki | February 28, 2021 | 16.7% |
| 4 | "Eiichi, Okoru" (栄一、怒る) | Naoki Murahashi | March 7, 2021 | 15.5% |
| 5 | "Eiichi, Yureru" (栄一、揺れる) | Naoki Murahashi | March 14, 2021 | 16.2% |
| 6 | "Eiichi, Munasawagi" (栄一、胸騒ぎ) | Hiroshi Kurosaki | March 21, 2021 | 15.5% |
| 7 | "Seiten no Eiichi" (青天の栄一) | Naoki Murahashi | March 28, 2021 | 14.2% |
| 8 | "Eiichi no Shūgen" (栄一の祝言) | Kensuke Matsuki | April 4, 2021 | 15.3% |
| 9 | "Eiichi to Sakuradamon-gai no Hen" (栄一と桜田門外の変) | Naoki Murahashi | April 11, 2021 | 14.5% |
| 10 | "Eiichi, Shishi ni Naru" (栄一、志士になる) | Kensuke Matsuki | April 18, 2021 | 13.9% |
| 11 | "Yokohama Yakiuchi Keikaku" (横濱焼き討ち計画) | Hiroshi Kurosaki | April 25, 2021 | 14.1% |
| 12 | "Eiichi no Tabidachi" (栄一の旅立ち) | Hiroshi Kurosaki | May 2, 2021 | 13.4% |
| 13 | "Eiichi, Kyō no Miyako e" (栄一、京の都へ) | Kenji Tanaka | May 9, 2021 | 13.9% |
| 14 | "Eiichi to Unmei no Shukun" (栄一と運命の主君) | Kenji Tanaka | May 16, 2021 | 15.5% |
| 15 | "Tokudayū, Satsuma Sennyū" (篤太夫、薩摩潜入) | Hideaki Kawano | May 23, 2021 | 15.3% |
| 16 | "Onjin Ansatsu" (恩人暗殺) | Naoki Murahashi | May 30, 2021 | 14.6% |
| 17 | "Tokudayū, Namida no Kikyō" (篤太夫、涙の帰京) | Kenji Tanaka | June 6, 2021 | 14.2% |
| 18 | "Hitotsubashi no Futokoro" (一橋の懐) | Hideaki Kawano | June 13, 2021 | 14.2% |
| 19 | "Kanjōkumigashira Shibusawa Tokudayū" (勘定組頭 渋沢篤太夫) | Yūto Osaki | June 20, 2021 | 13.6% |
| 20 | "Tokudayū, Seiten no Hekireki" (篤太夫、青天の霹靂) | Naoki Murahashi | June 27, 2021 | 14.6% |
| 21 | "Tokudayū, Tōki Michi e" (篤太夫、遠き道へ) | Hideaki Kawano | July 4, 2021 | 16.5% |
| 22 | "Tokudayū, Paris e" (篤太夫、パリへ) | Kenji Tanaka | July 11, 2021 | 14.7% |
| 23 | "Tokudayū to Saigo no Shōgun" (篤太夫と最後の将軍) | Kenji Tanaka | July 18, 2021 | 14.1% |
Three weeks off due to the Olympic Games broadcast.
| 24 | "Paris no Goisshin" (パリの御一新) | Kenji Tanaka | August 15, 2021 | 14.3% |
| 25 | "Tokudayū, Kikoku suru" (篤太夫、帰国する) | Hiroshi Kurosaki | August 22, 2021 | 12.0% |
Two weeks off due to the Paralympic Games broadcast.
| 26 | "Tokudayū, Saikai suru" (篤太夫、再会する) | Hiroshi Kurosaki | September 12, 2021 | 12.7% |
| 27 | "Tokudayū, Sunpu de Hagemu" (篤太夫、駿府で励む) | Naoki Murahashi | September 19, 2021 | 12.6% |
| 28 | "Tokudayū to Yaoyorozu no Kami" (篤太夫と八百万の神) | Hiroshi Kurosaki | September 26, 2021 | 13.8% |
| 29 | "Eiichi, Kaisei suru" (栄一、改正する) | Akihiro Tajima | October 3, 2021 | 13.1% |
| 30 | "Shibusawa Eiichi no Chichi" (渋沢栄一の父) | Hiroshi Kurosaki | October 10, 2021 | 13.0% |
| 31 | "Eiichi, Saigo no Henshin" (栄一、最後の変身) | Wataru Suzuki | October 17, 2021 | 14.0% |
| 32 | "Eiichi, Ginkō wo Tsukuru" (栄一、銀行を作る) | Naoki Murahashi | October 24, 2021 | 12.9% |
| 33 | "Rongo to Soroban" (論語と算盤) | Kenji Tanaka | October 31, 2021 | 11.9% |
| 34 | "Eiichi to Densetsu no Shōnin" (栄一と伝説の商人) | Hideaki Kawano | November 7, 2021 | 14.4% |
| 35 | "Eiichi, Motenasu" (栄一、もてなす) | Kenji Tanaka | November 14, 2021 | 12.9% |
| 36 | "Eiichi to Chiyo" (栄一と千代) | Hiroshi Kurosaki | November 21, 2021 | 12.2% |
| 37 | "Eiichi, Agaku" (栄一、あがく) | Wataru Suzuki | November 28, 2021 | 12.0% |
| 38 | "Eiichi no Chakunan" (栄一の嫡男) | Tetsuya Watanabe | December 5, 2021 | 12.6% |
| 39 | "Eiichi to Sensō" (栄一と戦争) | Naoki Murahashi | December 12, 2021 | 11.9% |
| 40 | "Eiichi, Umi wo Koete" (栄一、海を越えて) | Hiroshi Kurosaki | December 19, 2021 | 12.1% |
| 41 | "Seishun wa Tsuzuku" (青春はつづく) | Hiroshi Kurosaki | December 26, 2021 | 11.2% |
Average rating 14.1% - Rating is based on Japanese Video Research (Kantō region).

=== Omnibus ===
| Episode | Original airdate | Original airtime |
|---|---|---|
| 1 | January 3, 2022 | 8:15 - 9:10 |
| 2 | January 3, 2022 | 9:10 - 10:00 |
| 3 | January 3, 2022 | 10:05 - 10:59 |
| 4 | January 3, 2022 | 10:59 - 11:49 |
