= Kurimoto Jō'un =

Japanese hatamoto, physician, diplomat, philosopher and journalist

- 栗本 鋤雲
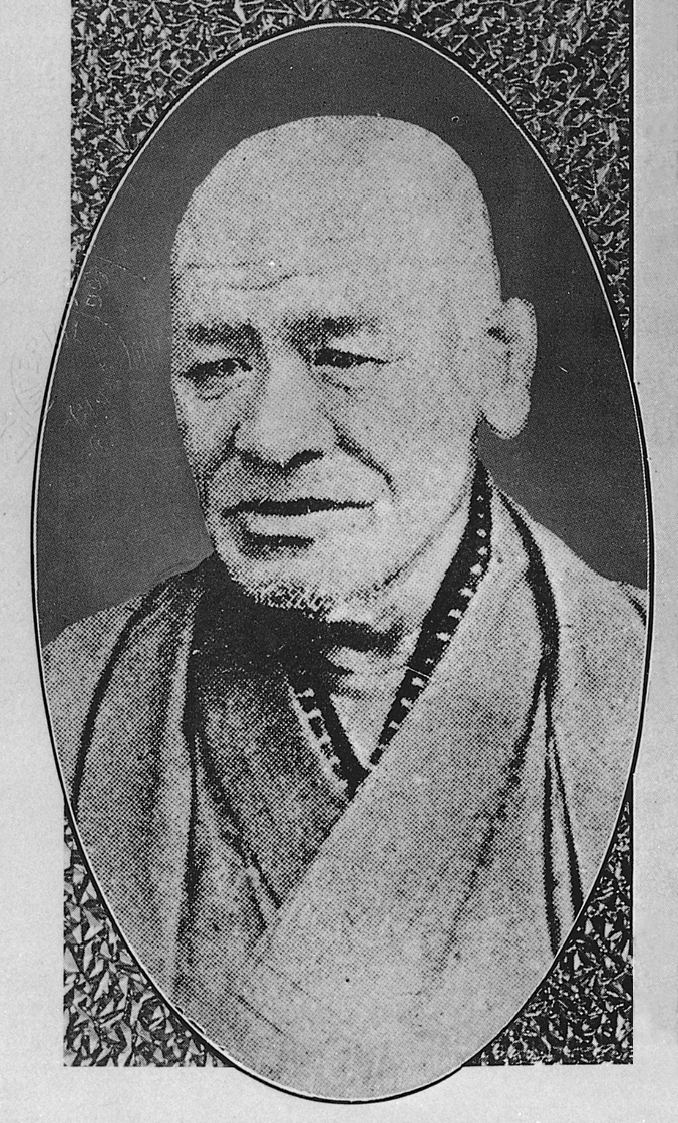
- Born: Kitamura Tetsuzō; 1 May 1822; Edo, Japan
- Died: 6 April 1897 (aged 74); Japan
- Occupations: hatamoto, physician, diplomat, philosopher, and journalist

Kurimoto Jō'un (栗本 鋤雲; 1 May 1822 – 6 April 1897), born Kitamura Tetsuzō (喜多村 哲三) was a Japanese hatamoto, physician, diplomat, philosopher, and journalist. He also used the name Sehee (瀬兵衛).

== Biography ==
Jō'un was born as the third son of Kitamura Kaien (喜多村 槐園), an official physician to the Shogunate. In his youth, he is known to have used the nickname Zuiken (瑞見). His elder brother, Kitamura Naohiro, was a prominent figure in the Shogunate's system of medical research institutes.

After preparatory study at the Kenzanrō (見山楼) academy run by the Cheng–Zhu scholar Asaka Gonsai, Jō'un enrolled as a student at the Yushima Seidō. He soon graduated with excellent grades.

In 1848, Jō'un succeeded into the Kurimoto family of physicians, and became a personal physician to the shogun. During that time, he also lectured on medicine.

In 1858, he was ordered to relocate to Ezo and settled in Hakodate, then a major outpost of the Matsumae clan. According to Shimazaki Tōson, the reason for this relegation was Jō'un earning the ire of Oka Rekisen-in, chief of the Shogunate medical staff, by trying to recruit test passengers for the newly built Kankō Maru.

In the following years, Jō'un devoted himself to the development of Hakodate. His contributions included the construction of the Hakodate Medical Center (箱館医学所, Hakodate igakujo) with an eye to the eradication of the syphilis endemic to local brothels, management of the Nanaemura Medicinal Herb Garden (七重村薬園), the dredging of the Kunebetsu River to open it for shipping to Hakodate, and the promotion of cattle husbandry. Jō'un was eventually promoted to head of the Hakodate bugyō, and conducted surveys of Japanese territory on Sakhalin and the Kuril Islands.

In 1863, Jō'un was recalled to Edo. As the Shogunate appreciated his achievements in Hakodate, he was promoted to the position of head of the Yushima Seidō's Shōheizaka Academy. Around that time Jō'un also became a metsuke and was involved in the planning of the Shogunate naval yards. Due to his having developed expertise in military technology, he was rapidly appointed to the post of gaikoku bugyō and then finally kanjō bugyō, offices he held concurrently with his responsibilities as Hakodate bugyō. By 1866, he had formed a close friendship with Oguri Kozukenosuke.

Jō'un became acquainted with Mermet de Cachon, the interpreter for Léon Roches, the French representative in Japan, during his time in Hakodate, and he had a good relationship with Roches as a result. Because of this, the Shogunate asked Jō'un to serve as a bridge between France and Japan. Jō'un was thus involved in preparation for the first French military mission to Japan.

Jō'un accompanied the delegation of Tokugawa Akitake which visited Paris for the 1867 World Exposition. During his stay in France, he worked on repairing Japanese-French relations, which had deteriorated due to the suspension of loans by France. He was also engaged in diplomatic negotiations with Britain and visited Léon de Rosny. There, he received news from foreign magistrate Kawakatsu Hiromichi of the return of temporal power to the young Emperor Meiji by Tokugawa Yoshinobu.

Jō'un returned to Japan on 24 June 1868. Jō'un's reputation for genius impressed the revolutionary Imperial government, and he was invited to serve in a new capacity within its fledgling bureaucracy. However, Jō'un refused the offer out of loyalty to the Shogunate, issued a formal apology, and went into seclusion.

At the suggestion of Kanagaki Robun, Jō'un joined the Yokohama Mainichi Shinbun (横浜毎日新聞) newspaper in 1872 as a journalist. In the following year, 1873, he became the chief editor of the mail-order newspaper Yūbin Hōchi Shinbun (郵便報知新聞) and contributed by bringing on students of Fukuzawa Yukichi as reporters.

Around 1894, the twenty-two-year-old Shimazaki Tōson often visited the retired Jō'un, who by that time had begun using the name Kon (鯤).

He died of bronchitis in 1897 at the age of 76.

== Legacy ==
Jō'un appears under the name Kitamura Zuiken (喜多村 瑞見) in Shimazaki Tōson's 1929 epic novel Before the Dawn.

== Quotes ==
Two great duties devolve upon parents, namely the rearing and the education of their children. The helplessness of an infant makes it absolutely dependent on its parents, and their care is willingly bestowed upon it. When of more mature years parents seek to secure for their children the blessings of education, so that they may grow up wise, happy and independent. All this is or should be a pleasure to parents. The making of a man is dependent on the education he receives when young; if carefully attended to, the youth becomes a good or wise man, but if neglected he becomes the reverse. It is thus clear that parents are equally bound to educate their children properly as to protect them when infants, and if they neglect either they fail in their duty as parents.

At the present time schools are established in every part of the Empire, which are readily available for those living within the district, so that the children of the highest and the lowest, the rich and the poor, can all read and write. Education is, indeed, widely spread throughout the country. But as regards the parents we find that they only consider themselves bound to maintain their children and protect them in infancy, and quite lose sight of the fact that they are responsible for their education, as the present state of affairs leads them to suppose that it is the duty of the state to educate their children, and that they themselves are relieved from any obligation in this respect. If their reasons for holding such opinions are inquired into, they disclaim personal responsibility because they are obliged by law to send their children to school, and it is therefore no concern of theirs whether the master is competent to teach, or if the children receive a sound education. This indifference on the part of the parents conduces to carelessness and idleness on the part of their children, so that the education offered them is too often thrown away.

For this reason, if we compare the present system of education with that in vogue during the Shogunate, we cannot but come to the conclusion that the result only shows retrogression. Under the Shogunate the extent of a child's education depended on the condition of his parents. The poor people placed their children under the instruction of either Shinto or Buddhist priests, while those who could afford it had their children instructed by competent masters at home, or sent them to good schools in the capital to study such special subjects as the bent of their minds or their capacity for learning showed was desirable. In short, at that time parents, high or low, rich or poor, fully recognized the duty incumbent on them of seeing that their offspring were properly educated, and their obligation to bear the cost of such themselves.

But at the present time, though the country has advanced in civilization and the people are intellectually improved, parents are gradually adopting the belief that the education of their children is the duty of the state, and the reason of this is that at present the cost of such education is borne by the Government, or is covered by local taxation which therefore but indirectly touches those who are naturally responsible.

In every country and in every age the want of education has been a curse, as thousands of illiterate persons, whose good qualities have not had an opportunity of development, are led through ignorance to lead dissolute lives, and perhaps eventually lapse into crime to the great injury of society. For this reason it is perhaps as much the duty of the Government to enforce education among the people as it is to establish police and law courts in order to secure peace and order in the country. Now parents may have conveniently adopted this view, without taking a higher one of their responsibility, and therefore in the long run, beneficial as Government instruction may appear to be, we imagine it is conducive of harm. If it is the duty of the state to educate the children, why should they not at once be sent to the poor-house and there maintained and educated, without causing any trouble and anxiety to their parents ? Yet no one would say that such a course would be right. Parents are naturally bound, if possible, to protect and maintain their offspring, and there is so close a connection between this duty and that of attending to their education, that the one can no more be set aside than the other, and the responsibility of the latter should not devolve on the Government. In Western countries parents are held responsible for the education of their children, and why should they not be so in this country?

Although much of the present improved condition of the country is due to our enlightened Government, still much more of it is due to the march of time. And if in the unenlightened times of the Shogunate parents recognized the necessity of properly educating their children, how much more will they recognize that necessity now if they are in no way relieved of their responsibility, especially as they really dislike the present system of forced education, are alive to the retrogressive result, and consequently place no reliance on the existing schools being able to effectually benefit their children. Even now there are parents who prefer to rely on private tuition as an addition to the instruction obtained at the public schools, and we are sure that benefit would result from education being left entirely to the free will of the parents. It would then be to the interest of parents to take care that the instructors of their children, whom they themselves would have to pay, were fully competent to perform the work they undertook, so that not only would the masters themselves be kept well up to their work, but the scholars under their care would receive wider and more exact instruction. Moreover, it would save a large outlay by the Government, which could be otherwise employed to the good of the country, and would encourage parents to faithfully perform the duties alloted [sic] to them by Nature.

— Kurimoto Jō'un, translated by Charles Lanman in 1883

== See also ==
- Takadaya Kahei
