= The Life of a Certain Woman =

1921 Japanese novella

- Author: Tōson Shimazaki
- Original title: ある女の生涯; Aru onna no shōgai
- Translator: William E. Naff
- Language: Japanese
- Publisher: Shinchō
- Publication date: 1921
- Publication place: Japan
- English publication date: 2007
- Media type: Print

The Life of a Certain Woman (Japanese: ある女の生涯, Hepburn: Aru onna no shōgai) is a biographical novella by Japanese writer Tōson Shimazaki first published in 1921. The story is an account of the last years of Shimazaki's oldest sister Sono Takase and her battle with mental disorder.

== Plot ==
After the death of her husband, Ogen, a woman of sixty, leaves the household of the Oyamas, her husband's family, together with her forty-year-old daughter Oshin, her little nephew and a serving woman. She first stays at the clinic of Dr. Hachiya, suffering from mental disorders believed to be inherited from her father, who had died in complete madness, and the aftereffects of a venereal disease which she caught from her promiscuous husband. In addition, she blames the same venereal disease for her daughter's intellectual disability. After her companions' return to the Oyamas, Ogen travels to Tokyo, where she moves between the flats of her younger brothers Naotsugu and Kumakichi, who try to talk her into getting medical treatment. She is first taken to a rest home in Koishikawa, where her condition decreases to the point of hallucinating. Eventually, she is transferred to the Negishi mental hospital, which she loathes. Three years later, she dies. At her wake, the absence of her brother Kumakichi is noted, which the eldest brother Shōta explains with the fact that he had gotten notice too late.

== Biographical background ==
In 1916, two years after her husband's death, Shimazaki's oldest sister Sono (Ogen in the novella) left the Takase household for a brief course of treatment at a nearby clinic, before joining her brothers Hirosuke (Naotsugu) and Tōson (Kumakichi) in Tokyo. When her family could no longer cope with her increasingly eccentric behaviour, she was first transferred to a rest home and later to a mental hospital, where she died in 1920, aged sixty-four. At the time of her death, Tōson Shimazaki and his family had been estranged due to the scandal surrounding the publication of his novel Shinsei. As a result, he received note of the death of his sister, the relative he felt closest to, too late and could not attend her wake.

Shimazaki had Sono appear as a character in one of his works before, under the name of Otane in his novel The Family (1910–1911).

== Publication history ==
The Life of a Certain Woman was first published in the July 1921 edition of Shinchō magazine. It has later been called one of Shimazaki's best known naturalistic stories and has been reprinted numerous times. A translation into English provided by William E. Naff appeared in 2007.

In 1970, The Life of a Certain Woman was included in the literary works sealed in a time capsule in Osaka Castle during the Expo '70, Japan.
