= Minashi Shrine =

Shinto shrine in Gifu Prefecture, Japan

Minashi Shrine 水無神社
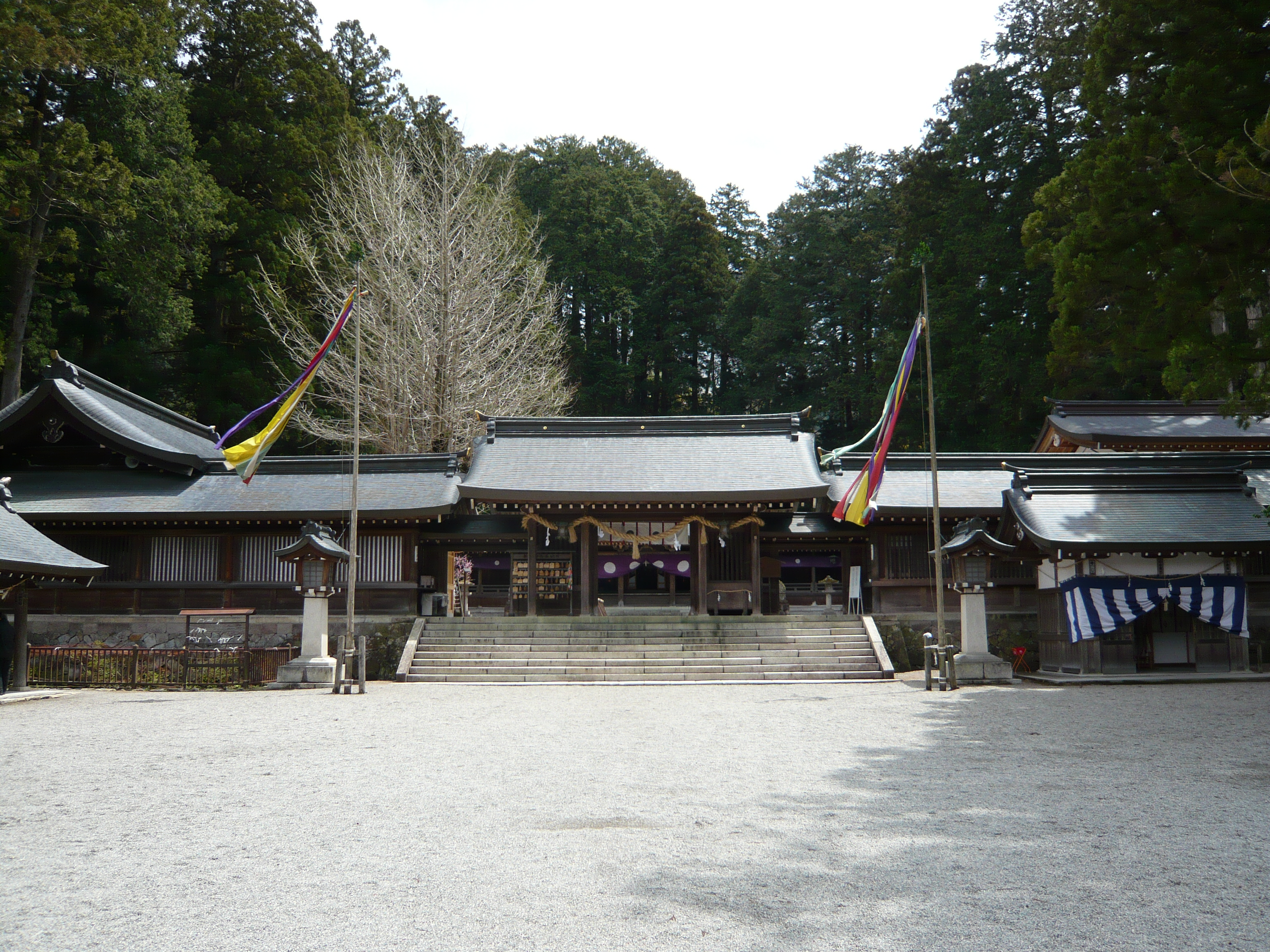
- Minashi Shrine

- Location within Gifu Prefecture Location within Japan

Religion
- Affiliation: Shinto
- Deity: Toshigami
- Festival: May 2

Location
- Location: Takayama-shi, Gifu-ken 502-0071 Japan
- Interactive map of Minashi Shrine 水無神社
- Coordinates: 36°05′7.10″N 137°15′6.7″E

Architecture
- Established: 9th century

Website
- Official website

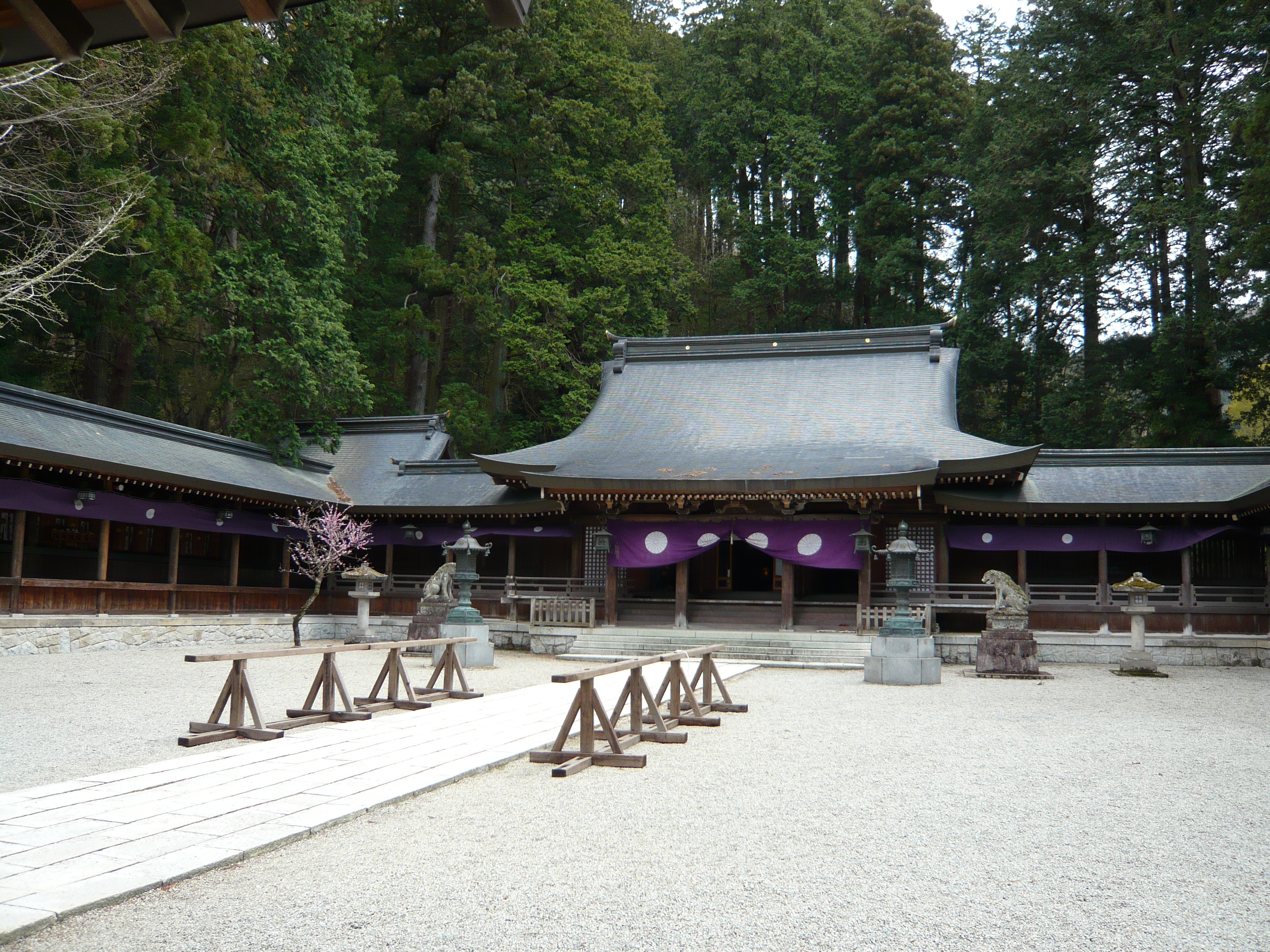
Minashi Shrine haiden

Hida-Ichinomiya Minashi Shrine (飛騨一宮水無神社, Hida Ichinomiya Minashi Jinja), commonly: Minashi Shrine (水無神社, Minashi Jinja) is a Shinto shrine located in the Ichinomiya neighborhood of the city of Takayama, Gifu Prefecture, Japan. It is the ichinomiya of the former Hida Province. The main festival of the shrine is held annually on May 2.

== Enshrined kami ==
The primary kami enshrined at Minashi Jinja is:

- Toshigami (御歳大神), the god of the year.

== History ==
There are no official records marking the construction of the shrine; however, during the reign of Emperor Seiwa (858–878), the shrine appears in official records and was given Junior Fourth Rank, Upper Grade court rank. The shrine is listed in the Engishiki records. During the Kamakura period, it was referred toes the "Minashi Dai-gongen" and in the Muromachi period as the "Minashi Myōjin" or the "Minashi Hachiman". During the Meiji period era of State Shinto, the shrine was designated as a National shrine, 3rd rank (国幣小社, Kokuhei Shosha) under the Modern system of ranked Shinto Shrines from 1871. From 1874 to 1877, Shimazaki Masaki, the father of author Shimazaki Tōson and model for the main character of his seminal work Before the Dawn was the kannushi of this shrine.

Because of the bombing of Nagoya in World War II, Minashi Shrine served as a refuge for Atsuta Shrine's Kusanagi from August 21 to September 19, 1945.

The shrine is located an eight-minute walk from Hida-Ichinomiya Station on the JR Central Takayama Main Line.

== Gallery ==
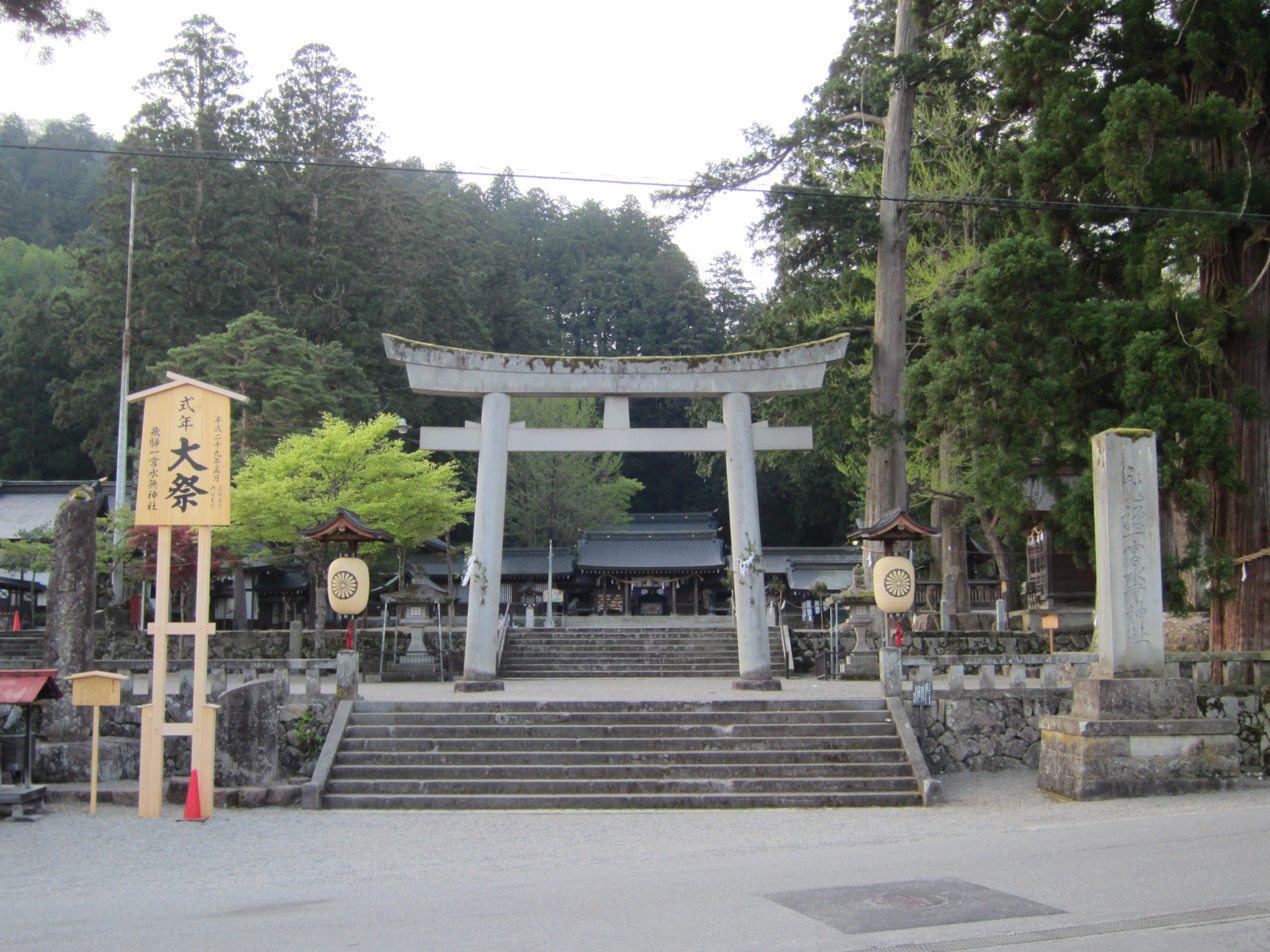
Approach

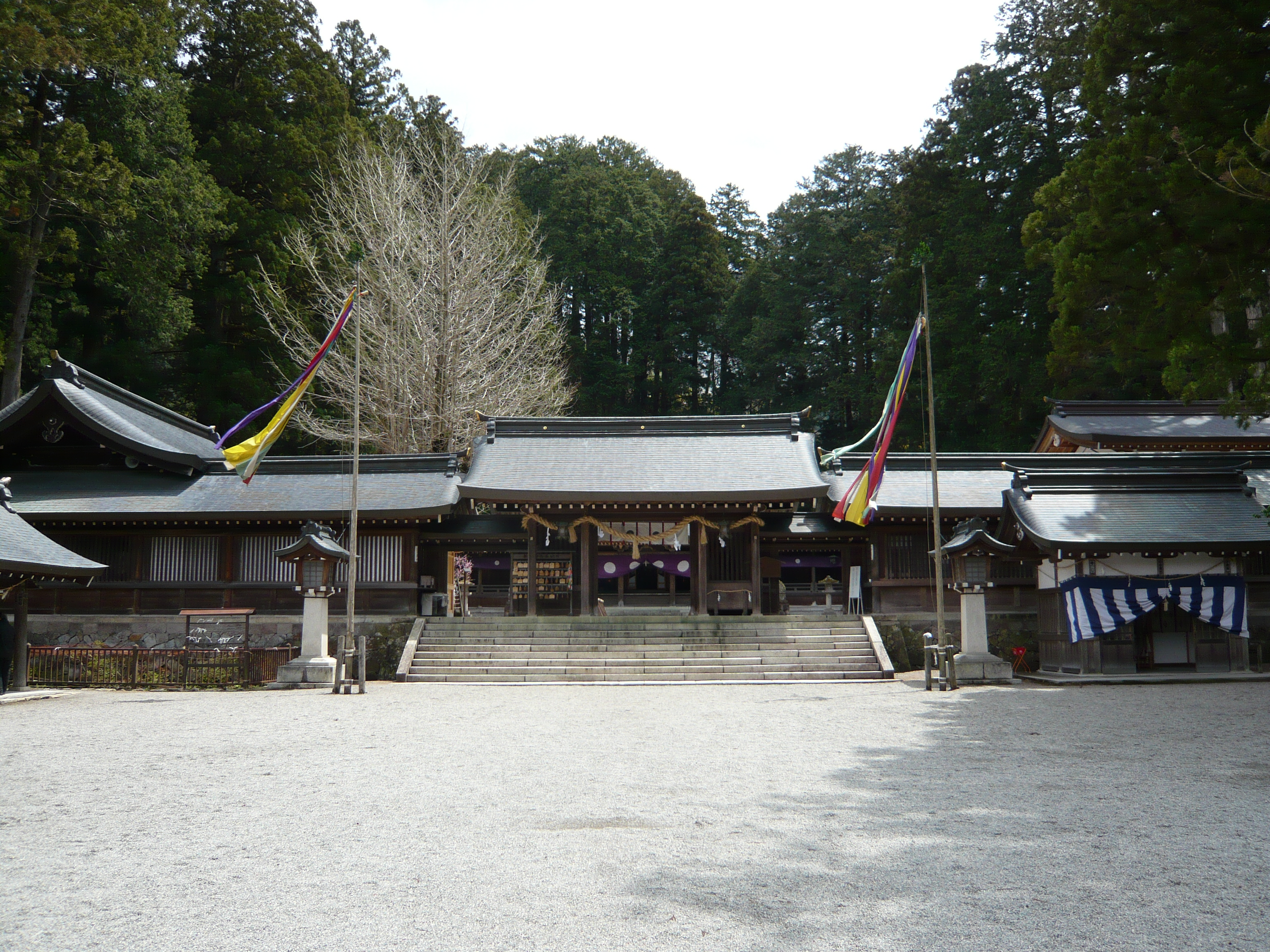
Precincts

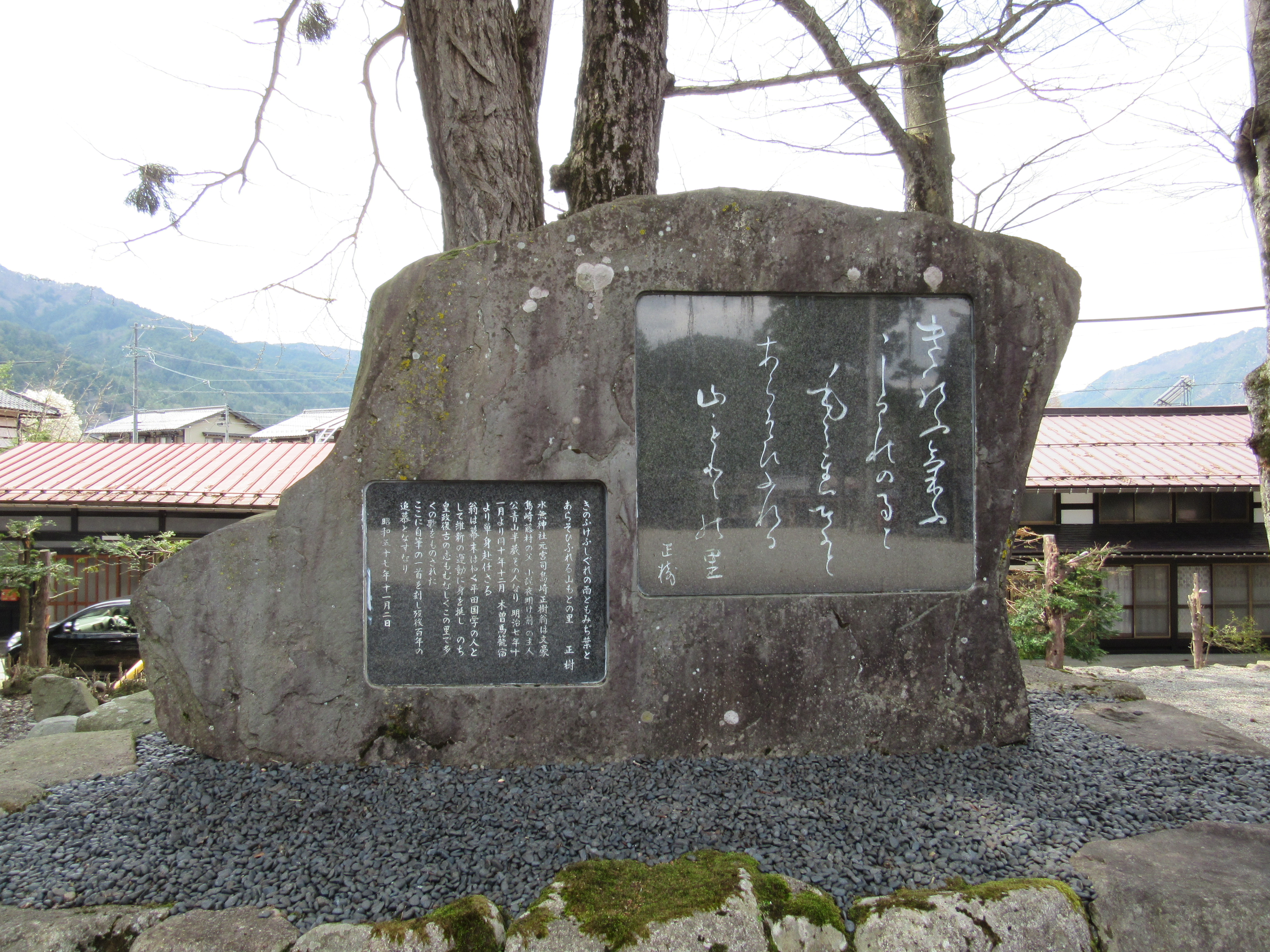
Memorial to Shimazaki Masaki

== Cultural Properties ==
- Wooden statues of Hida Ichinomiya Mizunashi Jinja kami (木造飛騨一宮水無神社神像), Heian to Kamakura period; These statues were discovered in 1933 beneath the floor of the Honden of Minashi Shrine. There are a total of 50 statues, all male. Most of the statues are adorned with a crown or a headpiece, robes, and hands clasped inside their robes, holding a scepter. However, with the exception of five statues carved in front of their chests, none of the original scepters have been lost. The statues vary in size, with the largest being 74.5 cm and the smallest being 22.8 cm, making most of the statues relatively small. Also included within this group are 12 pairs or triads of statues believed to have been created by the same artist. While most of the statues were created after the Kamakura period, some are from the Heian period. Statues 1, 2, and 3 are particularly well preserved, suggesting they may date back to the Heian period.

== See also ==
- List of Shinto shrines
- Ichinomiya
