= Tanaka Ōhide =

Japanese scholar

- 田中 大秀
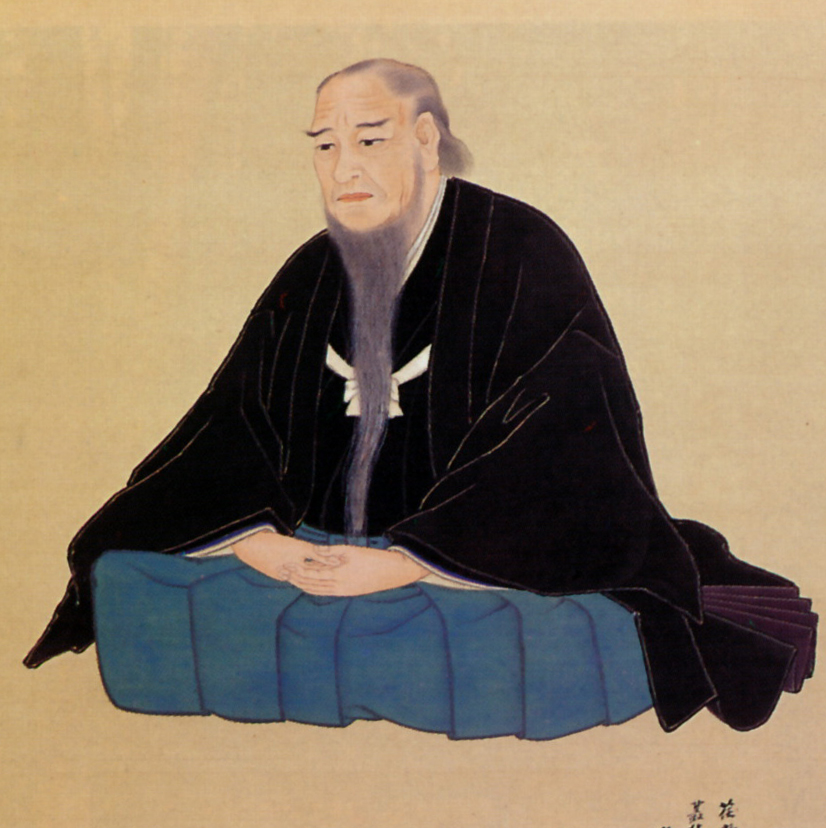
- Portrait of Tanaka Ōhide
- Born: Tanaka Ōhide; 1777; Takayama, Hida Province, Japan
- Died: 1847 (aged 69–70); Takayama, Hida Province, Japan
- Occupations: Scholar, commenter

Academic background
- Influences: Motoori Norinaga

Academic work
- Main interests: Kokugaku
- Notable works: Taketori no Okina no Monogatari Kai
- Influenced: Tachibana Akemi; Shimazaki Masaki

Tanaka Ōhide (田中 大秀) (1777-1847) was a Japanese antiquary, folklorist, lexicographer, ethnographer, and scholar of the nationalist kokugaku movement. He is best known for his commentary on the Taketori Monogatari (The Tale of the Bamboo Cutter).

== Biography ==
Tanaka Ōhide was born in Takayama, Hida Province in 1777.

At the age of 21, he went to Atsuta in Owari, where he began to study waka poetry and kokugaku philosophy. He studied in the Atsuta Shrine under the supervision of the Shinto priest Awata Tomokane. From 1801, Ōhide also began to attend Norinaga's lectures and became one of his students. In 1804, after Norinaga's death, he took up the study of his posthumous legacy, living for several months at his house in Matsusaka.

Ōhide's scholarship focused on classical and medieval monogatari tales and diaries, such as the Ochikubo Monogatari, Kagerō Nikki, and Tosa Nikki. But he was most interested in Taketori Monogatari, for which he wrote the detailed commentary. Ōhide became skilled in courtly arts such as prose writing, poetry composition, and playing the flute and koto.

In 1812, Ōhide completed the first draft of Taketori no Okina no Monogatari Kai. He then submitted it to the attention of Nabunaga's famous students, Suzuki Akira and Motoori Ōhira. After receiving their comments and suggestions, Ōhide revised his work into a final version, which was completed in 1820.

In 1831, a printing block copy of his work was printed. By that time, Ōhide had already gained a well-deserved reputation and had his own students at Gifu and Fukui.

In 1844, Ōhide designed a mechanical bascule bridge for the Ena Shrine. Using medieval gazetteers, Ōhide identified the locations of many rural cemeteries that had been forgotten and fallen into disrepair. He oversaw repairs and reconstruction work on a number of these cemeteries. He also installed a memorial stele at the springs of Tarui, where the ancient hero Yamato Takeru was said to have washed his eyes.

Ōhide had a lifelong admiration for Mount Kurai, and in his later years wrote a number of poems about it. He died of illness in 1847 at the age of 71. His jisei is recorded as follows,

Now I lie down to sleep in the pine shadows of Matsumuro, and ask that the eternal green be my friend
今日よりは我まつむろに蔭しめてちよのみどりを友とたのまむ

His grave is located at the Matsumuro-oka cemetery in Takayama, Gifu. It has been designated as a historic site of prefectural importance.

== Selected works ==
- Taketori Monogatari, The Commentary on the Tale of the Bamboo Cutter, 『竹取翁物語解』
- Ochikubo Monogatari, The Commentary on the Tale of Ochikubo, 『落窪物語解』
- Tosa Nikki, The Commentary on the Tosa Diary, 『土佐日記解』

== In culture ==
Tanaka Ōhide is mentioned in Before the Dawn, the most famous historical novel of Tōson Shimazaki.

== See also ==
- Hirao Rosen
