= William E. Naff =

American scholar of Japanese literature

William E. Naff (1929–2005) was an American scholar of Japanese language and literature.

He was born on February 14, 1929, in Wenatchee, Washington State, and served with the US Air Force from 1946-1949. He received a BA degree, magna cum laude, from the University of Washington, and subsequently earned an MA in Japanese history and a Ph.D. in Japanese literature from the same university.

In 1969 he became founding chairman of the department of Asian Languages and Literature at the University of Massachusetts Amherst. In addition to teaching Japanese language and literature, he taught Japanese culture, scientific Japanese, science fiction and sometimes Chinese literature.

His translation of Tōson Shimazaki's novel Before the Dawn (夜明け前, Yoakemae) received the Japan–U.S. Friendship Commission Prize for the Translation of Japanese Literature in 1987. He also completed a biography of Shimazaki Toson, The Kiso Road: The Life and Times of Shimazaki Toson. His translation of the 8-volume historical novel by Shiba Ryotaro, Clouds Over the Hills (Saka no Ue no Kumo), which tells the story of Japan from the Meiji Restoration to the Russo-Japanese War and Japan's emergence on the world stage, was uncompleted at his death.
