= Hakodate bugyō =

Officials of the Tokugawa shogunate in Japan

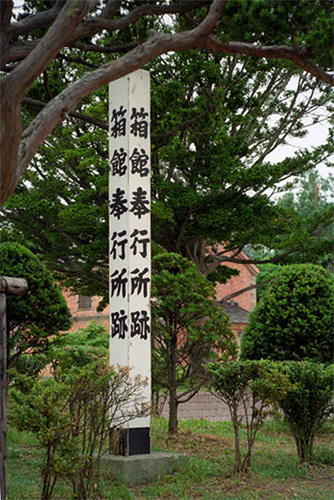
Site of the former Hakodate Bugyō office, at Goryōkaku

Hakodate bugyō (箱館奉行) were officials of the Tokugawa shogunate in Edo period Japan. Appointments to this prominent office were usually fudai daimyō, but this was amongst the senior administrative posts open to those who were not daimyō. Conventional interpretations have construed these Japanese titles as "commissioner" or "overseer" or "governor."

Hakodate is a port city on the southern coast of Hokkaidō island, separated from northern Honshū by the Tsugaru Strait. In 1779, the Tokugawa shogunate exerted direct control over Hakodate, and rapid development in the area soon followed.

This bakufu title identifies an official responsible for administration of the port city of Hakodate and neighboring territory of Ezo. The bugyō were also directly responsible for the conduct of relations with foreigners in this region. The office was created in 1802. There were two men holding the title concurrently, one being at any given time in Hadodate and his counterpart would be in Edo; and periodically, the two would exchange places.

== List of Hakodate bugyō ==
- Takeuchi Yasunori, 1854-1861.
- Muzuno Tadanori, 1862.
- Muragaki Awaji-no-kami, 1863
- Kurimoto Jōun, 1867.

== See also ==
- Bugyō
