= Tsunoda Tadayuki =

19th century Japanese priest

- 角田 忠行
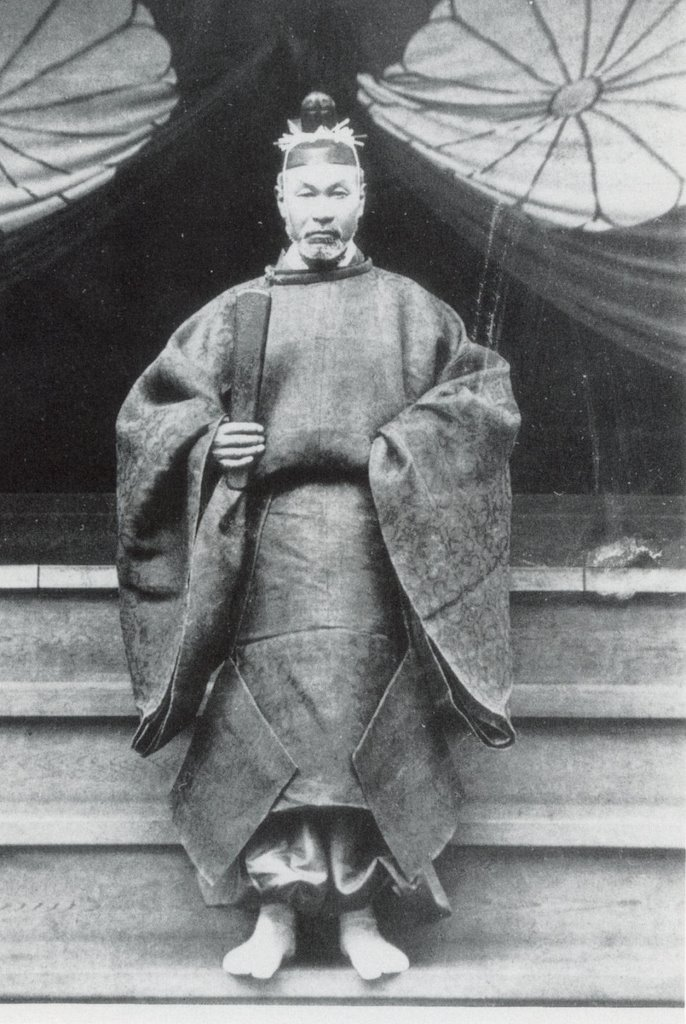
- Photograph of Tsunoda Tadayuki
- Born: 1834; Nagadoro Village, Okutono Domain, Shinano Province, Japan
- Died: 1918 (aged 83–84); Nagoya, Aichi Prefecture, Japan
- Other name: Yonegawa Shinanō (米川 信濃)
- Occupation: Priest

Tsunoda Tadayuki (角田 忠行; 1834–1918) was a Japanese scholar of kokugaku and a Shinto priest.

== Biography ==
Tsunoda Tadayuki was born in 1834 in the remote village of Nagadoro (now within the city of Saku, Nagano Prefecture), the second son of Tsunoda Tadamori (角田 忠守), a kannushi of the local Chikatsu Shrine. Additionally, his father served as a tutor to the Naitō daimyo of Iwamurada Domain and an instructor at the domain school, the Tatsudōkan (達道館). Little is known of his early life and childhood.

In 1855, he absconded from his domain and travelled to Edo in order to study under the mitogaku theorist Fujita Tōko. Around that time, he formally became a disciple of the kokugaku theologian Hirata Kanetane, heir to the legacy of Hirata Atsutane.

Later, in 1863, Tsunoda was one of a group of anti-foreign extremists who carried out the Ashikaga Statue Decapitation Incident at Tōji-in in the vicinity of Kyoto. He was thereafter hunted by shogunate spies and hid for several years in the residence of Matsuo Tase, a fellow Hirata disciple, in the Ina Valley of the Tenryū River.

In 1867, with the imminent outbreak of the Boshin War, Tsunoda came out of hiding and, under the assumed name "Yonegawa Shinanō", entered into the service of Sawa Tamekazu. When Sawa was appointed governor-general of Northern Japan within the revolutionary Imperial Army, Tsunoda served as liaison with the Kubota Domain and was involved in that domain's defection from the shogunate.

Alongside many other Hirata disciples, Tsunoda attempted to enter into political service after the conclusion of the war. However, the progressive establishment, fearing that Hirata primitivism would obstruct the national modernization program, sought to expel Hirata influence from the government. As a result of this, Tsunoda was dispatched to serve as a provincial shrine priest and thereby removed from direct involvement in national affairs.

Shrines to which he was attached included Hirota, Shimogamo, and finally Atsuta Shrine where he served as high priest. He served in that capacity until his retirement in 1914.

To the end of his life Tsunoda despised all things Western, and made a point of never wearing a single piece of Western clothing. Only once, on the occasion of an audience with the Emperor, was an exception made for a suit.

== Legacy ==
Tsunoda, under the fictional name Kureta Masaka (暮田 正香), is a major character depicted in Shimazaki Tōson's epic novel Before the Dawn, first published in 1929.

== Selected works ==
- Koshiryaku (古史略, Outline of Ancient History)
- Ibukinoya kashū (氣吹廼舎歌集, Collected Poetry of the House of Breath)
- Kaze no oto (風の音, Sound of the Wind)
- Sōji ryakki (葬事略記, Outline History of Funeral Matters)
- Atsuta Jingū ryakki (熱田神宮略記, Outline History of Atsuta Shrine)

== Bibliography ==
- 市村 Ichimura, 咸人 Minato (1973). 伊那尊王思想史 Ina sonnō shisō shi. 国書刊行会 Kokushokankōkai.
- 阪本 Sakamoto, 是丸 Koremaru (April 1, 1993). 明治維新と国学者 Meiji ishin to kokugakusha. 大明堂 Daimeidō. ISBN 4470200379.
- 芳賀 Haga, 登 Noboru (August 1, 1984). 日本思想大系 51 国学運動の思想 Nihon shisō taikei 51 kokugaku undō no shisō. 岩波書店 Iwanami Shoten. ISBN 4000700510.
- 角田忠行翁小伝 Tsunoda Tadayuki Ō shōden. 熱田神宮宮庁 Atsuta Jingū Kyūchō.
- NAMIKI, Eiko,"Tsunoda Tadayuki’s Chinkon setsu (Treatise on Chinkon): Philological Introduction, Critical Edition, and Annotated Translation" (2025-12-15). Humanities : Christianity and Culture. Vol. 57. 国際基督教大学. p. 67-116. https://cir.nii.ac.jp/crid/1390307900752461184,https://doi.org/10.34577/0002000399.
