= Yamaguni Hyōbu =

Japanese military strategist (1793-1865)

- 山國 兵部

Personal details
- Born: 1793 Mito Domain, Hitachi Province, Japan
- Died: March 1, 1865 (aged 71–72) Tsuruga Domain, Echizen Province, Japan
- Cause of death: Decapitation

Yamaguni Hyōbu Tomoaki (山國 兵部 喜八郎 共昌; 1793-1865) was a Japanese samurai retainer of the Mito Domain, military strategist, and student of the Hirata school of kokugaku. His kokugaku pen name was Shikanoya (止戈堂; transl. "house of the sika").

== Biography ==
He was born the eldest son of Yamaguni Yazaemon Tomofusa (山國 弥左衛門 共綿), a Mito retainer, under the name Yamaguni Tomoaki. His younger brother was Tamaru Inanoemon (田丸 稲之衛門). He later adopted the hyakkanna name "Hyōbu".

In 1809, Yamaguni succeeded as head of the Yamaguni family and was assigned to the Mito guard division. Thereafter, he served as a strategist within the great guard (大番組, ōbangumi) and in 1823 assumed the post of majordomo (小納戸, konando).

In 1830, he was recognized by Tokugawa Nariaki and became a metsuke. At that time Yamaguni was involved in the military reform of the Mito Domain. In 1838, Yamaguni was placed under house arrest for unclear reasons, but was quickly released and reappointed as a military officer in 1840.

In 1846, when Nariaki was sentenced to house arrest by the central government, Yamaguni too was arrested due to his political affiliation with him. In 1849, he was pardoned.

In 1853, in the aftermath of the arrival of the United States, Nariaki was summoned by the shogunate to Edo in order to serve as an advisor on matters of naval defense. Yamaguni accompanied him to the capital as a military attaché, and became well known for his outspoken advocacy for a network of coastal fortifications to deter a European or American invasion. He also advocated using the mountainous interior of Honshū as a national redoubt.

Emperor Kōmei was outraged by the Shogunate's acquiescence to the United States' demands, and in 1858 issued a secret missive to the Mito authorities to "reorganize" the Shogunate. This became known as the Secret Command of Bogo. However, the Shogunate detected this and its conspirators, including Yamaguni, were arrested. Yamaguni was released after Nariaki's death in 1860.

By 1862, Yamaguni had returned to his post as metsuke. The following year, he accompanied the return of Tokugawa Yoshiatsu to the capital.

In 1864, during the Mito Rebellion, he was ordered to pacify the Tengutō encamped on Mount Taiheizan under the command of Takeda Kōunsai. Yamaguni sympathized with the rebels, and advised them to relocate to a more defensible position on Mount Tsukuba. Upon his return, he was imprisoned once again for his disobedience. However, when Yamaguni became aware that Matsudaira Yorinori, lord of the Shishido Domain, joined Takeda's force in the rebellion, he broke himself out of prison and joined Yorinori's division. After Yorinori committed seppuku, Yamaguni was incorporated into the Tengutō remnants led by Takeda. Yamaguni's tactical guidance was responsible for several of the Tengutō's rapid victories against more numerous Shogunal forces, including at the Battle of Wada Pass (和田峠の戦い) on December 18. Takeda and Yamaguni intended to proceed to Kyoto in order to make a direct appeal to the Imperial Court, but the remnants were captured in Tsuruga, Echizen Province, and both were sentenced to death along with the other leaders of the uprising in 1865. Yamaguni's entire family was punished as well; his sons were executed and his daughters were condemned to life imprisonment.

The jisei of Yamaguni Hyōbu is recorded as follows,

I will go to fight demons in the land of the dead
行くさきは冥土の鬼と一勝負
