= Mito Rebellion =

1864-65 anti-shogunate uprising in the Mito Domain, Japan

Mito rebellion 水戸幕末争乱
- Part of Bakumatsu conflicts
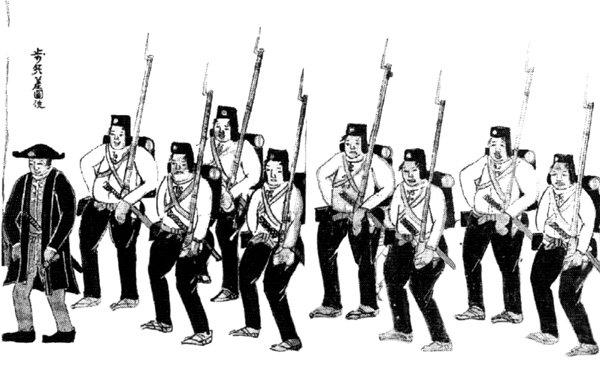
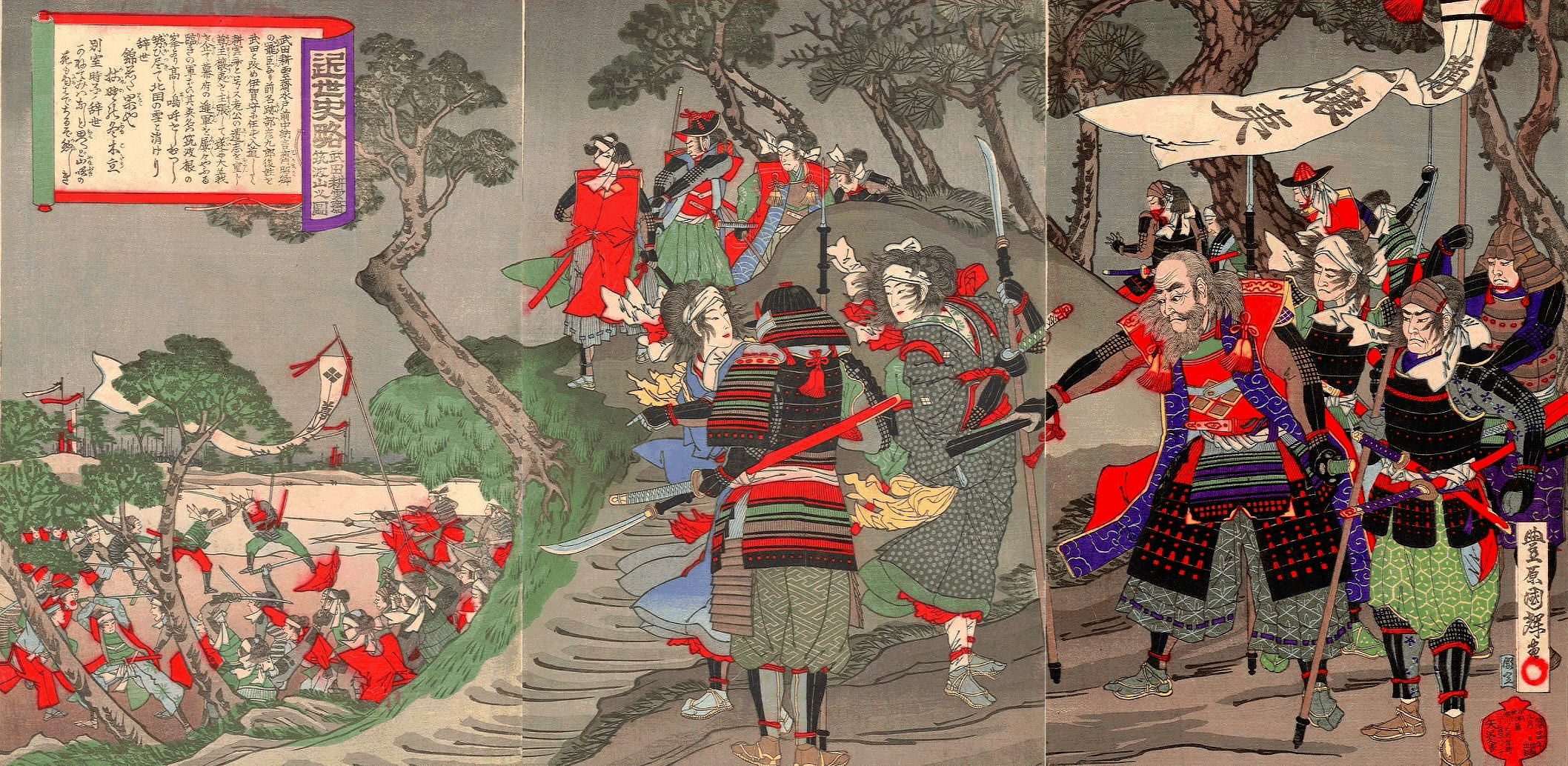
- Shogunate troops moving to quell the Mito rebellion in 1864. "Takeda Kōunsai at Mt. Tsukuba" by Utagawa Kuniteru III
Date	May 2, 1864 – January 14, 1865 (8 months, 1 week and 5 days)
Location	Eastern Japan
Result	Shogunate victory

Belligerents
Tengutō; Shishido Domain; Local samurai and kokugakusha volunteers	Tokugawa shogunate; Mito Domain; Sagara Domain; Suwa Domain; Matsumoto Domain; Iida Domain; Takasaki Domain; Kasama Domain

Commanders and leaders
Takeda Kōunsai (executed); Yamakuni Hyōbu (executed); (Shishido Domain) Matsudaira Yorinori (executed); Kameyama Yoshiharu (executed)	(Tokugawa shogunate) Tokugawa Yoshinobu; (Tokugawa shogunate) Takenaka Shigekata; Ichikawa Sanzaemon; (Sagara Domain) Tanuma Okitaka; (Suwa Domain) Yajima Denzaemon; (Suwa Domain) Shiohara Hikoshichi

Strength
2,000	About 10,000

Casualties and losses
About 1,300 rebels killed, around 353 were executed, and 100 died in captivity	Around 6,700 shogunate members killed

The Mito rebellion (水戸幕末争乱, Mito bakumatsu sōran), also called the Kantō Insurrection or the Tengutō Rebellion (天狗党の乱, tengutō no ran), was a civil war that occurred in the area of Mito Domain in Japan from May 2, 1864 to January 14, 1865. It involved an uprising and terrorist actions against the central power of the Shogunate in favour of the sonnō jōi ("Revere the emperor, expel the barbarians") movement.

== Outline ==
A shogunal pacification force was sent to Mount Tsukuba on 17 June 1864, consisting of 700 Mito soldiers led by Ichikawa, with 3 to 5 cannons and at least 200 firearms, as well as a Tokugawa shogunate force of 3,000 men with over 600 firearms and several cannons.

As the conflict escalated, on 10 October 1864 at Nakaminato, the shogunate force of 6,700 was defeated by 2,000 insurgents, and several shogunal defeats followed.

The insurgents were weakening, however, dwindling to about 1,000. By December 1864 they faced a new force under Tokugawa Yoshinobu (himself born in Mito) numbering over 10,000, which ultimately forced them to surrender.

The uprising resulted in 1,300 dead on the rebels' side, which suffered vicious repression, including 353 executions and approximately 100 who died in captivity.

== Other ==
- Mito and Hikone had been hostile since the Sakurada Gate incident in 1860. Mito and Hikone were reconciled by Tsuruga, the death place of Tengutō members, after 110 years of the incident.

== See also ==
- Mito Domain
- Shinpūren rebellion
