= Iida Domain =

Feudal domain under the Tokugawa shogunate of Edo period Japan

Iida Domain 飯田藩
- under Tokugawa shogunate Japan
- 1601–1871
- Capital: Iida Castle
  - Type: Daimyō
- Historical era: Edo period
  - Established: 1601
  - Disestablished: 1871
- Today part of: Nagano Prefecture

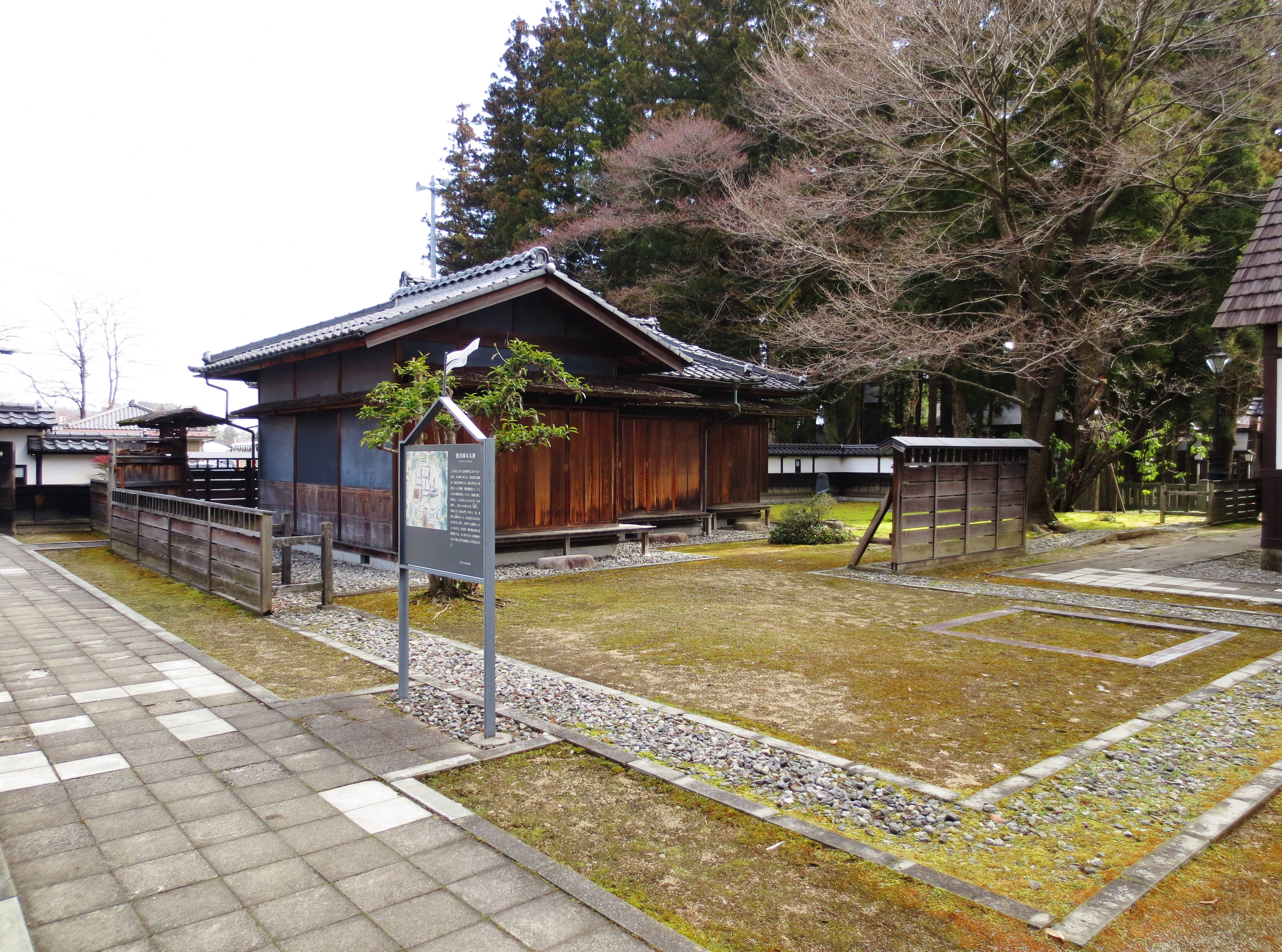
site of the donjon of Iida Castle, administrative centre of Iida Domain

Iida Domain (飯田藩, Iida-han) was a feudal domain under the Tokugawa shogunate of Edo period Japan. It is located in Shinano Province, Honshū. The domain was centered at Iida Castle, located in what is now part of the town of Iida in Nagano Prefecture. It was also known as Shinano-Iida Domain (信濃飯田藩, Shinano-Iida-han).

== History ==
The area around Iida had been ruled during the Sengoku period by Akiyama Nobutomo, a retainer of Takeda Shingen. After the destruction of the Takeda clan, the lands came under the control of Tokugawa Ieyasu and were ruled by Suganuma Sadatoshi, followed by Mori Hideyori, and Kyōgoku Takatomo. Following the Battle of Sekigahara and the establishment of the Tokugawa shogunate, Ogasawara Hidemasa was relocated to Iida from Koga Domain in Shimōsa Province and made daimyō with Iida Domain, a 50,000 koku holding in Shinano Province. After his transfer to Matsumoto Domain in 1613, the territory reverted to tenryō status ruled directly by the shogunate until 1617, when it was reassigned to Wakizaka Yasumoto, formerly of Ōzu Domain in Iyo Province. His son, Wakizaka Yasumoto followed, reducing the domain by 2,000 koku with a gift to one of his uncles. He was transferred to Tatsuno Domain in Harima Province in 1672, where his descendants resided to the Meiji restoration.

The Wakizawa were replaced by a junior branch of the Hori clan and the holdings of the domain were reduced to 20,000 koku. The domain's finances were never in good condition, and the situation continued to deteriorate over the years leading to widespread rioting in 1762 and in 1809. The 10th daimyō, Hori Chikashige was a close supporter of Mizuno Tadakuni and held important posts within the Shogunal government, including rōjū. the domain as increased to 27,000 koku, but was dropped to 17,000 koku on the failure of the Tenpō Reforms and subsequent backlash. During the Bakumatsu period, the domain lost another 2,000 koku for failing to stop passage of anti-government forces through its territory during the Mito rebellion.

During the Boshin War, the domain supported the imperial side. In July 1871, with the abolition of the han system, Iida Domain briefly became Iida Prefecture, and was later merged into the newly created Nagano Prefecture. Under the new Meiji government, Hori Chikahiro, the last daimyō of Iida Domain was given the kazoku peerage title of shishaku (viscount).

== Bakumatsu period holdings ==
As with most domains in the han system, Iida Domain consisted of several discontinuous territories calculated to provide the assigned kokudaka, based on periodic cadastral surveys and projected agricultural yields.

- Shinano Province
  - 25 villages in Ina District

== List of daimyō ==
#	Name	Tenure	Courtesy title	Court Rank	kokudaka	Notes
Ogasawara clan (fudai) 1601-1613
1	Ogasawara Hidemasa (小笠原秀政)	1600-1613	Hyobu-daifu (兵部大輔)	Lower 5th (従五位下)	50,000 koku	transfer from Koga Domain
tenryō 1613-1617
Wakizaka clan (tozama / fudai) 1617-1672
1	Wakizaka Yasumoto (脇坂安元)	1617-1654	Awaji-no-kami (淡路守)	Lower 5th (従五位下)	55,000 koku	transfer from Ōzu Domain
2	Wakizawa Yasumasa (脇坂安政)	1654-1672	Nakatsukasa-no-sho (中務少輔)	Lower 5th (従五位下)	55,000 -> 53,000 koku	
Hori clan (tozama / fudai) 1672-1871
1	Hori Chikamasa (堀親昌)	1672-1673	Mimasaka-no-kami (美作守)	Lower 5th (従五位下)	20,000 koku	transfer from Karasuyama Domain
2	Hori Chikasada (堀親貞)	1673-1685	Suo-no-kami (周防守)	Lower 5th (従五位下)	20,000 koku	
3	Hori Chikatsune (堀親常)	1686-1697	Suo-no-kami (周防守)	Lower 5th (従五位下)	20,000 koku	
4	Hori Chikataka (堀親賢)	1697-1715	Yamato-no-kami (大和守)	Lower 5th (従五位下)	20,000 koku	
5	Hori Chikanobu (堀親庸)	1715-1728	Wakasa-no-kami (若狭守)	Lower 5th (従五位下)	20,000 koku	
6	Hori Chikatada (堀親蔵)	1728-1746	Yamato-no-kami (大和守)	Lower 5th (従五位下)	20,000 koku	
7	Hori Chikanaga (堀親長)	1746-1779	Yamato-no-kami (大和守)	Lower 5th (従五位下)	20,000 koku	
8	Hori Chikatada (堀親忠)	1779-1784	Yamashiro-no-kami (山城守)	Lower 5th (従五位下)	20,000 koku	
9	Hori Chikatami (堀親民)	1784-1796	Yamato-no-kami (大和守)	Lower 5th (従五位下)	20,000 koku	
10	Hori Chikashige (堀 親寚)	1796-1846	Yamato-no-kami (大和守)	Lower 4th (従四位下)	20,000 ->27,000 -> 17,000 koku	
11	Hori Chikayoshi (堀親義)	1846-1868	Iwami-no-kami (石見守); Jijū (侍従)	Lower 5th (従五位下)	17,000 ->15,000 koku	
11	Hori Chikahiro (堀親広)	1868-1871	Mimasaka-no-kami (美濃守)	Lower 5th (従五位下)	15,000 koku	

== See also ==
List of Han
