= The Family (Shimazaki novel) =

Novel by Tōson Shimazaki

- Cover of first English edition
- Author: Tōson Shimazaki
- Original title: 家 (Ie)
- Translator: Cecilia Segawa Seigle
- Language: Japanese
- Genre: Naturalist novel Autobiographical novel
- Publisher: Yomiuri Shimbun (1910); Chūō Kōron (1911)
- Publication date: 1910–11
- Publication place: Japan
- English publication date: 1976
- Media type: Print

The Family (Japanese: 家, Hepburn: Ie) is a Japanese novel written by Tōson Shimazaki, first serialized in 1910–11. This autobiographical novel deals with the disintegration of two provincial families, the Koizumis and the Hashimotos.

== Plot ==
The Family covers a period of twelve years in the lives of the Koizumi and the Hashimoto families, from 1898 to 1910. (These two families are based on the real-life families of Shimazaki and Takase: one was Tōson's own family and the other the family into which his eldest sister married.) Originally well respected, the families find themselves slipping down the social ladder as their eldest sons, Koizumi Minoru and Hashimoyo Tatsuo, take on disastrous financial projects. The character Sankichi is the youngest son of the Koizumi family, a writer, and an alter ego for the author himself.

== Translation ==
The Family was published in an English translation provided by Cecilia Segawa Seigle in 1976.
