= Oguri Kozukenosuke =

Japanese politician

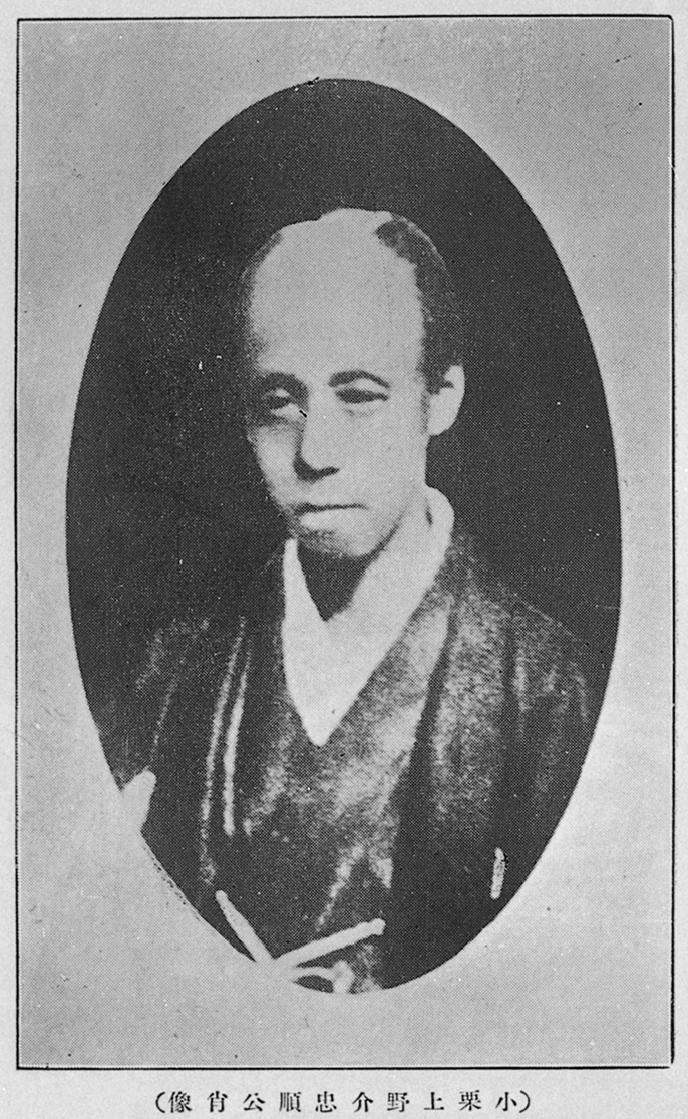
- Born: 16 July 1827
- Died: 27 May 1868 (aged 40)
- Other names: Gotaro, Tadamasa, Mataichi
- Occupations: finance magistrate, foreign affairs magistrate, naval magistrate
- Spouse: Michiko
- Children: Kuniko, Sadao, Tadamichi, Etsuko
- Parents: Tadataka (father); Kuniko (mother)

Oguri Kozukenosuke (Oguri Tadamasa, 16 July 1827 – 27 May 1868) was a statesman of the Tokugawa government in the last stage of the Edo period, and he is often regarded as a rival of Katsu Kaishu. At the time when the power of the Tokugawa government was diminishing, he took the posts of finance magistrate twice, and that of the foreign magistrate once. Also, he decided to construct the first arsenal in Japan (Yokosuka arsenal), and this decision contributed to the Meiji Restoration.

== Early life ==
He was born in Edo in 1827. Because he was the first son of an honorable hatamoto Oguri, he got promoted smoothly from his youth. When he was 7, he started to learn Sinology from Asaka Gonsai, Kenjutsu from Toranosuke Shimada, Jujutsu from Suketaro Kubota, and gunnery from Kazue Tatsuki. At the age of 14, he told the lord of Harima han (country subdivision) that Japan should build more ships and advance economically to countries overseas, the idea he was inspired with by Keinosuke Yuuki. The lord liked him and wanted to marry his daughter to him. He was first appointed to a position in the Edo Castle at the age of 17. This promotion was due to his gift for the martial arts. He married the daughter of the lord when he was 21. His wife, named Michiko, was dauntless and a good adviser of Oguri. When he was around thirty, Ii Naosuke took to him, and Oguri became a close follower of Ii.

== After Matthew C. Perry's visit to Japan ==
In 1854, when the black ships arrived at the Uraga port, the Tokugawa Government was compelled to take measures against pressures from the Great Powers. As one of them, the government decided to send missions to the U.S. in 1860, and Oguri accompanied them as a supervisor. The main reason that Oguri, who did not have any standing in the Edo government, could join them was that there had been a recommendation from Ii. At that time in the Edo Castle, there was a scramble for political power among Ii’s faction and Abe’s faction. Abe Masahiro was a Roju, and while Ii was a conservative person, he was an earnest reformist. At the time when Oguri was appointed to a mission, Abe had already been dead, and Ii became Tairou. He was scheming to punish all his opponents, but simultaneously, he was preparing for retaliation from the opponents. Since Ii did not want Oguri to be involved into such complication, he kept Oguri at a distance.

When Oguri reached the US, he visited several places and realized the gigantic power of civilization. In Washington, he visited a dockyard and was convinced that the power of the US came from there. From this experience, he was strongly convinced that the Tokugawa government should own a shipyard. The missions were also greatly welcomed by Americans. The newspaper there reported Oguri as the most chivalrous Japanese person, since he was polite and always wearing traditional Japanese clothes.

In November 1860, soon after his return to Japan, he was appointed as a foreign magistrate. However, he soon resigned from his post in September next year. This decision was triggered by his remorse for the fact that he had no choice other than to rely on the British navy, when Russia invaded Japanese territory, Tsushima.

In June 1862, The Government ordered Oguri to be in the post of financial magistrate. It was at this time that he was granted his name “Kozukenosuke”. Before this, people used to call him Mataiti Oguri, or Bungonosuke Oguri. As a financial magistrate, he carried out reduction of the expenditure. His way of saving money was unorthodox; he put priorities on tasks. He saved a lot from what is trifling, and saved little for what is important. This way of money saving was different from the methods other politicians used; they tried to save money equally for all tasks. His policy was very effective, but was opposed by many.

In December, he was appointed to the warship magistrate. In this period, he tried to materialize his plan to build a shipyard. First, he requested technological aid from the Netherlands, but it was rejected. Then he asked France. Since France was yet to have relations with Japan, she was cooperative. The construction of the shipyard would cost a huge amount of money, and this caused many politicians to oppose Oguri. His opposing argument was as follows: "Since the Tokugawa government own ships, there should be a place to repair them." At last, his suggestion was accepted in 1865, and the construction was started on September 27. After the acceptance, he resigned his post; he expressed that he was not pursuing his own interest. Rather, it was for the government's sake.

In October, five months after Oguri was again appointed to the financial magistrate, the last shogunate Yoshinobu Tokugawa returned his political right back to the emperor (Taiseihoukan). In 1866, January, a war occurred in the suburb of Kyoto. In the middle of the war, Yoshinobu, returned to Edo Castle; he did not have a will to fight against them. However, in contrast to his lord, Oguri asserted that they resist the army of the new government, and suggested a surprising tactics. Yoshinobu was irritated with his aggressive attitude, and discharged Oguri from financial magistrate. Faithful Oguri was discouraged, and decided to migrate to Joshu Gonda village on February 28.

== After retirement ==
In April, the army of the new Meiji government reached Gonda village, and claimed that Oguri was hiding there in preparation for a rebellion. Although this claim was incoherent, he presented himself to them, in order to avoid endangering the villagers. He was made a scapegoat, and killed by beheading on April 6, at age 42. It is said that he did not protest against them even in the slightest. At Kurabuti, Takasaki City, Gunma Prefecture erected a monument in memory of him. The inscription reads: "The great man Oguri Kozukenosuke, innocent of the charges against him, was executed here."

Three years after his death, in 1871, the shipyard in Yokosuka was completed, and, still now, it is running in Yokosuka city.

His life was covred on upcoming Taiga drama The Shogunate Rebel (2027)

== Reputation ==
- Togo Heihachiro
  - “Thanks to the dockyard Oguri established, we could win this war. (Japan-Russia war)”
  - “Kozukenosuke Oguri is a person who possessed five kinds of virtue: Jin, gi, rei, chi, and shin.”
- Okuma Shigenobu
  - “I suppose, all reforms of the Meiji government is based on Oguri’s idea.”
- Toson Shimazaki
  - “Normally, people try to escape from the house being corrupt. However, Kozukenosuke Oguri was noble enough to stay in the crumbling house and did a job for the next generations.”’ (He is comparing the Tokugawa government to a crumbling house.)
- Ryoutarou Shiba
  - “He was a father of Meiji.”

== Sources ==
- 1. Murakami Taiken(2010), Oguri Kozukenosuke
- 2. ^Sonotoki Rekisi ga Ugoita (2002) – Broadcast on 20 November. Kaikaku ni titta saigo no bakunin (The last vassal of Tokugawa who deceased on the process of restoration) – Oguri Kozukenosuke – ippon no neji kara nihon no kindaika ha hajimatta (The restoration of Japan started over one single screw.)
- 3. ^Doumon, F. (2006). The Novel, Oguri Kouzukenosuke – The man who triggered restoration of Japan.
