= Hazama Hidenori =

- 間 秀矩
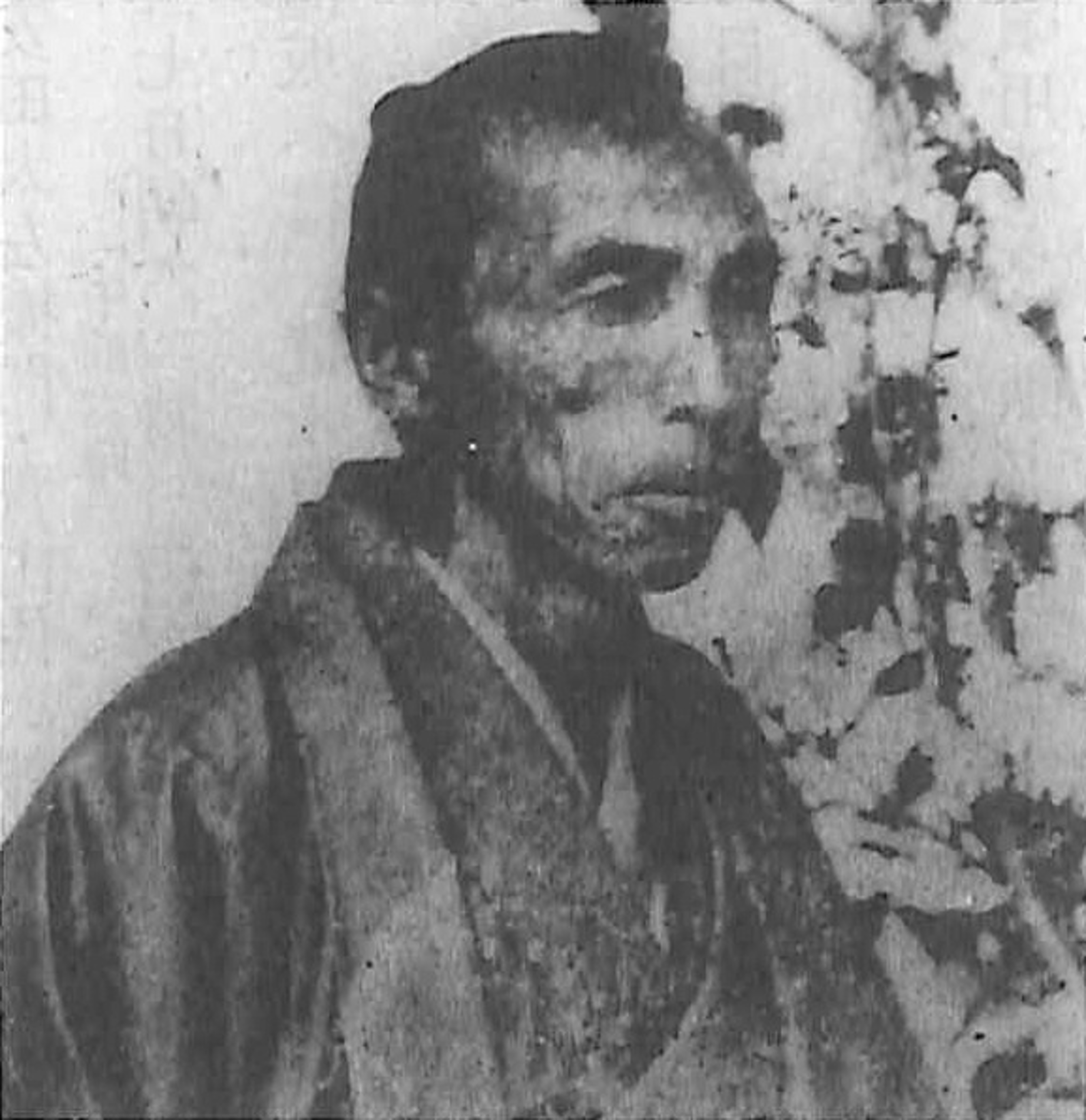
- Photograph of Hazama Hidenori, between 1860 and 1876

Personal details
- Born: February 9, 1822 Nakatsugawa-juku, Mino Province, Japan
- Died: January 23, 1876 (aged 53)

Hazama Hanbē Hidenori (間 半兵衛 秀矩; 1822-1876) was a Japanese scholar of kokugaku.

== Biography ==
Hazama Hidenori was born in the post station of Nakatsugawa in 1822.

At the age of 22, Hazama took over the family business. He also worked as a toiya at the Nakatsugawa honjin. Hazama Mokuemon Yoshinori (間 杢右衛門 喜矩), head of another branch of the Hazama family, transferred his hereditary toiya position to Hidenori at this time.

In the late 1850s, Hazama travelled to the foreign settlements along the Tōkaidō and was disgusted by the arrogance of the foreign residents and sailors there. At this time he first developed an interest in nationalistic kokugaku teachings. In October of 1859, Hazama's sister Majima Kiku (馬島 菊) introduced him to the Hirata school of kokugaku by way of her husband Majima Sei'an, a well-known local scholar of classical literature.

In 1862, Katsura Kogorō arrived at the Nakatsugawa honjin with an entourage including Shiji Bunta and Sera Toshisada. Their mission was to convince lord Mōri Takachika of the Chōshū Domain to align Chōshū's significant military potential with the anti-foreign cause. After three days of discussion, Mōri was convinced and the group went their separate ways. Hazama and his friend Ichioka Shigemasa helped in the arrangement of the "Chōshū-Nakatsugawa Conference" (長州中津川会談).

Hazama and Ichioka kept this meeting carefully secret, knowing that the Shogunate would dispense terrible punishment if their involvement became known. For their help, they were later trusted by Chōshū anti-foreign extremists with secret information emanating from Kyoto.

Over time, Hazama came to lose faith in Shintō as he realized how absurd its beliefs seemed to foreign visitors. He questioned how he could believe in the Shintō land creation sequence if no one outside of Japan did. He died after a long illness in 1876.
