= Mermet de Cachon =

French priest and Roman Catholic missionary

Eugène-Emmanuel Mermet-Cachon
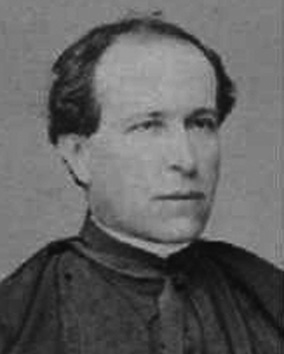
- Eugène-Emmanuel Mermet-Cachon
- Born: September 10, 1828; Jura, France
- Died: March 14, 1889 (aged 60); Cannes, France
- Occupations: Missionary, Linguist

Eugène-Emmanuel Mermet-Cachon (10 September 1828 – 14 March 1889), was a French priest and Roman Catholic missionary in Bakumatsu period Japan, who served as interpreter for and advisor to French diplomatic missions, playing crucial role in the development of a special relationship between the French government and the Tokugawa shogunate.

== Biography ==
Mermet-Cachon was born in La Pesse, in the Jura department in Franche-Comté in eastern France. He entered the seminary of the Paris Foreign Missions Society in July 1952 and was ordained on 11 June 1854. On 25 August 1854, less than two months after his ordination, he was sent to Hong Kong.

Together with Father Prudence Seraphin-Barthelemy Girard and Father Louis-Theodore Furet, he arrived at Naha, the capital of the Kingdom of Ryukyu on 6 May 1855. During his two years in Okinawa, he was unable to win a single convert; however, during this time he developed a working knowledge of the Japanese language. On his return to Hong Kong, he was recruited by Jean-Baptiste Louis Gros, whom he assisted at Edo with the negotiations cumulating in the Treaty of Amity and Commerce between France and Japan which was signed on 9 October 1858.

In November 1859 he returned to Japan, this time to Hakodate, the main town on the island of Hokkaido where he opened a French-language school of French in April 1860; however, his efforts to open a hospital were frustrated as Russian Orthodox missionaries had arrived first, and had received official blessing to establish a clinic. His efforts as a missionary also met with no success, and disappointed and humiliated, and suffering from ill health, he left Hakodate in 1863.

Mermet-Cachon returned to Edo and served as an interpreter for Prince Gustave Duchesne de Bellecourt, who was a strong advocate of the use of force to govern relations with Japan and who supported the French intervention in the 20 July 1863 Bombardment of Shimonoseki. After returning to France in July 1863, Mermet-Cachon abandoned the Paris Foreign Missions Society, and after renouncing his vows as a Catholic priest, returned to Japan in a private capacity as interpreter to the French diplomat Léon Roches in April 1864. On 1 April 1865, he established a French language school in Yokohama and took a former prostitute as his common-law wife. He returned to France again on 27 October 1866, apparently with the intention of making only a short stay; however, in 1867, he was requested to serve as an assistant to Tokugawa Akitake, the 14-year-old son of Tokugawa Nariaki, daimyō of Mito Domain, who had arrived as a special envoy of the Tokugawa shogunate for the 1867 World Fair in Paris, where Japan had a pavilion. He also acted as interpreter for Tokugawa Akitake's audience with Napoleon III, which subsequently resulted in strong French support for the Tokugawa shogunate. Mermet-Cachon never returned to Japan, but died in Cannes on 14 March 1889. His grave is at the Père Lachaise Cemetery in Paris.

== See also ==
- Franco-Japanese relations
