= Takeda Kōunsai =

Japanese samurai (1803–1865)

- 武田耕雲斎
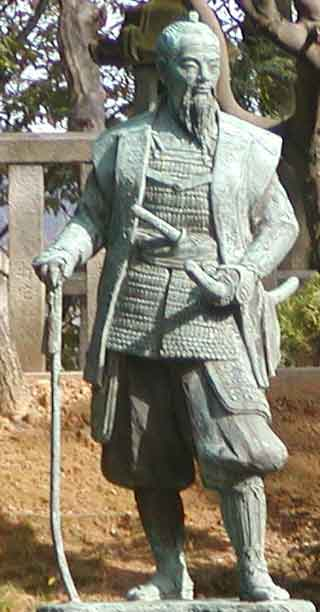
- Takeda Kōunsai statue in Tsuruga
- Born: 1803; Mito Domain, Japan
- Died: March 1, 1865 (aged 61–62); Tsuruga, Fukui, Japan
- Relatives: Hijikata Yoshiatsu (father); Etsu (mother)
- Military career
- Allegiance: Mito Domain
- Conflicts: Mito Rebellion

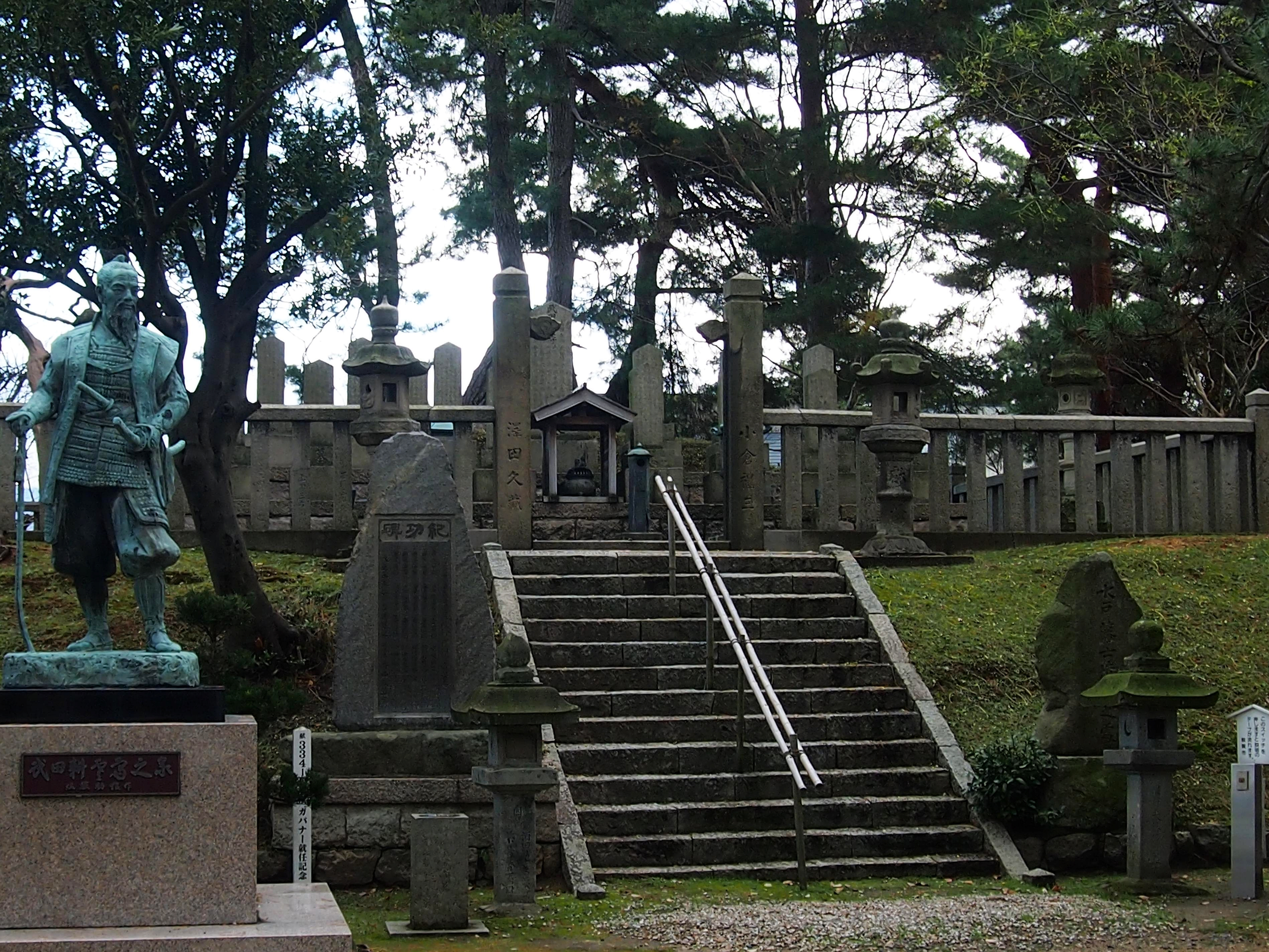
Graves of Takeda Kounsai and Followers

Takeda Kōunsai (武田耕雲斎; 1803 – March 1, 1865) was a Japanese samurai from Mito Domain and councillor to the daimyō of Mito Domain, Tokugawa Nariaki, in Bakumatsu period Japan. He became the leader of the Mito Rebellion and was executed by the Tokugawa shogunate with a large number of his followers shortly before the Meiji Restoration.

== Biography ==
Although Takeda Kōunsai claimed descent from the famous Takeda clan of Kai Province, his immediate ancestor was a Takeda retainer named Atobe Katsusuke, and his claimed connection with the Takeda clan is somewhat tenuous. In 1817, when he inherited his father's 300 koku fief, he changed his surname from Atobe Hikokurō (跡部彦九郎) to Takeda Masaki (武田正生).

As a senior advisor to Tokugawa Nariaki, he helped formulate the reforms to the administration and policies of the Tokugawa shogunate that Nariaki was attempting to promote. These included strengthening the shogunate's military forces and to take aggressive action against the foreign warships encroaching on Japan's territorial waters and threatening its policy of national isolation. However, Nariaki was forced to retire in 1844 by the Tairō Ii Naosuke. Following Ii's assassination in 1860, Nariaki returned to national politics, where he railed against the weak response the shogunate made in response to the Perry Expedition of 1853 and the subsequent signing of the Convention of Kanagawa and the Harris Treaty over the objections of Emperor Kōmei. Takeda Kōunsai emerged during this period as a leader of the increasingly radical pro-sonnō jōi faction within Mito Domain, which started a campaign of terrorist attacks on foreigners residing in Japan and assassination of Japanese officials supporting the shogunate. Events came to a head from May 1864 to early 1865 with the Mito Rebellion, where a force of some 700 Mito samurai armed with firearms and cannon and 1300 partisan insurgents battled an shogunal army of 3000 troops on the slopes of Mount Tsukuba, Nakaminato and other locations in eastern Japan.

Takeda Kōunsai attempted to march directly on Kyoto to appeal to the imperial court, but was captured in Tsuruga with his 823 remaining followers. The rebels were held by the shogunate in 16 herring storehouses by Tsuruga port under very poor conditions in the middle of winter, and many died. The following year, the 353 survivors, including Kōunsai, were taken to the nearby Buddhist temple of Raikō-ji and were executed en masse. Shogunal authorities later arrested and executed his widow, two sons and three grandchildren. When Takeda's 3-year-old son Kaneyoshi (金吾) was to be decapitated, he began crying and clung to his mother. The executioner hesitated and was unable to wield his sword. At that point, the yoriki Shinojima Satarō (篠島 左太郎) offered to assume responsibility, and, holding Kaneyoshi between his knees, stabbed the boy to death with a short sword.

== Grave of Takeda Kōunsai ==
Following the Meiji restoration, the temple of Raikō-ji became a Shinto shrine, Matsubara Jinja, wherein the 411 members of the Mito Rebellion who died in Tsuruga (including those who died in prison) are commemorated as kami. The mass graves of Takeda Kōunsai and his 353 followers were in five mounds within the precincts of the former temple, and the new Meiji government amalgamated the mounds into a single 30 x 4 meter mound, upon which 15 gravestones made from stone from Mito were arranged in a "U"-shape in 1868.

In 1954, in commemoration of the 90th anniversary of the Mito Rebellion, one of the herring storehouses was moved to the grounds of Matsubara Jinja and became the Mito Rebellion Patriots’ Museum (水戸烈士記念館, Mito resshi kinen-kan).

The grave of Takeda Kōunsai and his followers (武田耕雲斎等墓, Takeda Kōunsai tō no haka) is designated as a National Historic Site in 1976.
