= Tōson Shimazaki =

Japanese writer (1872–1943)

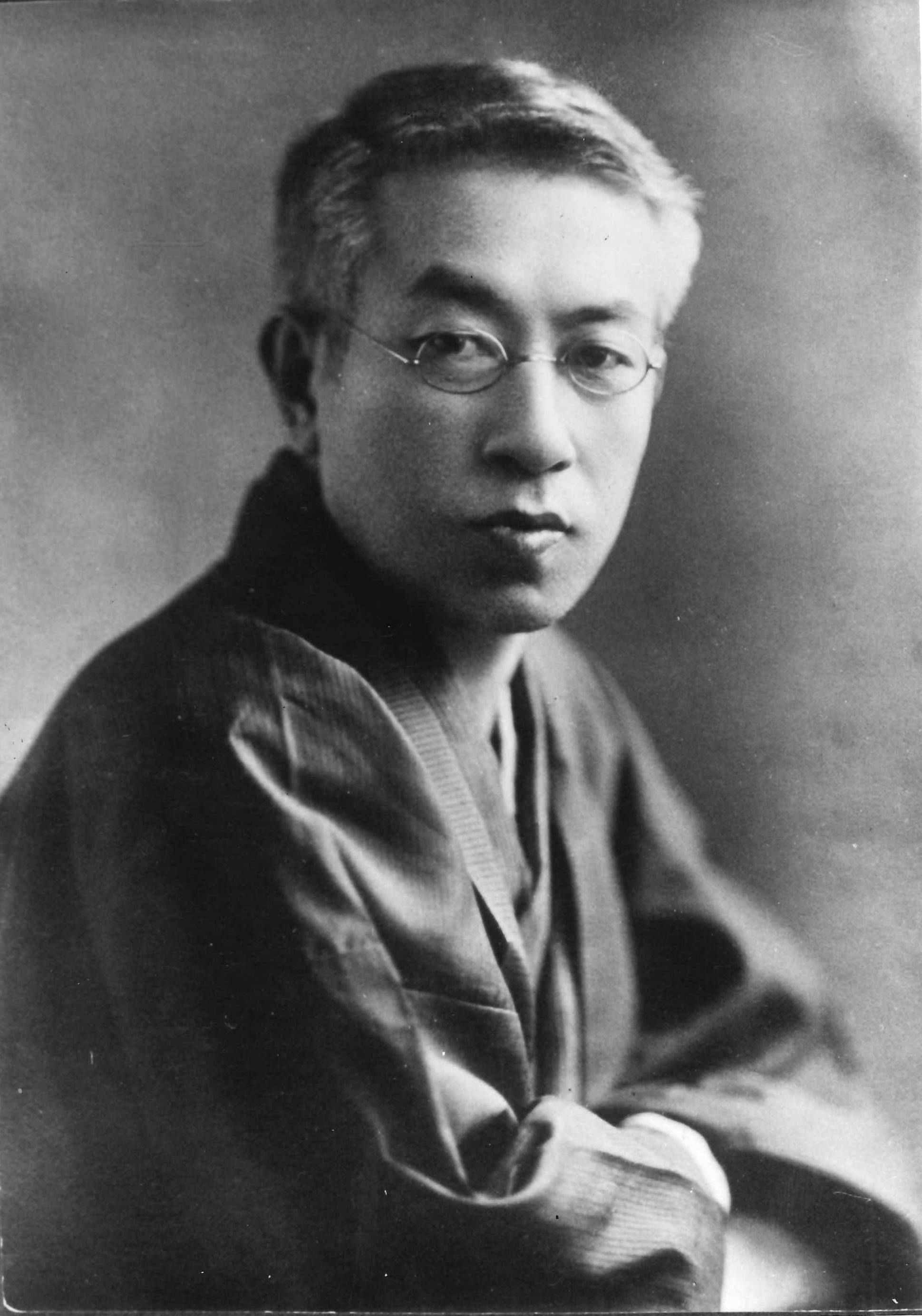
- Born: 25 March 1872; Magome-juku, Nagano Prefecture, Japan
- Died: 22 August 1943 (aged 71); Ōiso, Kanagawa Prefecture, Japan
- Education: Meiji Gakuin University
- Occupation: Writer
- Writing career
- Genres: Poetry, novels
- Notable work: Before the Dawn (1929-1935)
- Movements: Romanticism; Naturalism

Tōson Shimazaki (島崎 藤村, Shimazaki Tōson; Japanese pronunciation: [toꜜː.soɴ], 25 March 1872 – 22 August 1943) was the pen-name of Haruki Shimazaki, a Japanese writer active in the Meiji, Taishō and early Shōwa periods of Japan. He began his career as a Romantic poet, but went on to establish himself as a major proponent of Japanese Naturalism. The historical novel Before the Dawn (1929–1935), about the fall of the Tokugawa shogunate, is his most popular work.

== Early life ==
Shimazaki was born in the old post town of Magome-juku, Nagano Prefecture (now part of Nakatsugawa, Gifu Prefecture), as son of Masaki Shimazaki and his wife Nui. In 1881, he was sent to Tokyo by his father to acquire an education. Masaki, who showed an increasingly eccentric behaviour and suffered from hallucinations, was interned by his family in a self-built cell and died when Shimazaki was only fourteen. Shimazaki's oldest sister Sono Takase also suffered from mental disorders in her late years.

Shimazaki was baptised in 1888 while studying at the Christian Meiji Gakuin University, where he befriended essayists and translators Baba Kochō and Shūkotsu Togawa. He took first steps in writing and contributed to a literary magazine titled Sumire-gusa, until its publication was prohibited by the university's headmaster Yoshiharu Iwamoto. After graduating from Meiji Gakuin in 1891, Shimazaki earned a small salary by contributing translations to Iwamoto's Jogaku zasshi magazine. He began teaching English at the Christian Meiji Women's School (Meiji Jogakkō) the following year, but already left after a few months, partially due to his lack of teaching experience, partially due to his affection for one of his pupils. Around this time, he had his name removed from the register of the Ichibanchō church. He joined a group of writers who founded the literary magazine Bungakukai, to which he contributed his manuscripts. One of Bungakukai's editors, writer Tōkoku Kitamura, whom Shimazaki regarded as his mentor, committed suicide in 1894. Shimazaki, who never completely got over this loss, edited two posthumous collections of Kitamura's works.

In 1896, Shimazaki moved to Sendai in northern Japan to accept a teaching position at Tohoku Gakuin University. His first verse collection, Wakana-shū (lit. "Collection of young herbs", 1897) was published while he was in Sendai. Its success launched him on his future career, and he was regarded as one of the creators of the Meiji Romanticism literary movement. He published more poetry collections, but after the turn of the century he turned his talents to prose fiction. In 1899, he married merchant daughter Fuyuko Hata.

== Literary career ==
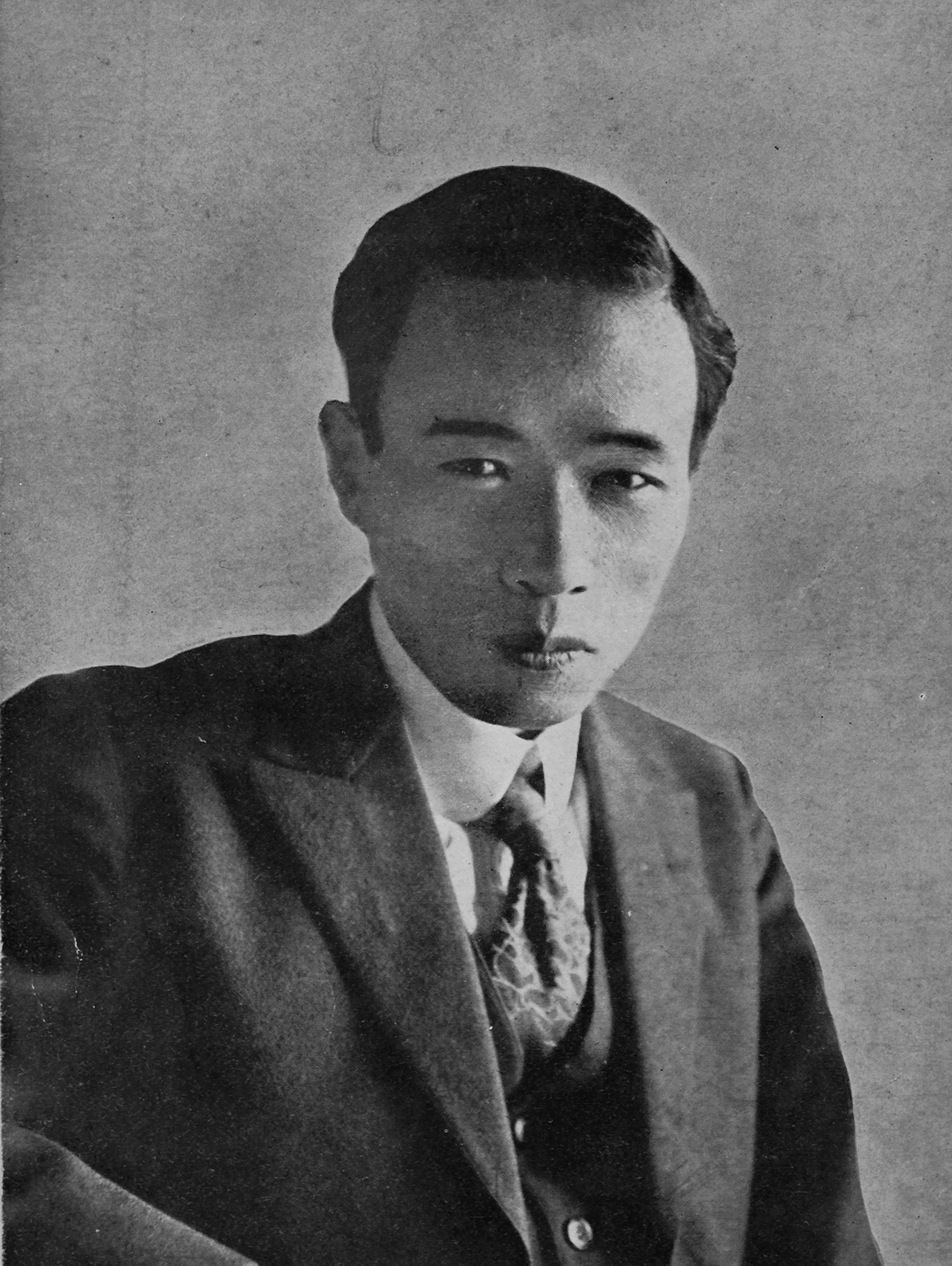
Tōson Shimazaki, ca. 1900

Shimazaki's first novel, The Broken Commandment, appeared self-financed in 1906 and is widely regarded as the first Japanese Naturalist novel. The story follows a burakumin schoolteacher torn between the promise given to his father to keep his outcaste status a secret and his wish to confess his origin to people close to him. While Shimazaki was writing it, his three children died of illness. The deaths have later been ascribed to possible malnutrition as a result of the family's financial constraints at the time of the writing, for which Shimazaki faced harsh criticism, among others from writer Naoya Shiga.

His second novel, Haru ("Spring", 1908), taking its title from the Botticelli painting of the same name, was the first in a series of novels which fictionalised his biography, here the years 1893–1896, reminiscing his life among the young poets of the Romantic movement. Haru was also the first of his works to initially appear in serialised form. Like the preceding and the next novel, Haru was later published in book form in Shimazaki's own Ryokuin sōsho ("Greenshade series"), which he supervised through all production steps, including the books' cover designs.

The Family (1910–1911) depicts the slow decline of two provincial families, the Koizumis and the Hashimotos, between the years 1898 and 1910. Sankichi, the youngest son of the Koizumi family, is the author's alter ego. The novel established Shimazaki's position in Japan's contemporary literary world and has been widely (though not unanimously) regarded by scholars to be his masterpiece. In August 1910, Shimazaki's first wife Fuyuko died shortly after the birth of daughter Ryūko, the fourth surviving child of seven.

In 1913, Shimazaki's niece Komako (daughter of Shimazaki's elder brother Hirosuke, whom he had long supported) became pregnant as a result of the affair between the two. Shimazaki fled to France to avoid the confrontation with his relatives, abandoning the girl, but eventually returned to Japan in 1916. His novel Shinsei ("New life", 1918–1919), an account of his affair with Komako, his stay in France and his eventual return, created a major scandal. Shimazaki was disowned by his brothers Hirosuke (who had tried to keep the affair a secret) and Hideo, and confronted with severe criticism from readers and fellow writers like Ryūnosuke Akutagawa. Shinsei was and is read by scholars in a variety of ways: as art for art's sake, as a confession, as a way to provoke a rupture which he couldn't bring about himself, as a means to get out in the open to preempt circulating rumours. Upon reading the novel, Komako tried to get the family's agreement to marry Shimazaki, but instead the two were ultimately forbidden any further contact.

The alienation between the family members following the publication of Shinsei led to Shimazaki not even being informed of the death of his sister (and closest relative) Sono. He dramatised her last years, which she had spent mostly in medical institutions, in the 1921 novella The Life of a Certain Woman. Arashi ("The tempest", 1926) chronicled his and his four children's lives after the Shinsei scandal.

In 1928, Shimazaki married the more than twenty years younger Shizuko Katō, who had been assisting him on the short-lived feminist journal Shojochi. He published Before the Dawn (1929–1935), a historical novel about the Meiji Restoration from the point of view of a provincial activist in the Kokugaku (Nativism or National Learning) school of Atsutane Hirata. The hero, Aoyama Hanzō, is a thinly veiled representation of Shimazaki's father Masaki. Similarly to the novel The Family, Before the Dawn is regarded as an outstanding effort by Shimazaki by literary scholars and has become his most popular novel. Like the Aoyama family who fell in "Before Dawn", there is a certificate for buying and selling land in Nakatsugawa City that he was in need of poverty in his later years and that he was selling the land and was planning money.

In 1935, Shimazaki became the first president of the newly established Japanese branch of International PEN. In 1936 he traveled to Buenos Aires to represent Japan at the International PEN Club meeting there, also visiting the United States and Europe on this voyage which lasted six months. In his notes, Shimazaki commented both on the West and its feeling of supremacy over the rest of the world, and the danger which lay in his own country's aggressive nationalism: "There is nothing more dangerous than underestimating the developing power of our nation, but at the same time, there is also nothing more dangerous than overestimating that power." The following year, he turned down the invitation to join the recently reorganised Imperial Academy of the Arts (Teikoku Geijutsuin) on the grounds of personal reasons.

In 1943, he began serialising a sequel to Before the Dawn, Tōhō no mon ("The gate to the east"), taking its title from a painting by Pierre Puvis de Chavannes. Only two chapters were finished (with the second one published posthumously), as Shimazaki died of a stroke on the night of 21 to 22 August 1943 at the age of 71. His grave is at the Buddhist temple Jifuku-ji (地福寺) in Ōiso, Kanagawa Prefecture. In 1949, the Toson Memorial Museum was erected in his memory in his hometown Magome-juku.

== Selected works ==
- 1897: Wakana-shū (若菜集, "Collection of young herbs")
- 1906: The Broken Commandment (破戒, Hakai)
- 1908: Haru (春, "Spring")
- 1910–1911: The Family (家, Ie)
- 1918–1919: Shinsei (新生, "New life")
- 1919: Sakura no mi no juku suru toki (桜の実の熟する時, "When the cherries ripen")
- 1921: The Life of a Certain Woman (ある女の生涯, Aru onna no shōgai)
- 1926: Arashi (嵐, "The tempest")
- 1929–1935: Before the Dawn (夜明け前, Yoake mae)
- 1943: Tōhō no Mon (東方の門, "The gate to the east")

== Adaptations ==
A number of Shimazaki's works have been adapted into films, including:

- 1946: Hakai, dir. Yutaka Abe (based on The Broken Commandment)
- 1948: Apostasy, dir. Keisuke Kinoshita (based on The Broken Commandment)
- 1953: Before Dawn, dir. Kōzaburō Yoshimura (based on Before the Dawn)
- 1956: Arashi, dir. Hiroshi Inagaki (based on Arashi)
- 1962: The Outcast, dir. Kon Ichikawa (based on The Broken Commandment)
- 2013: Ie, dir. Masatoshi Akihara (based on The Family)

== Legacy ==
The Tōson Memorial Museum opened in 1952 at his birthplace. Another memorial museum opened in the Komoro Castle site in Komoro, Nagano, in 1958. The house where he spent his last days in Ōiso, Kanagawa, is open to public.
