= Hongaku Shrine =

Shinto shrine in Nagano Prefecture, Japan

Coordinates: 35°34′44.1″N 137°52′25.4″E

Hongaku Shrine 本學神社
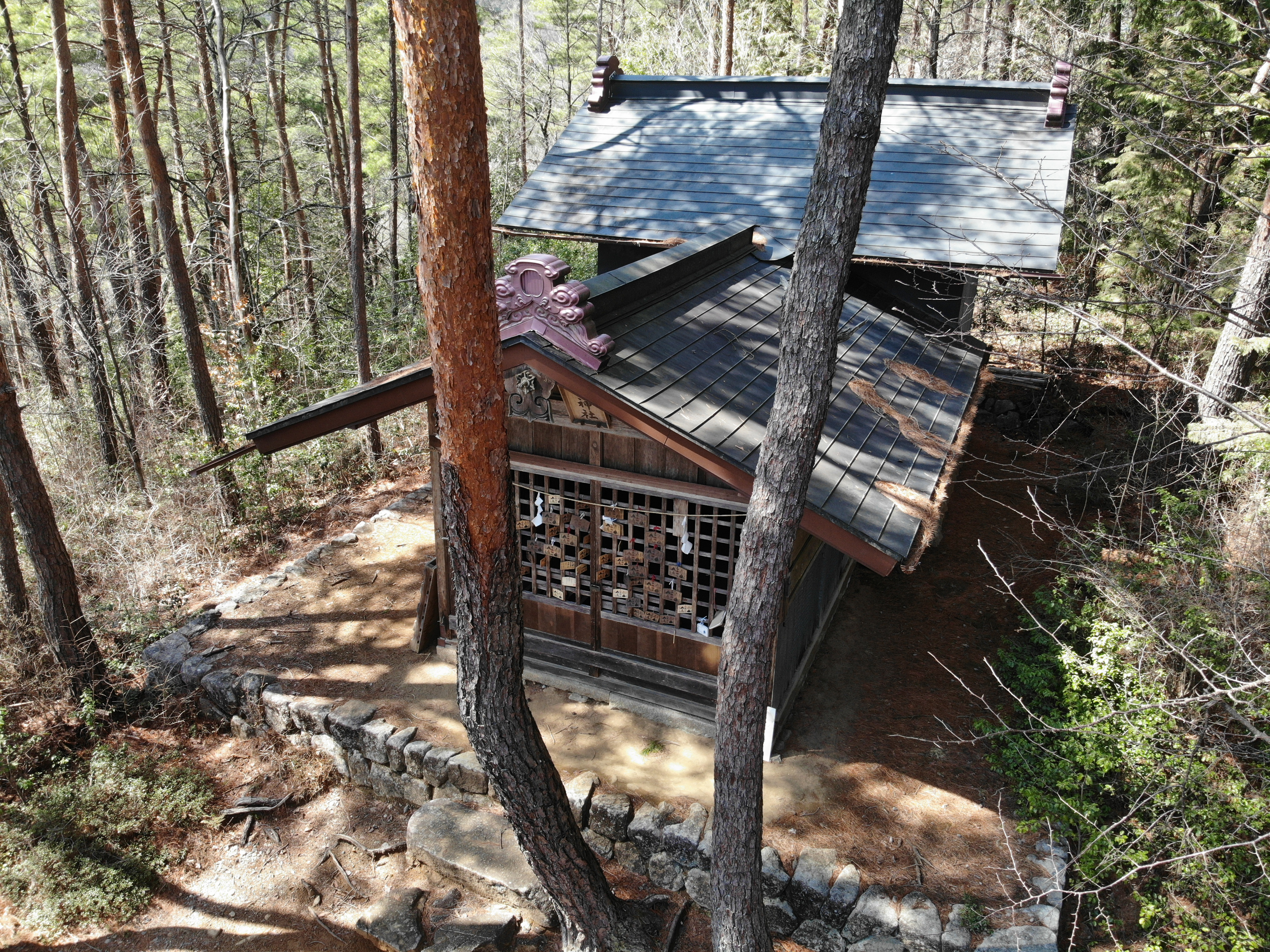
- The haiden of Hongaku Shrine in 2021

- Location within Japan

Religion
- Affiliation: Shintō
- Deity: Kada no Azumamaro; Kamo no Mabuchi; Motoori Norinaga; Hirata Atsutane

Architecture
- Established: 1867; 159 years ago

Hongaku Shrine (本學神社, Hongaku jinja) is a small Shintō shrine in Takamori, Nagano Prefecture, Japan dedicated to the Four Great Men of Kokugaku.

== History ==
During the late Edo period, the Ina Valley of Shinano Province became a stronghold of the nationalist kokugaku movement.

In 1865, Katagiri Harukazu, a local kokugakusha and karō in the service of the Zakōji clan, proposed establishing a shrine to commemorate the four most influential scholars of kokugaku. A remote location at the peak of Mt. Koeda (小枝山) was selected for its commanding view of the Ina Valley. With the cooperation of Hirata Kanetane, Kitahara Inao, and Iwasaki Nagayo, the shrine was founded in 1867.

The Kada, Kamo, Motoori, and Hirata families were solicited for objects from among the belongings left by the four masters to be deposited in the shrine where they would serve as yorishiro. The Kada provided a bronze mirror, the Kamo a tantō, the Motoori a small bronze bell, and the Hirata a number of rare stones including a bead of lapis lazuli and a large phallus described as a "sun-stone" (太陽石). The sun-stone was later removed and is today held by the Takamori Museum of Local History (高森町歴史民俗資料館).

== Bibliography ==
- 寶月 Hōgetsu, 圭吾 Keigo, ed. (1986). 長野県風土記 Nagano-ken fūdoki (in Japanese). Japan: 旺文社 Ōbunsha. ISBN 978-4010502334.
