= Genchū Yoteki =

Edo-period literary commentary

Genchū Yoteki (源註余摘) is a commentary on The Tale of Genji by the Edo period kokugaku scholar Ishikawa Masamochi. It criticizes earlier Edo commentaries by Keichū and others, based on Masamochi's original linguistic scholarship. Its date is unknown, but it took its current form at some point between 1799 and 1830. It is in 54 books (matching the 54 books of Genji), and has been published in various numbers of volumes, most commonly 20.

== Overview ==
Ishikawa Masamochi's commentary on The Tale of Genji, Genchū Yoteki, is in 54 books divided between 20 volumes. The exact date the work was written is uncertain, but it cites Motoori Norinaga's commentary Genji Monogatari Tama no Ogushi, which was published in Kansei 11 (1799), and Masamochi died in Bunsei 13 (1830), so it must have been taken its current form between these dates.

== Background ==
Masamochi's impetus for writing the commentary was to correct what he saw as the errors of Kogetsu-shō, an earlier commentary by Kitamura Kikin.

== Contents ==
A unique feature of Masamochi's commentary is that, in his work to correct the errors of older commentaries, he built on the works of Keichū (Genchū Shūi), Kamo no Mabuchi (Genji Monogatari Shinshaku) and Norinaga (Tama no Ogushi). When accepting or rejecting the theories of these more recent authors, he gave appropriate rationales for his choices. In addition to collecting and commenting on earlier scholars' research, he provides his own original analysis based on copious examples. Much of his commentary focuses on linguistic analysis of individual words based on their usage in multiple texts.

Hiroshi Yoshioka, in his article on the Genchū Yoteki for the Nihon Koten Bungaku Daijiten, praised it as showing a clear critical eye that builds on a broad scholarly basis.

== Textual tradition ==
20-volume editions of the Genchū Yoteki include those in the holdings of the National Diet Library and the University of Tokyo, while Jissen Women's University and the Tokyo Metropolitan Central Library (Ichimura Bunko) have 54-volume editions. There are also other variant copies, such as the ten-volume edition in the Mukyūkai Kannarai Archives (神習文庫).

== Works cited ==
- Yoshioka, Hiroshi (1983). "Genchū Yoteki". Nihon Koten Bungaku Daijiten 日本古典文学大辞典 (in Japanese). Vol. 1. Tokyo: Iwanami Shoten. p. 453. OCLC 11917421.
