= Kojiki Tōsho =

1757 literary commentary by Kamo no Mabuchi

Kojiki Tōsho (古事記頭書) is a three-volume commentary on the Kojiki written by the Edo period kokugaku scholar Kamo no Mabuchi in 1757. It is also known as Kojiki Kōhon (古事記校本). It had an influence on Motoori Norinaga's Kojiki-den. It is not known to survive as a stand-alone work, but its readings were copied into several printed copies of the Kojiki, and an edition of the work that was independently annotated by Norinaga also survives.

== Overview ==
Kojiki Tōsho is a commentary on the Kojiki, an eighth-century work of Shinto historiography and mythology, in three volumes. It was written by the Edo period kokugaku scholar Kamo no Mabuchi. It was completed in the seventh month of Hōreki 7 according to the traditional Japanese calendar (1757 in the Gregorian calendar). It is also known as Kojiki Kōhon.

== Background ==
The preface to the commentary indicates that Mabuchi had fallen ill in the eighth month of 1757 and decided to write a commentary to correct the errors in reading of an earlier commentary, Gōtō Kojiki (鼇頭古事記).

== Contents ==
Kojiki Tōsho is focused primarily on what Mabuchi considered the correct Japanese readings of the classical Chinese text of the Kojiki. It also includes some amount of textual and literary analysis. The commentary is not very detailed, but much of its analysis influenced the later Kojiki-den by Motoori Norinaga, and it is therefore an important work in the history of Kojiki scholarship.

== Textual tradition ==
Norinaga's copy of Kojiki Tōsho, including notes that elaborate on his own ideas, was independently copied and survives in the Cabinet Archives text and others. The text of Mabuchi's commentary was also copied into printed copies of the Kan'ei edition of the Kojiki, such as the Kojiki Kōhon preserved in the Mukyūkai Kannarai Archives (神習文庫). According to Kimihiro Hirano's 1983 article on Kojiki Tōsho for the Nihon Koten Bungaku Daijiten, there are no known copies of the commentary surviving as a stand-alone work.

== Works cited ==
- Hirano, Kimihiro (1983). "Kojiki Tōsho". Nihon Koten Bungaku Daijiten 日本古典文学大辞典 (in Japanese). Vol. 2. Tokyo: Iwanami Shoten. p. 605. OCLC 11917421.
