= Hagiwara Hiromichi =

Japanese literary and philology scholar

Hagiwara Hiromichi (萩原 広道; March 29, 1815 - January 11, 1864) was a scholar of literature, philology, and nativist studies (Kokugaku) as well as an author, translator, and poet active in late-Edo period Japan. He is best known for the innovative commentary and literary analysis of The Tale of Genji (Genji monogatari, ca. 1010) found in his work titled Genji monogatari hyōshaku (源氏物語評釈 An Appraisal of Genji ) published in two installments in 1854 and 1861.

== Life ==
Hiromichi was born on February 19, 1815, in the province of Bizen (what is now the city of Okayama), Japan. He died on December 3, 1863, in Osaka, Japan. (Both dates are according to the lunar calendar used in premodern Japan.) Hiromichi's father, Fujiwara Eizaburō, was a retainer in service to the Okayama feudal lord (daimyō). Hiromichi's name at birth was Fujiwara Keizō 藤原鹿蔵. He adopted the name Hagiwara Hiromichi after relinquishing his status as a samurai and moving to the city of Osaka to pursue a career as a poet and scholar of literature in 1845. He also published works under the literary name (gō) of Nirazono (garlic garden).

Hiromichi’s social status was nominally that of a samurai, but his childhood did not afford the comforts or stability associated with noble birth. Hiromichi’s father, who received only a meager stipend as a retainer, was plagued by ill health. According to his autobiography, Hiromichi was raised largely in the care of his mother and her family and earned the reputation of being a child prodigy by memorizing the entire Ogura Hyakunin isshu (Collection of 100 poems by 100 poets) at the age of 2. Following the death of his mother in 1821 he returned to live with his father who had taken to supporting himself as a teacher of Confucian classics.

Hiromichi’s childhood fascination with the Hyakunin isshu developed into a lifelong interest in poetry and poetic criticism. At the age of thirteen he was introduced to Hiraga Motoyoshi (1800–1865) an established poet and avid student of nativist studies. Hiromichi submitted 450 of his own waka poems to Motoyoshi, asking for corrections and advice. This led to an ongoing exchange concerning both poetry and ideology between the two. Hiromichi's extant poems are not similar to the classical Man'yōshū style poems associated with Motoyoshi, but like Motoyoshi, he expressed deep admiration for the work of the leading nativist scholars of his age such as Kamo no Mabuchi and Motoori Norinaga.

Hiromichi suffered from palsy in middle-age. Health problems diminished his productivity as a calligrapher and author. An acquaintance remarked that despite severe health problems, Hiromichi's devotion to his work remained equal to that of a Buddhist monk. Hiromichi died in Osaka in 1863, without leaving any disciples or heirs. The Meiji author and scholar Mori Ōgai includes the description of a solemn visit to Hiromichi's grave in his literary journal Shigarami zōshi (the weir; 1889–94).

== Works ==
In Osaka Hiromichi taught nativist studies with a focus on classical literature. His poetry and poetic criticism appeared widely in literary publications of the time. He also established an enduring friendship with a fellow Okayama native, Ogata Kōan (1810-1863), who founded the nation’s preeminent school of Dutch Learning (Rangaku) and Western medical techniques in Osaka, known as Tekijuku. Kõan invited Hiromichi to his residence to provide instruction in literary studies. Hiromichi’s interaction with Kōan and the scholars associated with Tekijuku influenced the course of his scholarship, which stands out among works of premodern criticism for its integration of ideas and techniques from both classical studies and the emerging field of Western Learning. Hiromichi’s literary taste ranged from classical poetry to popular fiction written in both vernacular Chinese and Japanese. Following the death of Takizawa Bakin, the most widely read author of fiction of his time, Hiromichi was commissioned to write a concluding volume to Bakin’s unfinished work Daring Adventures of Chivalrous Men (Kaikan kyōki kyōkakuden; 1832–35). Hiromichi's close reading of the popular works of Chinese fiction upon which Bakin based his novel and his own interest in literary structure are evident in the way he successfully emulated both Bakin's literary style and the interpretive comments he includes for readers of the novel. In praising “the acuity of Hiromichi’s command of language and style” the literary critic Kōda Rohan observed that Hiromichi’s concluding volume of Daring Adventures is nearly indistinguishable from the earlier chapters written by the great author himself.

=== Interpreting The Tale of Genji ===
Hiromichi’s ingenuity and sensitivity to literary style found their ultimate expression in his efforts to make the most revered work of the classical canon, The Tale of Genji, accessible to a wider readership. Having successfully lectured on Genji to a popular audience, he began to raise funds to publish a new edition that incorporated interpretation and revised commentary on the original text in 1851. Undaunted by the well-established views of generations of scholars, Hiromichi chose deliberately simple language to turn the world of Genji commentary and criticism on its head. The introduction to his Genji monogatari hyōshaku he explains to readers why this classical text has achieved such renown in the following manner :

The more one reads Genji the more difficult it becomes to express how exceptional it is… The text is remarkably detailed and complete. Put simply, it is written in a way that allows one to scratch in all the places that itch.

Hiromichi focused on textual evidence to substantiate this claim throughout his edition of the text. He argued that the internal consistency of detail and the tale’s unvarnished depiction of human feeling and behavior give the reader a sense that he or she is engaged with a fictional world as real and compelling as a great theatrical production or life itself. To guide inexperienced readers, allowing them to appreciate Genji with the same sense of satisfaction he had discovered after devoting his life to its study, he devised a new interpretive system. He believed that Genji, or any great work of prose fiction, should be valued for its capacity to engage the imagination of readers from all walks of life.

It may seem obvious to contemporary readers that a work of literature should be valued for the ability of its prose to engage the reader’s imagination, but to critics of the Edo period the claims made by Hiromichi were akin to heresy. His immediate predecessors were deeply invested in establishing Genji’s importance in relation to Buddhism, Confucianism, and, ultimately, the superiority of Japan’s indigenous culture (see Kokugaku and Shinto). These interpretive schemes tied the evaluation of Genji as literature to particular moral, ideological, or cultural values. Following in the footsteps of the greatest scholar of nativist studies of the Edo period, Motoori Norinaga (1730-1801), Hiromichi, did much to promote scholarship on Genji. Unlike Norinaga and his influential thesis regarding the affective, or mono no aware oriented approach to reading Genji, however, Hiromichi's interpretation ultimately rested on the internal consistency and literary style of the text, not ideological argument. The first two installments of Hiromichi's commentary were well received and widely reprinted, but only for a brief period. After seeing the publication of the first two volumes of his magnum opus on Genji to print, including the carving of woodblock prints himself, Hiromichi succumbed to protracted illness and died in 1863, leaving his greatest work incomplete. Only five years after Hiromichi’s death, the Tokugawa Shogunate collapsed and the Meiji restoration began. Politicians and academics devoted to modernizing Japan in the Meiji period (1868-1912) sought to revive the nativist rhetoric associated with Genji in the Edo period. Almost immediately, the ideas Hiromichi had used to liberate Genji from the limitations of premodern ideology became a liability while those promoted by Norinaga were easily tailored to serve the needs of scholars and politicians eager to advance both nativism and nationalism. To this day Hiromichi's work remains in the shadow of interpretations that point to Genji as an icon of national culture.

Evidence of Hiromichi's innovative scholarship can be found in Tsubouchi Shōyō's seminal treatise The Essence of the novel (Shōsetsu shinzui, 1885). While Shōyō makes no explicit reference to Hiromichi, his treatise, shows the influence of Hiromichi's theories on Genji, mono no aware, and the elaboration of Bakin's views concerning Edo popular fiction (shōsetsu 小説 ) that appear in texts written by Hiromichi.

== Bibliography ==
- Ashi no ha wake 葦の葉わけ (Collection of comic prose, 1863)
- Genji monogatari hyôshaku: kōsei yakuchū (An Appraisal of Genji, 1854–61)
- Honkyō tei 本教提綱 (also as Hongaku taigai; Presentation of the main teachings, 1846)
- Kogen yakkai 古語訳解 (Dictionary of terms from classical texts, 1848)
- San’yōdō meisho 三陽道名所 (Guide to the San’yô Region; unpublished ms from 1840s)
- Seijū on’yakujiron (Treatise on Methods of Transliteration of Western Weaponry Texts, 1845)
- Tamazasa(Collection of Miscellaneous Writings,1844)
- Te–ni–o–ha keijiben て•に•を•は係辞辨 (A Discourse on Grammar;1846)

== See also ==
- Kokugaku
- Tale of Genji
- Japanese poetry
- Japanese nationalism
