= Isonokami Sasamegoto =

Isonokami Sasamegoto (Japanese: 石上私淑言, lit. 'Personal Views on Poems'), is an extended essay on Tanka poetry written in 1763 by the eighteenth century Japanese scholar Motoori Norinaga. Norinaga was one of the leading scholars in the Kokugaku (国学, lit. 'National learning') literary movement.

== Background ==
Isonokami Sasamegoto was written several years after Norinaga’s early work on poetics, Ashiwake Obune (排蘆小船), expanding the poetic and literary ideas Norinaga introduced in that work. Isonokami Sasamegoto was where Norinaga introduced his theory that mono no aware is the foundation of all the best poetry in the Japanese tradition, going back to ancient times. He argued that mono no aware depicts the true Japanese heart as shown through poetry, as opposed to the “artificially clever hearts” of Chinese poets.

The draft of Isonokami Sasamegoto was finished around 1763, but remained in unpublished manuscript form until it was published in 1816, some fifteen years after Norinaga’s death in 1801.
