= Hayashizaki Bunko =

- 林崎文庫
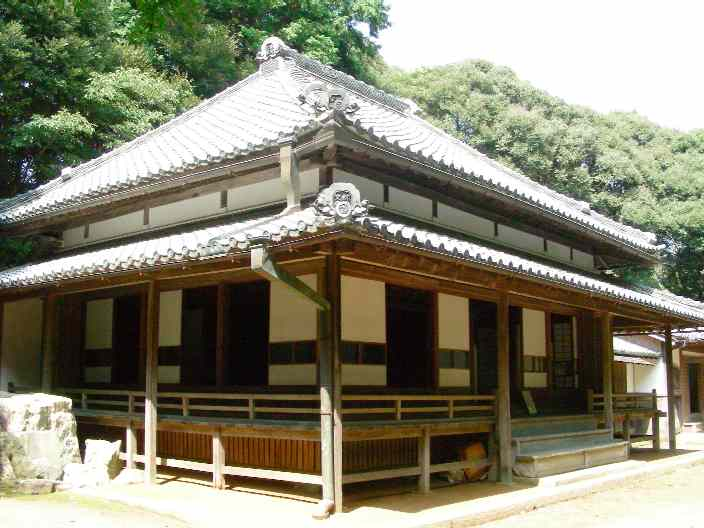
- Hayashizaki Bunko

- Location within Mie Prefecture Location within Japan

General information
- Location: Ise, Mie, Japan, Japan
- Coordinates: 34°27′34″N 136°43′16″E
- Opened: 1690
- National Historic Site of Japan

The Hayashizaki Bunkō (林崎文庫) was a library and academy in the Edo period located in the Ujiimazaikecho neighborhood of the city of Ise, Mie, Japan. It was an important resource for kokugaku scholars in the Bakumatsu period. The building once housing the collection was designated a National Historic Site of Japan in 1954.

== Overview ==
The Hayashizaki Bunko was initially built in 1686 with a donation of 150 Ryō at a location called "Maruyama" at the base of Mount Tsutsumi to house a collection of manuscripts and ancient books from the collection of the Naikū of Ise Grand Shrine. The original site was found to have high humidity and top be prone to flooding, so the collection was relocated to its present location in 1690. The collection was expanded by donations from various noted families in the area. The facilities were expanded in the Tenmei (1781–1789) era by the son-in-law of kokugaku scholar Tanikawa Kotosuga, who added lecture halls for visiting scholars to give presentations. Fellow kokugaku scholar Motoori Norinaga used the collection often for his research, and donated 2,602 works from his own collection to the library. The buildings were repaired in the Bunsei (1818–1830) era. However, the facility relied heavily on support from the Tokugawa shogunate for its expenses, and was abolished after the Meiji restoration. Its collection, which contained 10,978 books at that time, became part of the Jingū Library in 1897.

The building is a two-minute walk from the "Naiku Mae" bus stop on the Mie Kotsu Bus from Iseshi Station on the JR Sangū Line. It is managed by the Ise Grand Shrine, and is open to the public only for a few days each year, during the spring and autumn shrine festivals. At those times, the outside of the building can be viewed from the gardens, but otherwise only the gate can be seen by the public.

== See also ==
- List of Historic Sites of Japan (Mie)
- Toyomiyazaki Bunko
