= Hirata Moritane =

Shinto priest

- 平田 盛胤
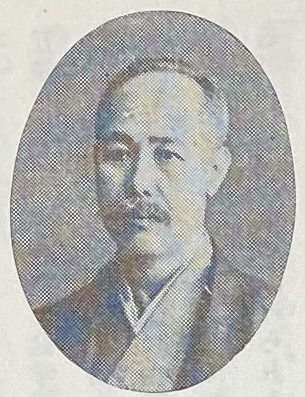

Personal details
- Born: September 26, 1863 Kasamatsu, Mino Province, Japan
- Died: February 28, 1945 (aged 81) Ōyu Village, Akita Prefecture, Japan
- Children: Hirata Munetane (adopted)
- Occupation: Priest
- Known for: 4th head of the Ibukinoya

Hirata Moritane (平田 盛胤; 1863-1945) was a Japanese Shinto priest and scholar of kokugaku. He was one of the heirs of the legacy of Hirata Atsutane, and during his lifetime was considered a leading figure in Tokyo's system of Shinto shrines.

== Biography ==
Hirata was born in the town of Kasamatsu under the name Tozawa Morisada (戸沢 盛定) to the family of samurai Tozawa Moriyasu (戸沢 盛恭), a local magistrate affiliated with the Owari Domain. Around 1886, he was adopted by Hirata Kanetane and changed his name to Moritane.

In 1894, Moritane was appointed high priest of Kanda Shrine in Tokyo. In 1899, he became an administrator of the Office of Japanese Classics Research. During the 1890s, Moritane also cooperated with fellow kokugakusha Hayashi Mikaomi (林 甕臣; 1845-1922) at the latter's private academy in Tokyo where the two taught courses in traditional Japanese writing and stenography.

In 1913, Moritane officiated at the funeral of Tokugawa Yoshinobu. In 1928, when maintenance was carried out on the grave of Taira no Masakado, Moritane was involved in the coinciding ceremonies. One of his students was Miyaji Itsuo, a senior priest of Ise Grand Shrine and official of the Ministry of the Imperial Household. In 1942, the ageing Moritane presided over the state funeral for Japanese military personnel who died at Pearl Harbor.

In 1945, he evacuated along with his adopted son Hirata Munetane to Akita. He died there later that year.
