= Hirata Munetane =

Japanese historian and Shinto priest

- 平田 宗胤

Personal details
- Born: c. 1890 Akita Prefecture, Empire of Japan
- Died: November 7, 1973 Tokyo, Japan
- Occupation: Priest
- Known for: 5th head of the Ibukinoya

Hirata Munetane (平田 宗胤; fl. 1914–1973) was a Japanese historian and Shinto priest. He was the last heir to the Hirata family of kokugaku scholars.

== Biography ==
The exact date of Munetane's birth is unclear. However, he is known to have been writing as early as 1914, when he published an essay on landscape painting for the Akita Sakigake Shimpō. Munetane was the successor of Hirata Moritane, and assumed Moritane's responsibilities as head priest of the Hirata family shrine in Tokyo. During the Second World War, Munetane and Moritane evacuated to Akita in order to escape the American firebombing of Tokyo.

In the period of secularization and Americanization enforced by SCAP after the surrender of Japan, the Hirata family's legacy of nativism made them into objects of public derision. As a result, Munetane withdrew from public life and very little is known of his activities in the immediate post-war years.

Munetane had no children. Bracing for the impending extinction of the Hirata family, he was involved in the re-establishment of the Hirata Shrine in Shibuya, Tokyo which had burnt down during the wartime firebombing to serve as a repository for Hirata family documents after his death.

The plot where the original shrine stood became part of the Tokyo Metro's Koishikawa Depot, and so reconstruction was done at a new site. After the new shrine facilities were finished in the early 1970s, Munetane became head priest. In August 1973, the remaining Hirata family articles held by Munetane were donated to the Hirata Shrine. He died later that year on November 7.

Custodianship of the Hirata shrine was then assumed by the relative of the Hirata family and scholar of classical liberalism Maita Katsuyasu (米田 勝安), also a native of Akita.
