= Toyomiyazaki Bunko =

- 豊宮崎文庫
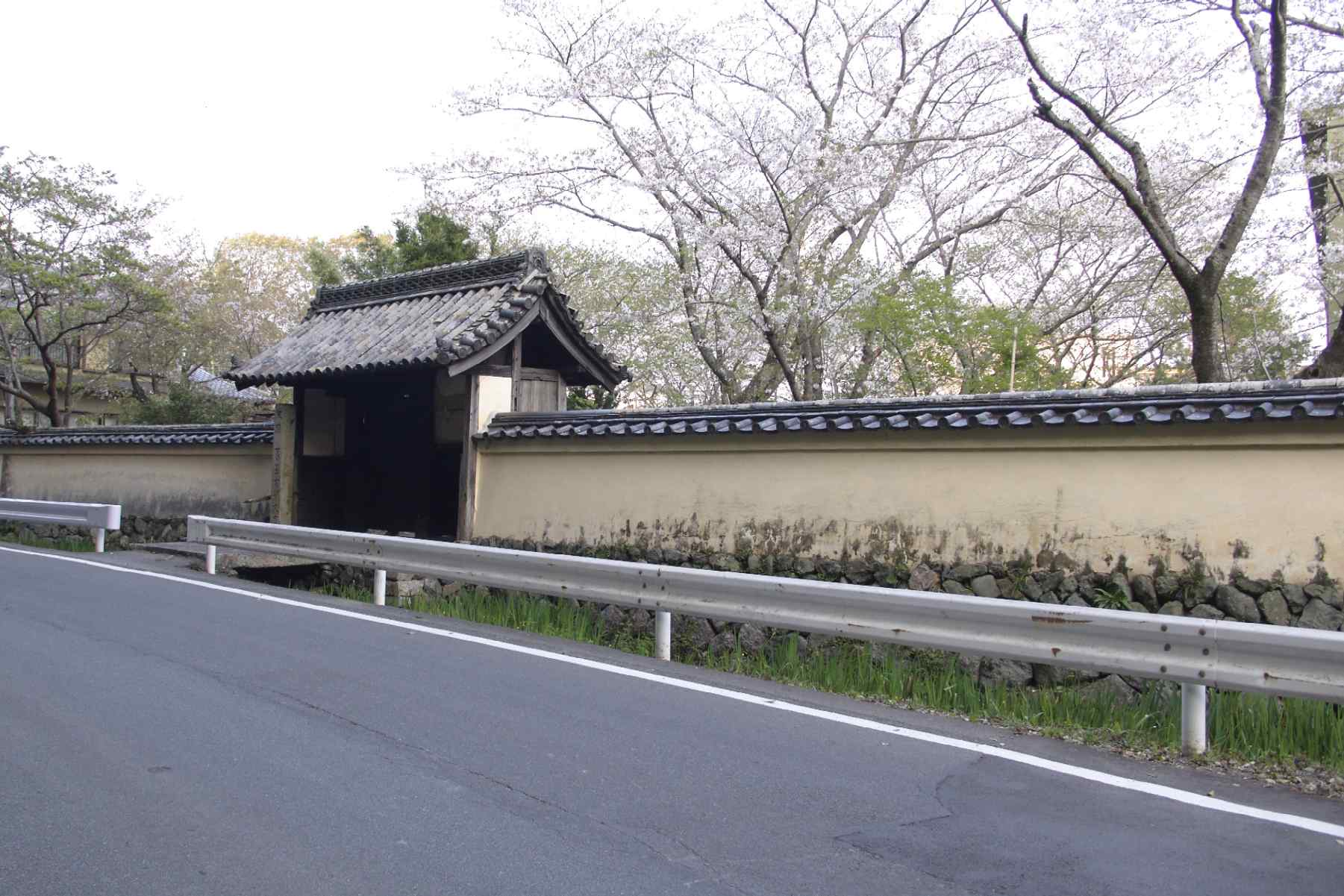
- Toyomiyazaki Bunko

- Location within Mie Prefecture Location within Japan

General information
- Location: Ise, Mie, Japan, Japan
- Coordinates: 34°29′06″N 136°42′32.6″E
- Opened: 1648
- National Historic Site of Japan

The Toyomiyazaki Bunkō (豊宮崎文庫) was a library and academy in the Edo period located in the Okamoto neighborhood of the city of Ise, Mie, Japan. It was an important resource for kokugaku scholars in the Bakumatsu period. Along with the Kanazawa Bunko and Ashikaga Bunko, it was one of the largest and most important collections in pre-modern Japan. The building once housing the collection was designated a National Historic Site of Japan in 1923.

== Overview ==
The Toyomiyazaki Bunko was located to the south of Ise city and east of the Gekū (Outer Shrine) of the Ise Grand Shrine. There are records that a library existed at the Ise Grand Shrine since at least the Nara period, and was a resource used in the training of Shinto priests. This collection expanded through the Kamakura period to include ancient histories and documents, as well as books imported from China. However, during the Nanboku-chō period, the collection was split between the Naikū and Gekū which were also divided in their support between the Northern Court and the Southern Court. Despite efforts to protect the collections by relocating to other locations, a large part of the collection was destroyed in the conflict, or was dispersed to many private collectors. In the 1640s, one of the priests at the Gekū despaired at poor training priests were receiving and set about to restore the collection through donations and by copying ancient texts. He formed a lay association of 70 people in 1648 and acquired a building for use as a library, with an attached hall where visiting scholars gave lectures on a monthly basis. When word of this spread, the new library began to receive donations from Kii Domain, Matsue Domain, Mito Domain and others, including some texts owned by the noted scholar Hayashi Razan. Three of the founders received court ranks from Emperor Go-Kōmyō.

The library received an initial stipend of 200 koku from the Tokugawa shogunate, of which 20 koku was used to buy rice land to provide revenue for ongoing maintenance of the facilities. The library's charter specially forbid additional rice land purchases, but stated that funds should go primarily to the purchase of books, or the copying of texts which could not be acquired through donation or purchase. Enrollment was organized into an annual event, and members could borrow up to two works at one time, for a one month period. The books could not be removed from the city limits. Non-members could view works on the premises with permission of the guards.

The library itself was an eight by three bay building, with separate buildings for lectures and for receiving guests, as well as a small shrine dedicated to Sugawara no Michizane. The compound was surrounded by a high earthen wall. The buildings were renovated in 1688, 1782 and in 1815. By the time of the Meiji restoration, it is estimated that the library contained over 20,000 volumes and was a center for Shinto education.

The new Meiji government seized the collection and the buildings of the Toyomiyazaki Bunko were converted into an elementary school and the lecture hall burned down in 1891. The books were entrusted to a ryokan owner in Ujiyamada, but were kept under poor conditions. Over the years, numerous efforts were made by local groups to restore the Toyomiyazaki Bunko, and these efforts came to a head when it was discovered that many of the works had been illegally sold off onto the black market, and that the site of the Toyomiyazaki Bunko had been sold off to private developers. The association to restore Toyomiyazaki Bunko managed to purchase back the site, as well as more than 18,000 books of then collection. The books were given to the Jingū Library in 1897, and the land with its surviving buildings became a National Historic Site in 1923. The only original structures remaining are the tile-roofed front gate, and a part of the outer wall of the complex. The complete scale of the site is unknown, as only a portion of the land could be bought back by the association.

The site is a seven-minute walk from Iseshi Station on the JR Sangū Line.

== See also ==
- List of Historic Sites of Japan (Mie)
- Hayashizaki Bunko
