= Isagiyosa =

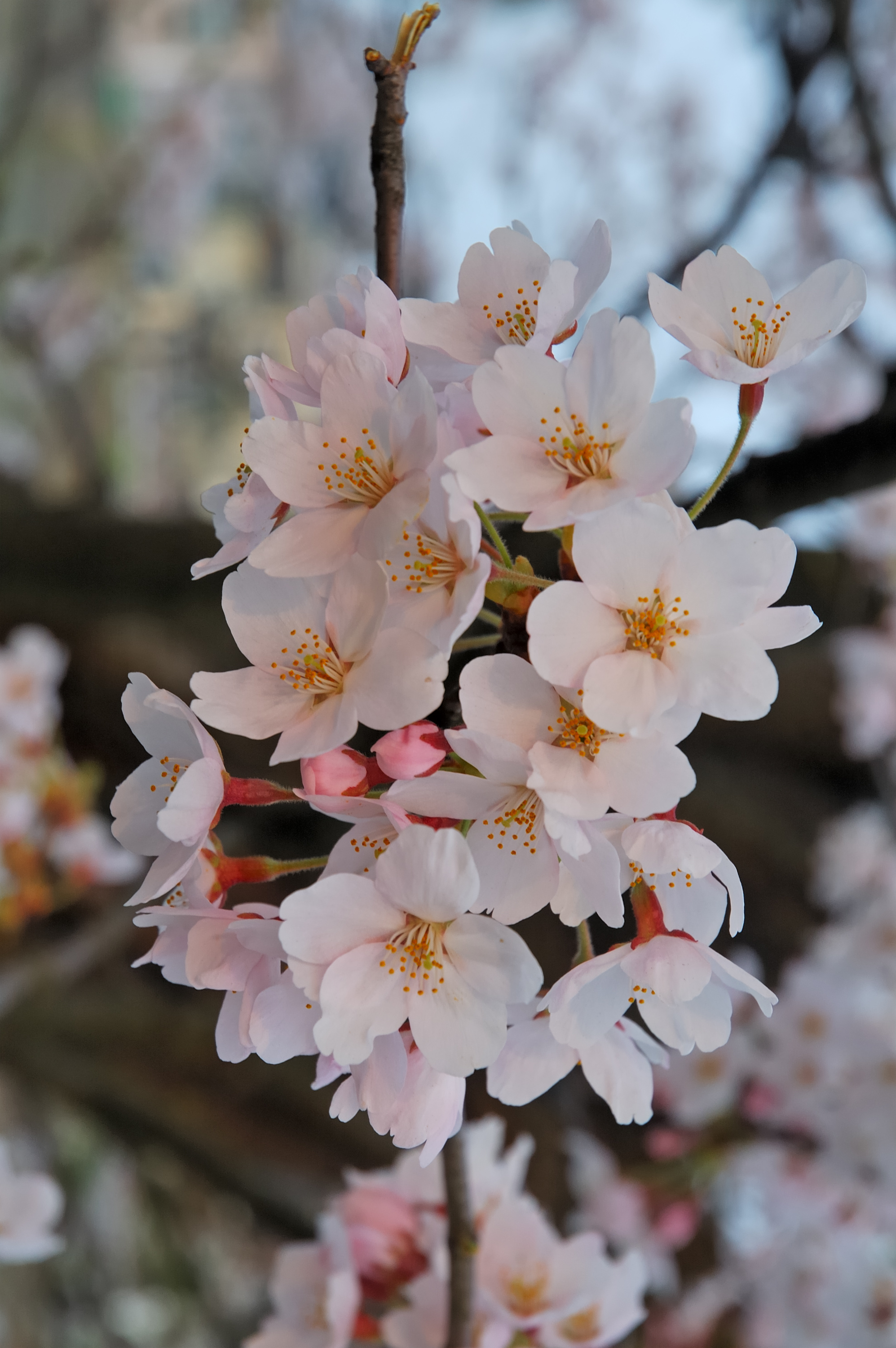
Cherry blossoms are a symbol of isagiyosa in the sense of embracing the transience of the world.

In Japanese society, particularly in historical feudal Japan, isagiyosa (潔さ, "purity") is a virtue, translated with "resolute composure" or "manliness". Able to be interpreted as "grace with pride", isagiyosa is the capability of accepting death with composure and equanimity. It stands besides other central virtues such as public-spiritedness (kō no seishin), loyalty (seijitsusa), diligence (kinbensa), and steadiness (jimichisa).

Cherry blossoms, because of their ephemeral nature, are a symbol of isagiyosa in the sense of embracing the transience of the world. Honda (2001) maintains that these virtues are not Japanese in particular but form a moral code common to all Asian agricultural societies.

== See also ==
- Mono no aware
