= Ishikawa Masamochi =

Japanese poet, writer and scholar from the late Edo period

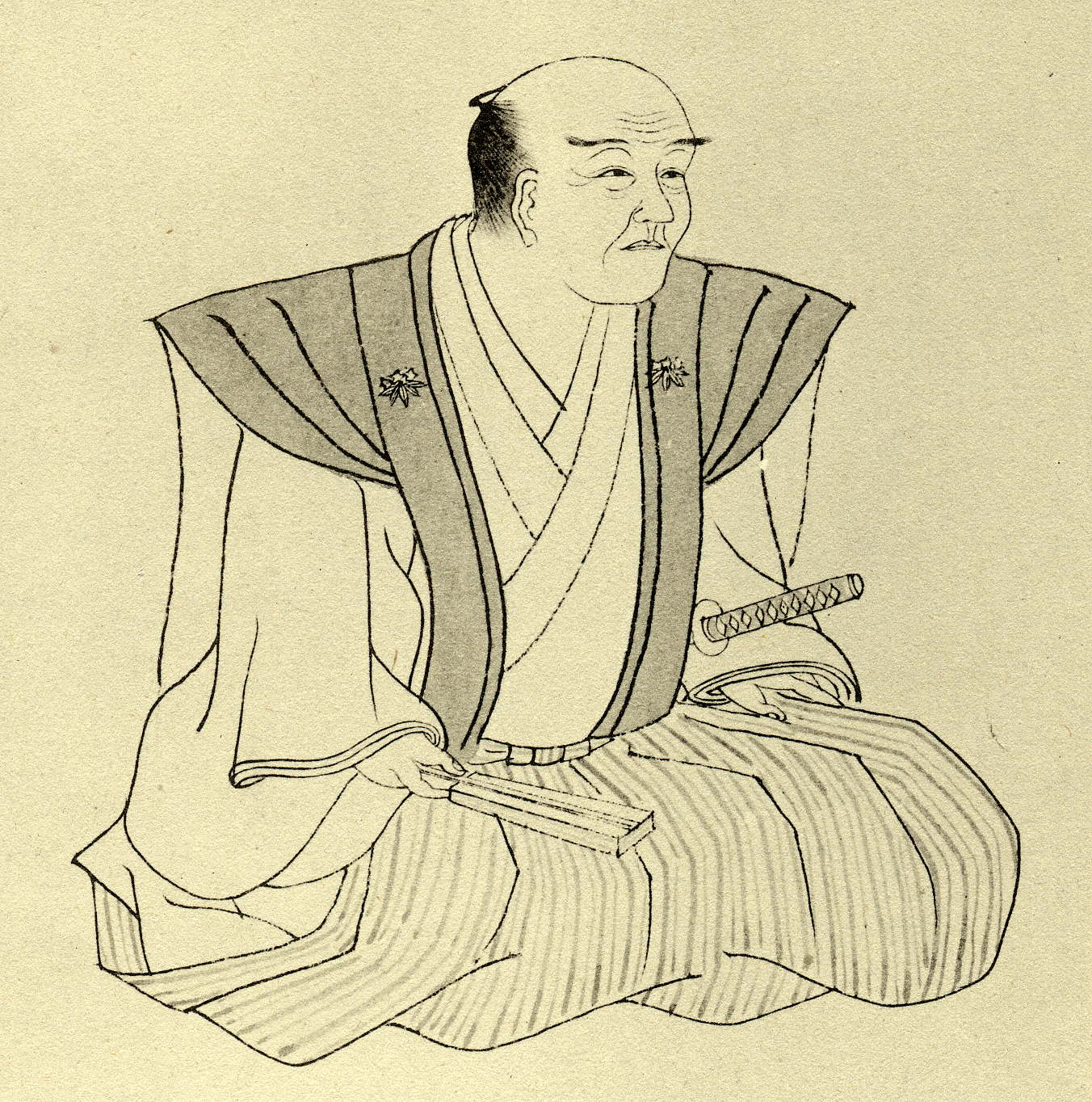
Ishikawa Masamochi

Ishikawa Masamochi (石川 雅望; 1754–1830) was a Japanese kokugaku scholar, kyōka poet and writer of yomihon of the late Edo period.

== Biography ==
Ishikawa Masamochi was born Nukaya Shichihē. According to the autobiographical Rokujuen Jihitsu Kirekiroku (六樹園自筆忌歴録), he was born on the fourteenth day of the twelfth month of Hōreki 3 according to the traditional Japanese calendar (1753/4 in the Gregorian calendar).

He was the eighth child of the Kodenma-chō, Edo innkeeper Nukaya Shichihē, better known as the ukiyo-e master Ishikawa Toyonobu. His mother was Toyonobu's second wife, the younger sister of his first wife. According to Masamochi's autobiographical Towazu-gatari (とはずがたり), all of the children of his father's first wife died young.

He died on the 24th day of the third month of Bunsei 13 (1830). He was buried in the Kaya-dera (かや寺, official name 正覚寺 Shōkaku-ji) in Asakusa. His grave still exists, but the grave marker was destroyed in a fire.

== Names ==
Masamochi's real birth name was Nukaya Shichihē (糠谷七兵衛). In his childhood he was known by the name Kiyonosuke (清之助). He changed his name to Ishikawa Gorobē (石川五郎兵衛) at one point.

His courtesy name was Shisō (子相). His kyōmei (狂名, kyōka pen name) was Yadoya Meshimori (宿屋飯盛), a reference to his family business as innkeepers (宿屋 yadoya). He used numerous art names, including Rokujuen (六樹園), Gorō Sannin (五老山人), Gyakuryo Shujin (逆旅主人) and Gajutsusai (蛾術斎).

His posthumous dharma name is Rokuju-in Daiyo Gorō Kyoshi (六樹院台誉五老居士).

== Writings ==
=== Scholarly works ===
Perhaps because of his father's connections in the world of art and culture, Masamochi first began his Japanese studies under Tsumura Sōan and Chinese studies (kangaku) under Furuya Sekiyō (古屋昔陽).

As a kokugaku scholar, his main research interest was The Tale of Genji, on which he regularly lectured. These lectures formed the basis of his commentary, Genchū Yoteki, and his gago (雅語, "elegant language") dictionary Gagen Shūran (雅言集覧).

=== Poetry ===
He first took up kyōka composition under Tsumuri no Hikaru, but in 1783 became a disciple of Yomo no Akara. The same year, his kyōka appeared in Kyōka-shi Saiken (狂歌師細見; ed. Hezutsu Tōsaku) as those of a disciple of Fuguri Tsurikata (普栗釣方), and in Kyōka Shittariburi (狂歌知足振) as those of a disciple of Yomo no Akara.

== Works cited ==
- Kasuya, Hiroki (1983). "Ishikawa Masamochi". Nihon Koten Bungaku Daijiten 日本古典文学大辞典 (in Japanese). Vol. 1. Tokyo: Iwanami Shoten. pp. 130–131. OCLC 11917421.
