= Magokoro =

Principle in Japanese philosophy

Magokoro (真心), (まごころ) also sometimes archaically rendered as makokoro (まこころ) without the "impurity" of rendaku, is a principle known in Japanese kokugaku related in particular to the origin of the country, the Yamato-damashii (大和魂).

It has also been described in Japanese literature. Motoori Norinaga (1730–1801) devoted about 35 years of his life to the elaboration of a Commentary (Kojiki-den), which is still authoritative today. Each man, writes Motoori, possesses at his birth a "true heart" a "magokoro" (the term magokokoro is itself almost an onomatopoeia since kokoro, the heart, expresses these "beats of the heart") whose ancient Japanese literature is the most faithful expression.

The poetry that describes the fluctuating feelings deep within the human heart is exceptionally intuitive. Its most sublime element, the characteristic element of this poetry, is the mono no aware, that is to say, the feeling of sympathy aroused by the sweet melancholy that emanates from things.

This sentiment expresses the Yamato gokoro ("Japanese heart") as opposed to the Kara gokoro ("Chinese [foreign] heart") "superficial level of consciousness, intellectually cunning but full of pretension". Reflection of a happy time when the Way (tao, Michi) merged with the spontaneous expression of human feelings, Japanese literature, or at least the Narrative (Kojiki den), testifies to the superiority of the Yamato gokoro over the Kara gokoro. In Japan, a country created by the gods, the way is neither natural nor artificially instituted by men, it does not belong to the order of nature nor to that of men. It was established by the gods who gave birth to nature and men. It is not an organizing principle of Japan, but the very history of Japan itself.

The will of the gods was fulfilled first through the foundation of the islands, then it was transmitted to the emperors by their divine ancestors whose lineage would never have been interrupted.

The peculiarity of Japan lies, for Motoori, in the acceptance of human feelings which underlie naturally good behavior and make any theory unnecessary.

== See also ==
- Sincerity
- Irrationalism
