= Four Great Men of Kokugaku =

The Four Great Men of Kokugaku (國學の四大人, Kokugaku no shitaijin) are a group of Edo-period Japanese scholars recognized as the most significant figures in the Kokugaku tradition of Japanese philology, religious studies, and philosophy. They are traditionally enumerated as:

- Kada no Azumamaro
- Kamo no Mabuchi
- Motoori Norinaga
- Hirata Atsutane
