= Tenchūgumi incident =

1863-64 anti-shogunate uprising in Yamato Province, Japan

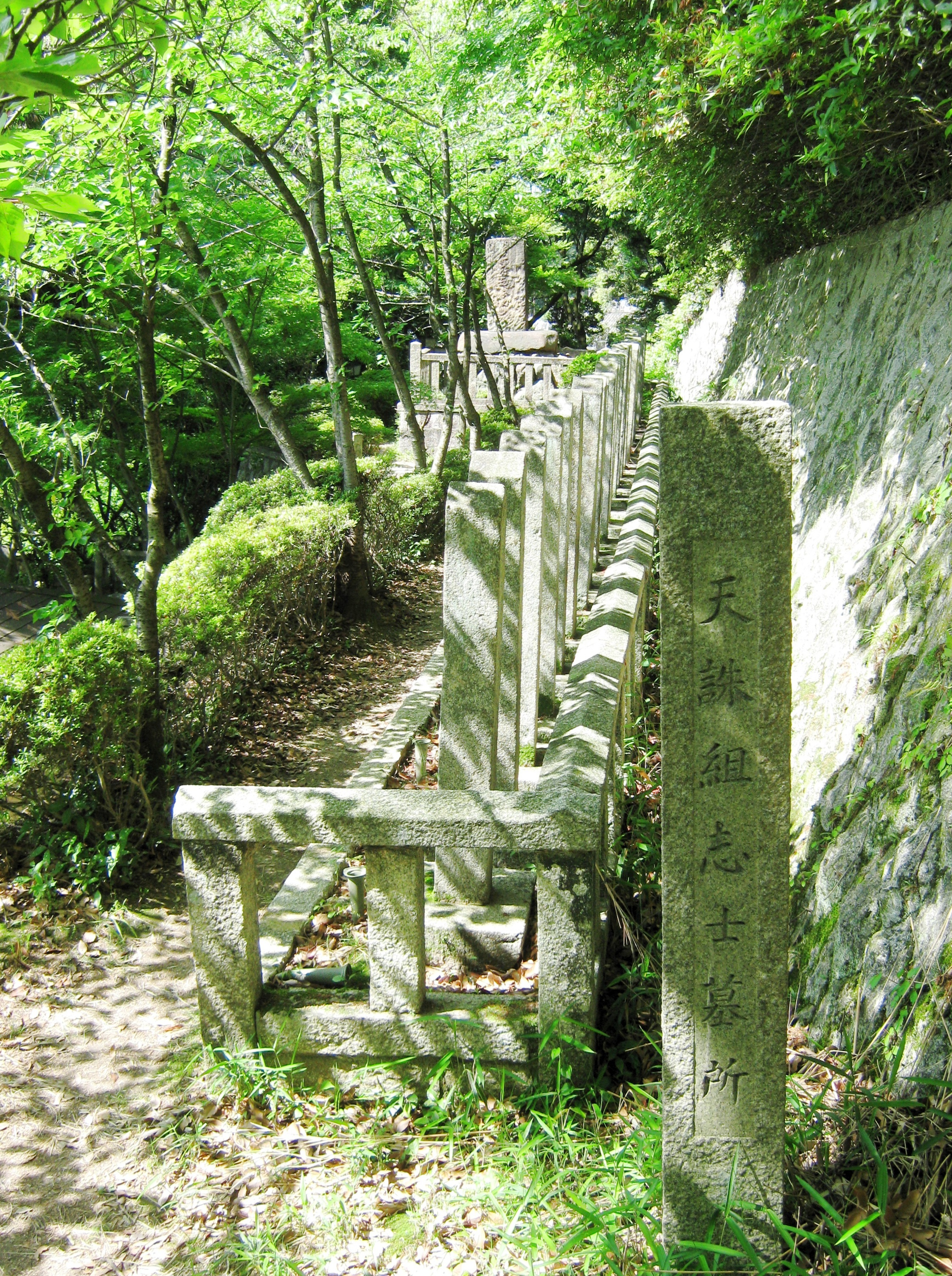
Grave of members of the Tenchūgumi in Kyoto Ryozen Gokoku Shrine

The Tenchūgumi incident (天誅組の変, Tenchūgumi no Hen) was a military uprising of sonnō jōi (revere the Emperor and expel the barbarians) activists in Yamato Province, now Nara Prefecture, on 29 September 1863 (Bunkyū 3/8/17 in the old Japanese calendar), during the Bakumatsu period.

Emperor Kōmei had issued a dispatch to shōgun Tokugawa Iemochi to expel the foreigners from Japan in early 1863. The shōgun answered with a visit to Kyoto in April, but he rejected the demands of the Jōi faction. On September 25 (8/13 in the old Japanese calendar) the emperor announced he would travel to Yamato province, to the grave of Emperor Jimmu, the mythical founder of Japan, to announce his dedication to the Jōi cause.

Following this, a group called Tenchūgumi consisting of 30 samurai and rōnin from Tosa and other fiefs marched into Yamato Province and took over the Magistrate office in Gojō. They were led by Yoshimura Toratarō and Fujimoto Tesseki.

The next day, shogunate loyalists from Satsuma and Aizu reacted by expelling several imperial officials of the sonnō jōi faction from the Imperial Court in Kyoto, in the Bunkyū coup.

The shogunate sent troops to quell the Tenchūgumi, and they were finally defeated in September 1864. Among the rebels who died were Tomobayashi Mitsuhira and Matsumoto Keidō.
