= Keichū =

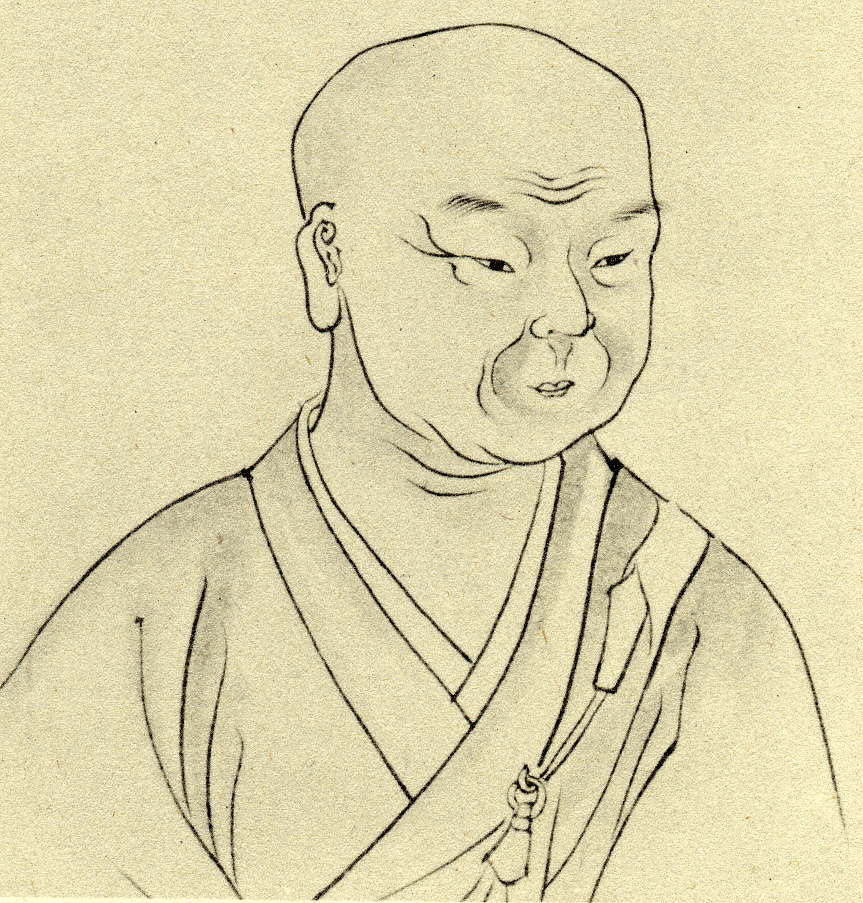
Keichū

Keichū (契沖, Japanese pronunciation: [keꜜi.tɕɯː, keꜜː-], 1640 – April 3, 1701) was a Buddhist priest and a scholar of Kokugaku in the mid Edo period. Keichū's grandfather was a personal retainer of Katō Kiyomasa but his father was a rōnin from the Amagasaki fief. When he was 13, Keichū left home to become an acolyte of the Shingon sect, studying at Kaijō in Myōhōji, Imasato, Osaka. He subsequently attained the post of Ajari (or Azari) at Mount Kōya, and then became chief priest at Mandara-in in Ikutama, Osaka. It was at this time that he became friends with the poet-scholar Shimonokōbe Chōryū (下河辺長流, 1624–1686).

However, he disliked the worldly duties of his work and, after wandering around the Kinki region for a while, made his way back to Mount Kōya. Deeply influenced by the thinking of Kūkai, he also read widely in the Japanese classics under the patronage of Fuseya Shigeta (伏屋重賢), a patron of the arts in Izumi Province. After serving as chief priest at Myōhōji, Keichū spent his last years at Enju’an in Kōzu in the Province of Settsu.

His prolific works set a new standard in the study of the classics, though building on recent revivals of interest in the subject. When the daimyō of Mito, Tokugawa Mitsukuni, decided to sponsor an edition of the Man'yōshū, he commissioned Shimonokōbe Chōryū, heir to the learning of the great poet and Man'yō expert Kinoshita Chōshōshi (木下長嘯子, 1569–1649), to undertake the project. However his dilatory approach, combined with illness, and finally death, impeded his work and the task fell to Keichū, a close friend. The result was the latter's Man'yō Daishōki (万葉集大匠記, 1687–1690), which had a profound effect on kokugaku scholarship. In particular, applied methods borrowed from Chinese Kaozheng philology with rigid empiricism. He used this hermeneutic to philologically critique Buddhism and instead located Shinto as the indigenous Japanese religion.

Similarly his Waji Shōranshō (1693: A Treatise on the Proper way to Write Japanese Words) challenged the standard orthographical conventions set by Fujiwara no Teika and reconstructed distinctions in the old Japanese lexicon based on the earliest texts. In addition to these Keichū wrote the Kōganshō (厚顔抄 1691 A Brazen-faced Treatise, the Kokin Yozaishō, the Seigodan, the Genchū Shūi, and the Hyakunin Isshu Kaikanshō.

== See also ==
- Hirata Atsutane
- Japanese poetry
- Kada no Azumamaro
- Kamo no Mabuchi
- Kaozheng
- Kokugaku
- Motoori Norinaga

== Bibliography ==
- Susan Burns. 2003. Before the Nation. Duke University Press, pp. 49–52.
