= Kada no Azumamaro =

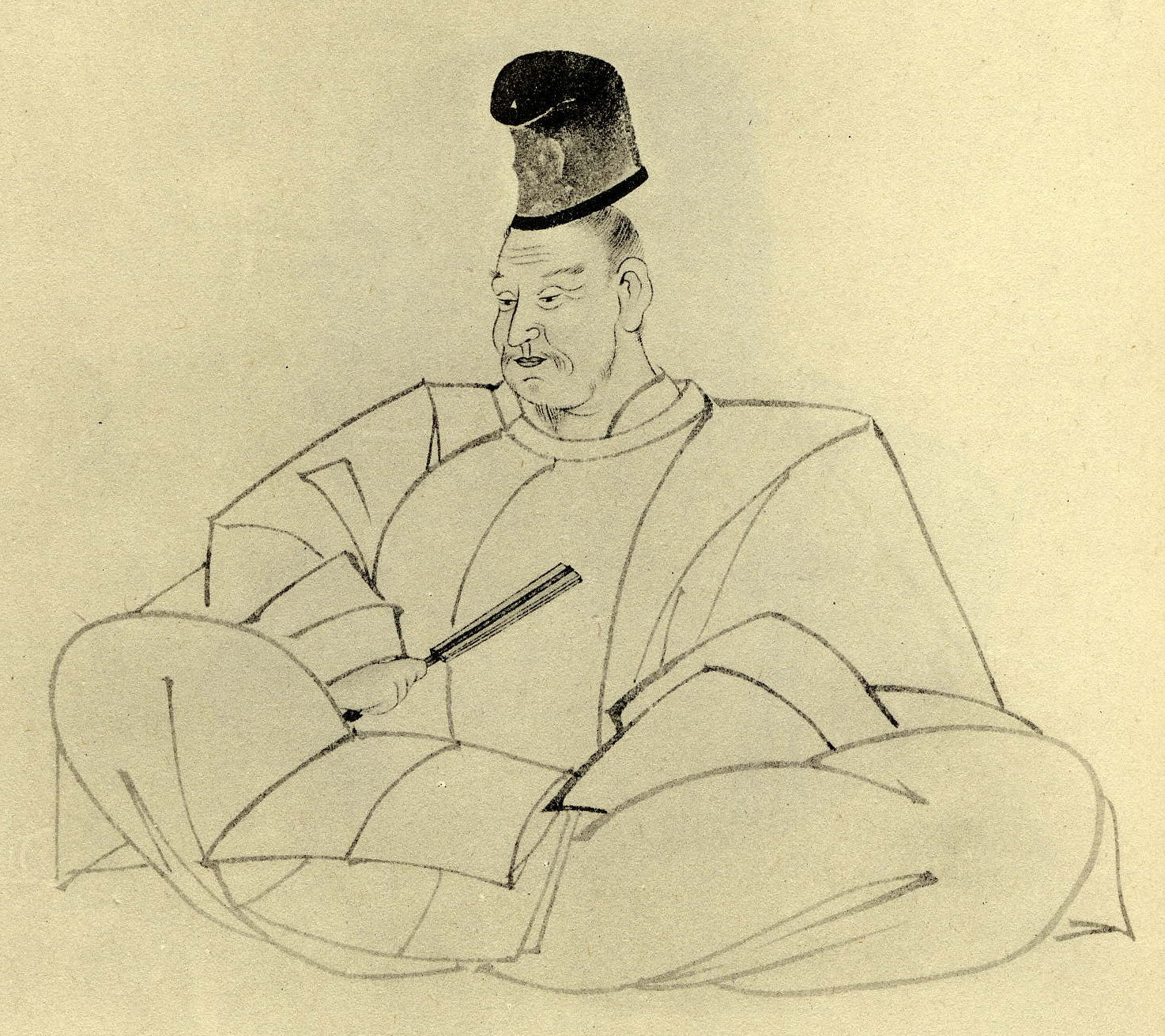
- Kada no Azumamaro
- Born: Haruka Nobumori; February 3, 1669; Fushimi, Kyoto, Yamashiro Province, Japan
- Died: August 8, 1736 (aged 67); Fushimi, Yamashiro Province, Japan

Kada no Azumamaro (荷田 春満; February 3, 1669 – August 8, 1736) was a poet and philologist of the early Edo period. His ideas had a germinal impact on the kokugaku school of nativist studies in Japan. He was commonly known as Hakura Itsuki (羽倉斎宮). His first name was Nobumori (信盛) and later Higashimaru (東丸) . He is considered one of the four great scholars of Japanese classics along with Kamo no Mabuchi, Motoori Norinaga, and Hirata Atsutane.

== Life ==
Azumamaro was born the second son of Hakura Nobuaki (1625-1696), father of a scholarly family that for generations had supplied Shinto priests to the Fushimi Inari-taisha in Fushimi. Fushimi at the time had been described by Ihara Saikaku as an economically depressed town that had fallen down in its fortunes. This marked it off from the flourishing cultural developments of the Genroku period. He set up an academy for studying and teaching his nativist ideas in the Inari shrine. From an early age Azumamaro studied traditional Japanese poetry, waka, and Shinto thought and belief, and his precocity was such that he was soon employed, in 1697, as poetry tutor to Prince Takanobu of Myohoin-gu, the fifth son of Emperor Reigen (regnabat 1663–1687).

In March 1700, he accompanied Tsunemitsu Oinomikado, who was sent to Edo as an imperial envoy, and began to teach the study of poetry and Shintoism. Many of his students came from the Shinto clergy whom he instructed in norito prayers and the Shinto liturgy, though the curriculum also encompassed such ancient texts as the Man'yōshū and the Nihon Shoki. His studies in the former classic profited particularly from the Buddhist priest Keichū, and together these two figures may be considered as founding fathers of the movement of nativist thought known as kokugaku ("national studies").

Azumamaro remained in Edo until April 1713, when he returned briefly to Fushimi, returning to Edo in October of the same year, for a one-year period on a stipend. He was offered a position with the Makino clan of Nagaoka Domain, but declined and retired to pursue his work in his native Fushimi and to support his aging mother. He was frequently consulted by members of the Tokugawa shogunate regarding antiquarian matters pertaining ancient court ceremonies and customs. After his mother's death in 1722 he returned to Edo. En route, he is recorded as having stopped in what is now Fujinomiya, Shizuoka and to have climbed Mount Fuji. In 1723, he submitted a "Reply to the Questions Asked of the Court" at the command of Shogun Tokugawa Yoshimune and was ordered by Yoshimune to teach Japanese studies to his assistant, Shimoda Shiko. He returned to Fushimi in June of the same year after completing his duties. He frequently responded to Yoshimune's inquiries, but in September 1729, his adopted son, Kata Arimitsu, took over the duties. During this period, he submitted "Sougakkou Kei" to Yoshimune, which stated the need to build a school for national studies. n 1726 he suffered from chest pains, and in 1730 he suffered from a stroke,[2] and died in 1736 at the age of 68.

Azumamaro developed an approach which drew a clear distinction between what was considered the native tradition of Japan from the prevalent socio-political orthodoxy of his day, Confucianism, but also sought to disentangle Japanese religion from the other major form of foreign thought, Buddhism. He regarded these foreign systems of belief and thought in adversarial terms. Many of his writings were left incomplete, as he died midway through. His main works include "Man'yoshu Hen'ansho," "Shunyoshu," "Sogakkokei," and "Ise Monogatari Dojimon"

Kamo no Mabuchi, likewise the son of a Shinto priest and, like Azumamaro not of samurai origins, who was to become a major scholar of ancient literature, first met Azumamaro in 1722, and subsequently enrolled to study under him in 1728, and moving to Kyoto in 1733 to be taught by Azumamaro on a more permanent basis.

== Reputation ==
Within a century of his passing, Hirata Atsutane described Kada no Azumamaro as the first of Kokugaku's 'great men' (taijin/ushi). Kokugaku, together with the kogaku (古学: "Ancient Studies") school founded by Kamo no Mabuchi laid the foundations for both the renaissance of interest in Japanese classical poetry and culture, and for the nativist critique of Confucian ideology which was to prove of great ideological importance during and after the transformation of Tokugawa Japan into the modernizing nation of that country under Emperor Meiji .

== Kada no Azumamaro former residence ==
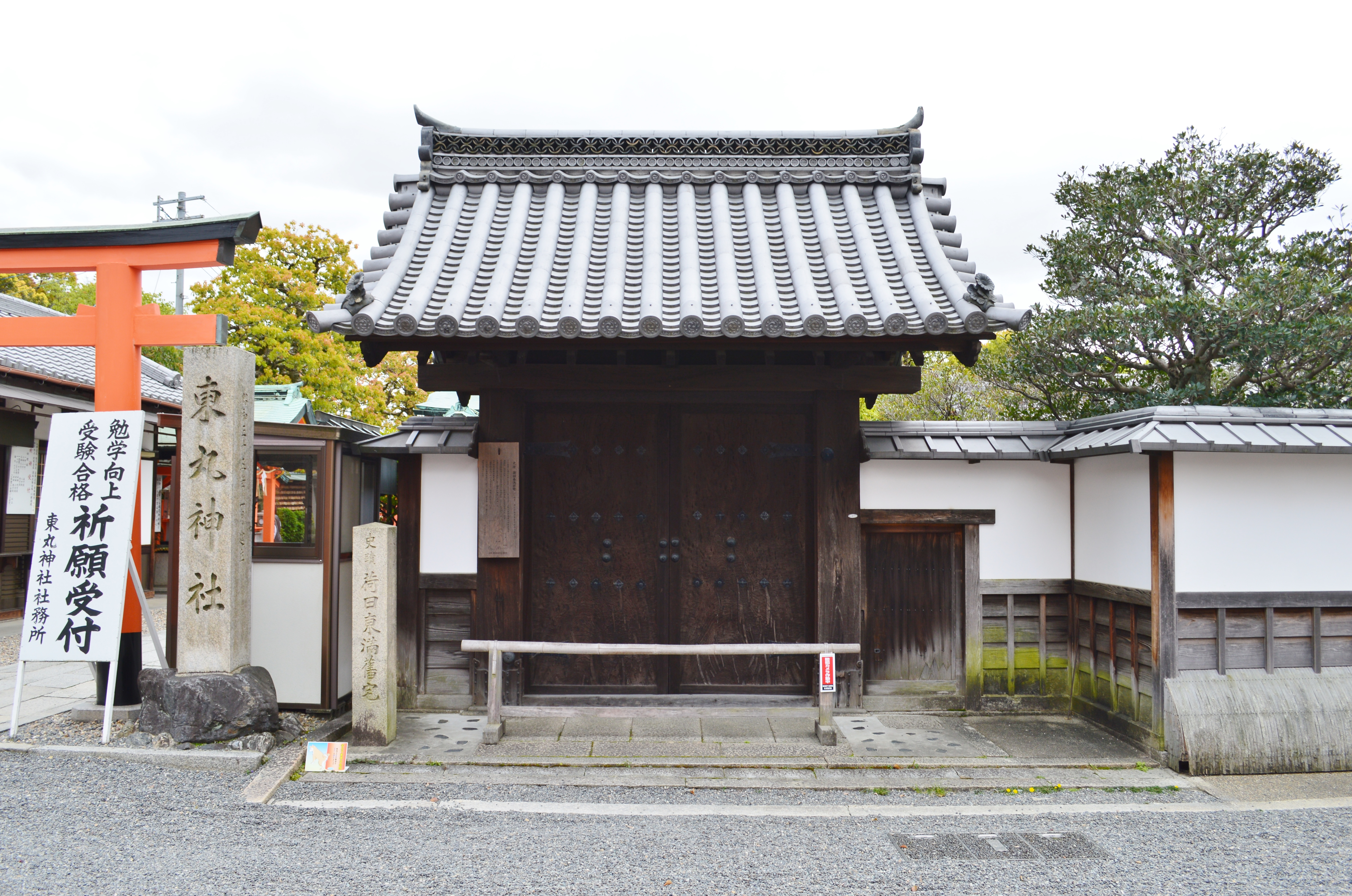
former house of Kada no Azumamaro

The house where Azumamaro was born and where he lived in Fukakusa Yabunouchi-cho, Fushimi, Kyoto still exists. It is located south of Fushimi Inari-taisha and at the back of the Azumamaru Shrine. This one-story house with a shoin-style study partially burned down after Azumamaro's death, but the shoin, ritual vessel storehouse, garden and other remains from that time are well preserved. It was designated as a National Historic Site in 1922. It is about a five-minute walk from Fushimi Inari Station on the Keihan Main Line of the Keihan Electric Railway.

== See also ==
- Japanese nationalism
- Kokugaku
- Motoori Norinaga
- Hirata Atsutane

== Notes and references ==
=== References ===
- Batten, Bruce L. (2003). To the Ends of Japan: Premodern Frontiers, Boundaries, and Interactions. University of Hawaii Press. ISBN 978-0-824-82447-1.
- Flueckiger, Peter (2010). Imagining Harmony: Poetry, Empathy, and Community in Mid-Tokugawa Confucianism and Nativism. Stanford University Press. ISBN 978-0-804-77639-4.
- Nosco, Peter (1990). Remembering Paradise: Nativism and Nostalgia in Eighteenth-century Japan. Harvard University Asia Center. ISBN 978-0-674-76007-3.
