= Motoori Haruniwa =

Japanese scholar and linguistic student

Motoori Haruniwa (本居 春庭; March 17, 1763 - December 13, 1828) was a scholar of Kokugaku, and student of the Japanese language. He was a first son of Motoori Norinaga. He was called Kenzo (健蔵) in childhood.

== Life ==
Haruniwa followed his father and studied the Japanese language from childhood. His father, Norinaga made Haruniwa copy literature of antiquity. Haruniwa wrote down what his father lectured by oral. He contracted an eye disease from August 1791, eventually going blind in 1795. His disease is supposed to be an Uveitis by Adachi Kenichi (足立巻一, a student of Haruniwa.). Haruniwa transferred a Katoku (家督, patria potestas of Japan) of Motoori house to Motoori Ōhira, who was an adoptive son of Motoori Norinaga. Haruniwa continued with his study of the verb and finished his study of conjugation in 1806. He is a pioneer of conjugation study in Japan.

== Works ==
- "Kotoba no Yachimata" : Japanese name (詞八衢) Study of conjugation
- "Kotoba no Kayoiji" : Japanese name (詞通路) Study of an intransitive verb and transitive verb
- "Nochi-Suzunoyasyū" : Japanese name (後鈴屋集) Anthology of Haruniwa's Waka poems

== Bibliography ==
- "Yachimata (やちまた)" by Adachi Ken-ichi (足立巻一)

== See also ==
- List of linguists
