= Kojiki-den =

1790 literary commentary by Motoori Norinaga

The Kojiki-den (古事記伝) is a 44-volume commentary on the Kojiki written by the kokugaku scholar Motoori Norinaga.

== Overview ==
The Kojiki-den is a commentary on the Kojiki, an eighth-century work of Shinto historiography and mythology, by the Edo period kokugaku scholar Motoori Norinaga.

== Background ==
Motoori Norinaga was attracted to Shinto, as well as waka and monogatari, from a young age. While studying in Kyoto in the seventh month of the sixth year of Hōreki (1756), he purchased a copy of the Kan'ei edition of the Kojiki, so it is thought that he read the work shortly after this point. His early writings following this date, such as the 1758 Aware Ben (安波礼弁) and Ashiwake Obune (排蘆小船) were more focused on the Nihon Shoki. In the 1761 Ame Tsuchi no Ben (阿毎菟知弁), he had moved toward placing more value on linguistic scholarship and attacked the Nihon Shoki's Chinese for being a barrier to research into the ancient Japanese language.

== Publication ==
The Kojiki-den was completed in Kansei 10 (1798). It is in 44 books, first published in 44 volumes. The first five books were first printed in 1790, with books 6 through 11 following in 1792. Books 12 through 17 were printed in 1797. The rest of the work was not published until Bunsei 5 (1822), after Norinaga's death. The first editions were printed in Nagoya by Eirakuya Tōshirō (永楽屋東四郎) and others.

== Textual tradition ==
According to the 1983 Nihon Koten Bungaku Daijiten's article on the Kojiki-den, written by Tadashi Ōkubo (1919–1980), Norinaga's original manuscripts for books 17, 18, 19, and 21 through 44 (27 books, 22 volumes), and secondary manuscripts for all 44 books (except for book 3, which is represented by a tertiary manuscript), are in the holdings of the Museum of Motoori Norinaga (本居宣長記念館 Motoori Norinaga Kinenkan). The secondary manuscript for book 3 is in the holdings of the Tenri Central Library.

== Works cited ==
- Ōkubo, Tadashi (1983). "Kojiki-den". Nihon Koten Bungaku Daijiten 日本古典文学大辞典 (in Japanese). Vol. 2. Tokyo: Iwanami Shoten. pp. 603–605. OCLC 11917421.
