= Hirata Kanetane =

Japanese scholar (1799–1880)

- 平田 銕胤

Personal details
- Born: December 31, 1799 Niiya Domain, Iyo Province, Japan
- Died: October 25, 1880 (aged 80)
- Known for: 2nd head of the Ibukinoya

Hirata Kanetane (平田 銕胤; 1799–1880) was a Japanese scholar of kokugaku. He studied under Hirata Atsutane, and later became his adopted son and heir.

== Biography ==
Hirata Kanetane was born under the name Midorikawa Atsuzane (碧川 篤実) as the eldest son of Midorikawa Emonpachi (碧川 衛門八), a retainer of Katō Yasutada, lord of the Niiya Domain. In the summer of 1820, Kanetane came across a number of books by Hirata Atsutane in a bookstore and after reading them decided to devote himself to kokugaku.

In 1822, Kanetane travelled to Edo to enroll in Hirata Atsutane's school of kokugaku, the Ibukinoya. On January 15, 1824, Atsutane formally adopted Kanetane as a mukoyōshi. Kanetane later married Atsutane's daughter, Chie (千枝).

In 1841, Atsutane was barred from publishing and expelled from Edo back to his native Kubota Domain by the shogunate's censors. Kanetane accompanied him to Kubota. Atsutane died soon after in 1843 and the Ibukinoya fully came under Kanetane's leadership. On December 28, 1850, the injunction against the publication of Atsutane's writings was lifted and the Ibukinoya was able to resume public operation.

During the Ansei era, Satake Yoshitaka, lord of the Kubota Domain, commanded Kanetane to use the nationwide network of Hirata disciples to gather and compile information on national affairs. The results of Kanetane's research was compiled under the title Fū'un himitsu tanteiroku. This project is notable for having been an early political use of the power of the kokugaku movement.

In the autumn of 1858, Kanetane sent a letter to Tsuruya Ariyo of the Tsugaru Domain mentioning the recent incursions by the Western powers:

The aforementioned foreign barbarians from America, Russia, and England began arriving one after another and disembarked their ships. At this time, France [also] arrived by ship. [...] Their wishes were met in full, and although it is unknown where they are going, it is fortunate that at least there was no incident. However, since their arrival last month, a terrible epidemic [of cholera] has spread, and the world is in a state of distress and confusion. You may eventually hear in definite terms, but I think the cause is completely the yōmi (妖魅) spirits that accompanied the foreign barbarians ...

After the Boshin War, Kanetane briefly headed the revived Jingikan before its abolition by the progressivist government. His heir Nobutane died in 1872. Kanetane himself died in 1880.
