= Motoori Ōhira =

Japanese scholar of Kokugaku

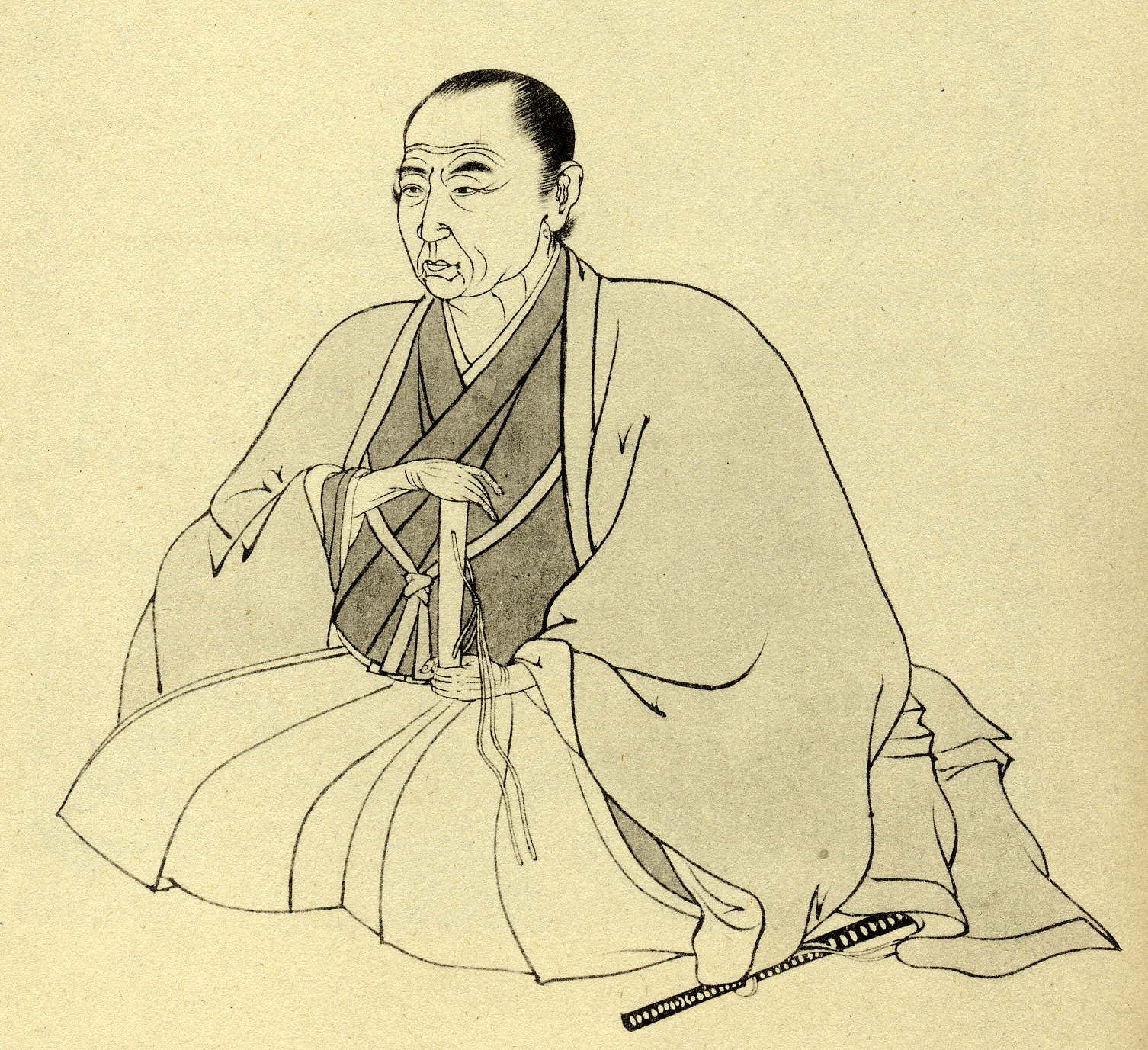
Motoori Ōhira by Japanese book " 国文学名家肖像集".

Motoori Ōhira (本居 大平; March 17, 1756 - October 23, 1833) was a kokugaku scholar and a successor to Motoori Norinaga. He wrote under the pen name Fuji no Kakitsu (藤 垣内).

== Life ==
Ōhira was born in Matsusaka, Ise Province (now Matsusaka, Mie Prefecture) as the eldest son of Inagake Munetaka (稲懸棟隆), a chōnin and pupil of Motoori Norinaga. Ōhira became a pupil of Norinaga's in when he was 13. From early morning to afternoon, he dedicated himself to the family business, and from afternoon to night, he dedicated himself to his studies.

He was adopted by Norinaga in 1799 when he was 43 and became the head of the family estate when Norinaga's biological son, Motoori Haruniwa, lost his sight. He served the Kishū Tokugawa family in various positions, such as lecturer, where he laid the foundations for kokugaku and classical studies establishments.

He had an adopted son, Motoori Uchitō.

== Career ==
After Norinaga's death, Ōhira took over administration of the Suzuya School (鈴屋派, Suzuya-ha). The Suzuya School was a private school with over 500 pupils throughout the country by the time of Norinaga's death and expanded even further once led by Ōhira.

Ōhira continued to work on Norinaga's teachings and defined kodōgaku (古道学; lit. "study of the old way") as the study of classical texts beginning with the Kojiki and Nihon Shoki and in order to achieve “old thought (古の意, inishie no kokoro)” and correctly interpret the meaning of these texts, one must rid oneself of any Chinese thought (漢意, karagokoro). Examples of such Chinese thought he provided were disparaging the emperor by revering Buddhas over kami, or disparaging funerals so that one does not have to feel the sorrow of death. He also criticized the assignment of kokushi from the central government and the decision to ban imperial proclamations, as he claimed these were a result of the harmful impacts of Confucianism. This was a continuation of Norinaga's stance rejecting Chinese thought.

Ōhira continued to work on the teachings of Norinaga in the field of kagaku (歌学; the study of poetry) as well. Norinaga argued Japanese poetry could be divided into two types, classical style (古風, kofū) and what followed (後世風, kōseifū), a stance which Ōhira adopted, leading to debates with fellow kokugaku scholar and poet Harumi Murata.

== Works ==
- Kogaku-yō (古学要; Essentials of Kogaku)
- Tamaboko Hyakushukai (玉鉾百首解; An Analysis of Tamaboko Hyakushu)
- Kagurauta Shinshaku (神楽歌新釈; A New Interpretation of Kagura Songs)
- Yasoura no Tama (八十浦之玉)
- Inabashū (稲葉集; Collection of Rice Plant Leaves; A poetry anthology)

== Bibliography ==
- Tanaka, Kōji (2014). 本居宣長：文学と思想の巨人 [Motoori Norinaga: A Titan of Literature and Philosophy] (in Japanese). Tokyo: Chuokoron-Shinsha. ISBN 978-4-12-102276-9.
