= Tomobayashi Mitsuhira =

Japanese classics scholar and poet (1813–1864)

Tomobayashi Mitsuhira (伴林 光平; 1813 – 1864) was a kokugaku scholar and poet during the late Edo period.

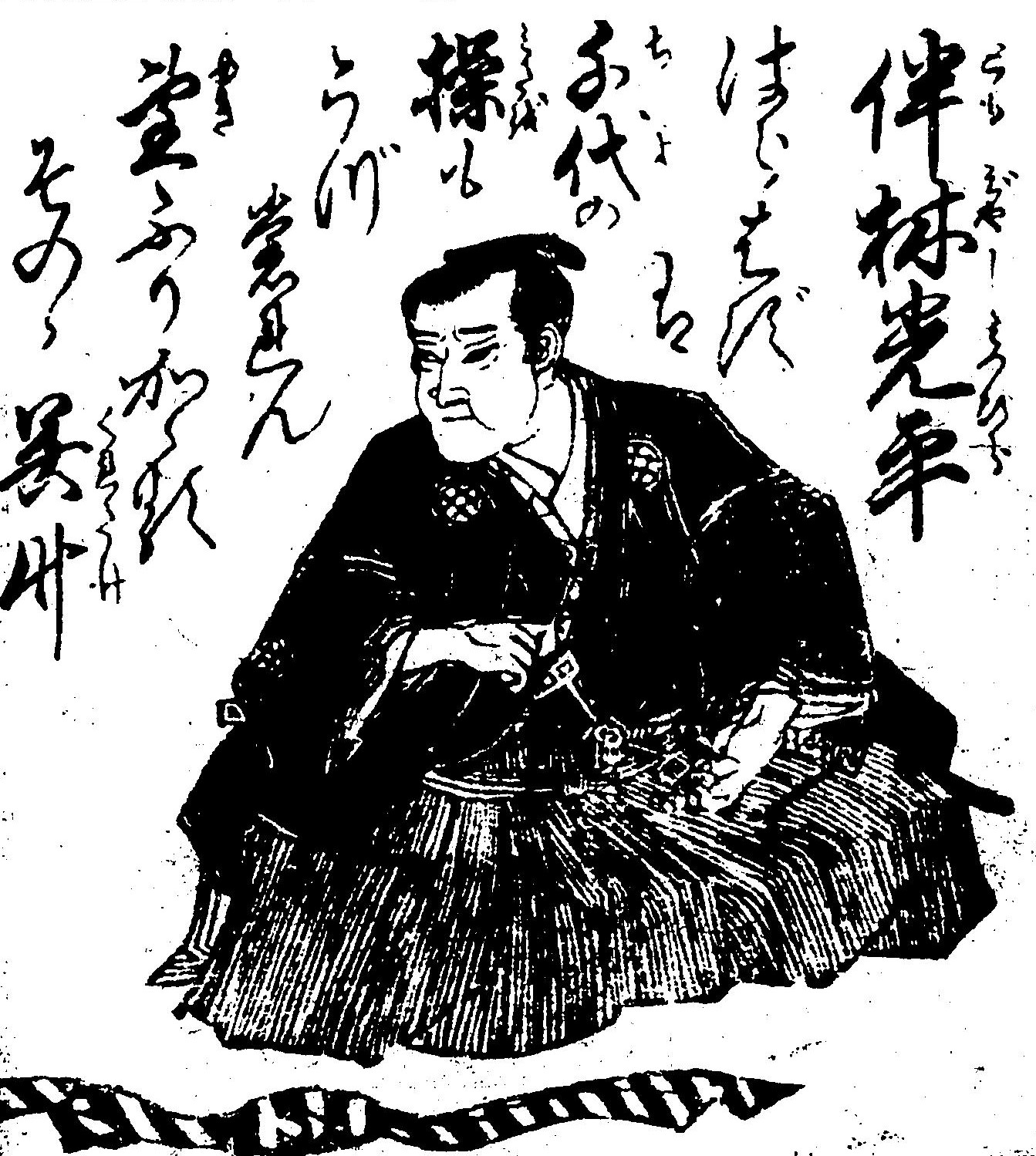
Tomobayashi Mitsuhira
