= Kamo no Mabuchi =

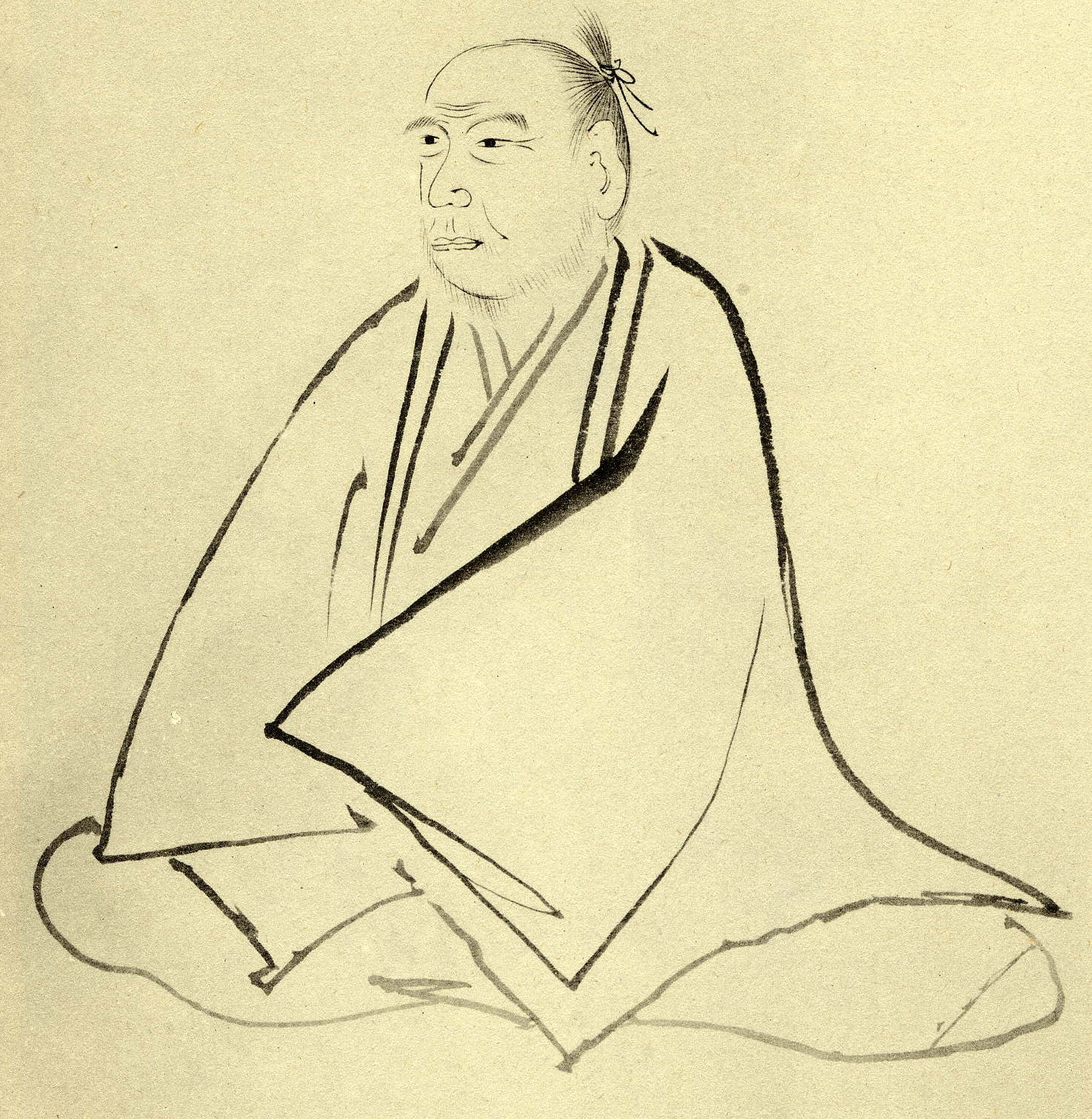
- Mabuchi's portrait by his student
- Born: April 24, 1697; Hamamatsu, Shizuoka, Japan
- Died: November 27, 1769 (aged 72); Edo, Japan

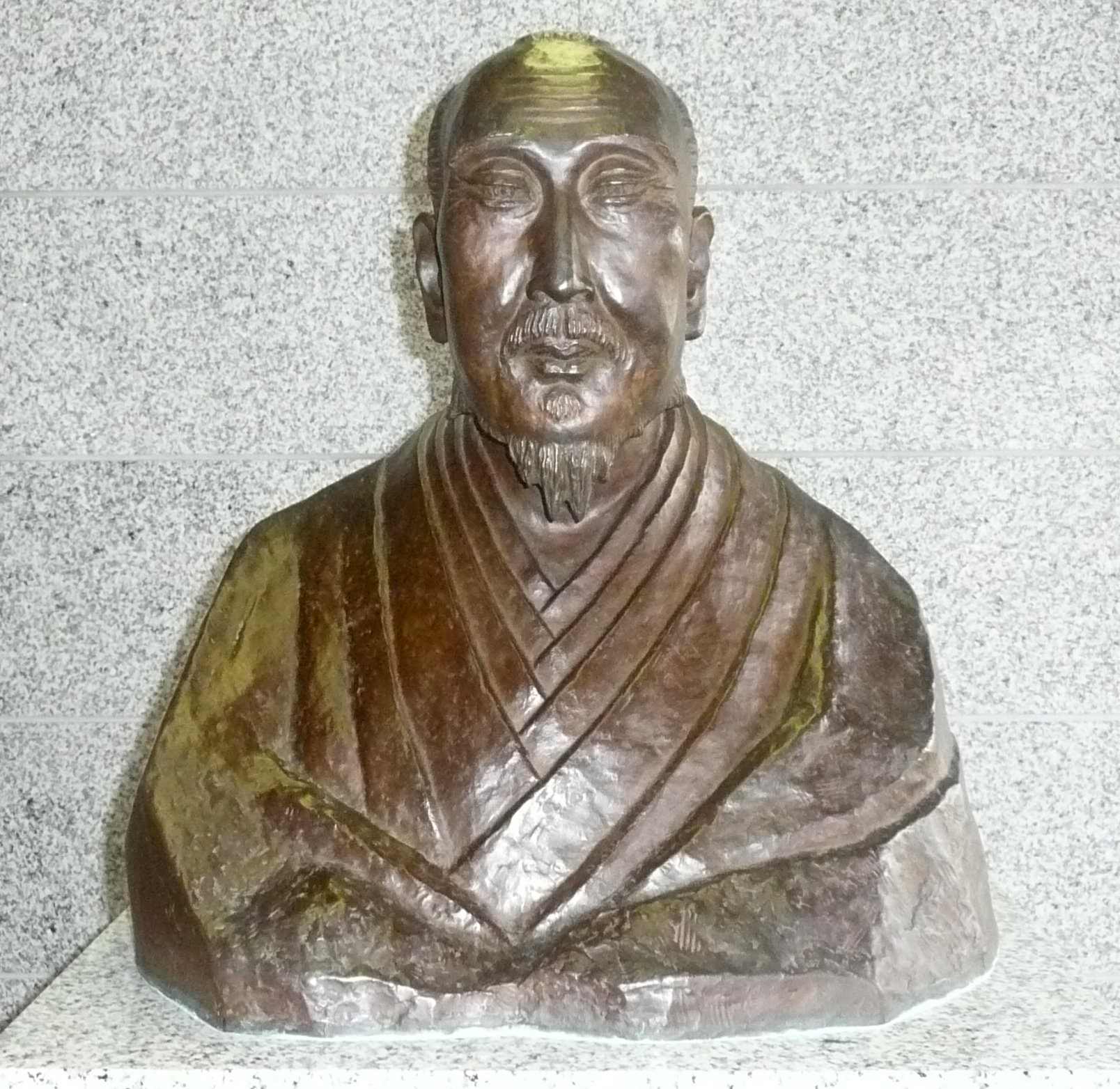
Bust of Mabuchi in Hamamatsu

Kamo no Mabuchi (賀茂 真淵; Japanese pronunciation: [ka.mo no maꜜ.bɯ.tɕi, kaꜜ.mo no | maꜜ.bɯ.tɕi], 24 April 1697 – 27 November 1769) was a kokugaku scholar, poet and philologist during mid-Edo period Japan. Along with Kada no Azumamaro, Motoori Norinaga, and Hirata Atsutane, he was regarded as one of the Four Great Men of Kokugaku, and through his research into the spirit of ancient Japan (through his studies of the Man'yōshū and other works of ancient literature) he expounded on the theory of magokoro, which he held to be fundamental to the history of Japan. Independently of and alongside his contemporary Motoori Norinaga, Mabuchi is accredited with the initial discovery of Lyman's Law, governing rendaku in the Japanese language, though which would later be named after Benjamin Smith Lyman.

== Biography ==
Mabuchi was born in 1697 in the village of Iba in Tōtōmi Province (currently part of the city of Hamamatsu, Shizuoka), as the third son of Okabe Masanobu. The Okabe were hereditary kannushi of Kamo Shrine in Kyoto, but his father was from a cadet branch of the clan and was a farmer. In 1707, he began training under Sugiura Kuniakira, a kokugaku scholar with a private academy in Hamamatsu and a disciple of Kada no Azumamaro. Mabuchi married in 1723, but his wife died the following year. At the age of 37, Mabuchi moved to Kyoto to study directly under Kada no Azumamaro. Following the master's death in 1736, Mabuchi moved to Edo in 1738 where he taught kokugaku. In 1746, he was hired by Tokugawa Munetake, the head of the Tayasu branch of the Tokugawa clan. He served in that role until 1760; four years later, in 1764, he settled in Hamachō in the Nihonbashi district of Edo, where he founded the Agatai academy and devoted his final years to writing and to teaching his disciples.

Mabuchi's works include commentaries on the Man'yōshū, norito (Shinto prayers), kagura (Shinto dances), the Tale of Genji, the meaning of poems, and other ancient works and their themes. Chief among these is the Kokuikō ("A Study of the Idea of the Nation"), which most fully expresses his reverence for the unadorned poetic style of the Man'yōshū and his advocacy of a school of thought venerating ancient Japan; his other named works include the Engi shiki noritokai (a commentary on the liturgical prayers of the Engishiki), the Goikō (a treatise on five classical subjects: literature, poetry, nativism, language, and writing), the Man'yōkai, the Kanjikō, the Nihimanabi, and the Noritokō. His disciples included Motoori Norinaga, Arakida Hisaoyu, Kato Chikage, Murata Harumi, Katori Nahiko, Hanawa Hokiichi, Uchiyama Matatsu, and Kurita Hijimaro, and also included several women.

In 1763, while Mabuchi was on his way to Ise Shrine, Motoori Norinaga sought him out and became a disciple. This single night of discussions, later known as "the night in Matsuzaka", was the only occasion on which Norinaga directly received teaching from Mabuchi, although the two men later corresponded.

Mabuchi died in 1769 in Edo, at the age of 73. His grave can be found in the Tōkai-ji cemetery in Shinagawa and was designed a National Historic Site in 1926. An explanatory marker stands at the site of Mabuchi's residence in Edo (Hisamatsu-cho, Nihonbashi, Chūō, Tokyo), and a memorial museum was built beside the house where he was born in Hamamatsu.

== See also ==
- Kokugaku
- Man'yōshū
- Shinto
- Kada no Azumamaro
- Japanese nationalism
- Keichū
- Magokoro
- Motoori Norinaga
- Ueda Akinari
