= Hirata Atsutane =

18th and 19th-century Japanese theologian

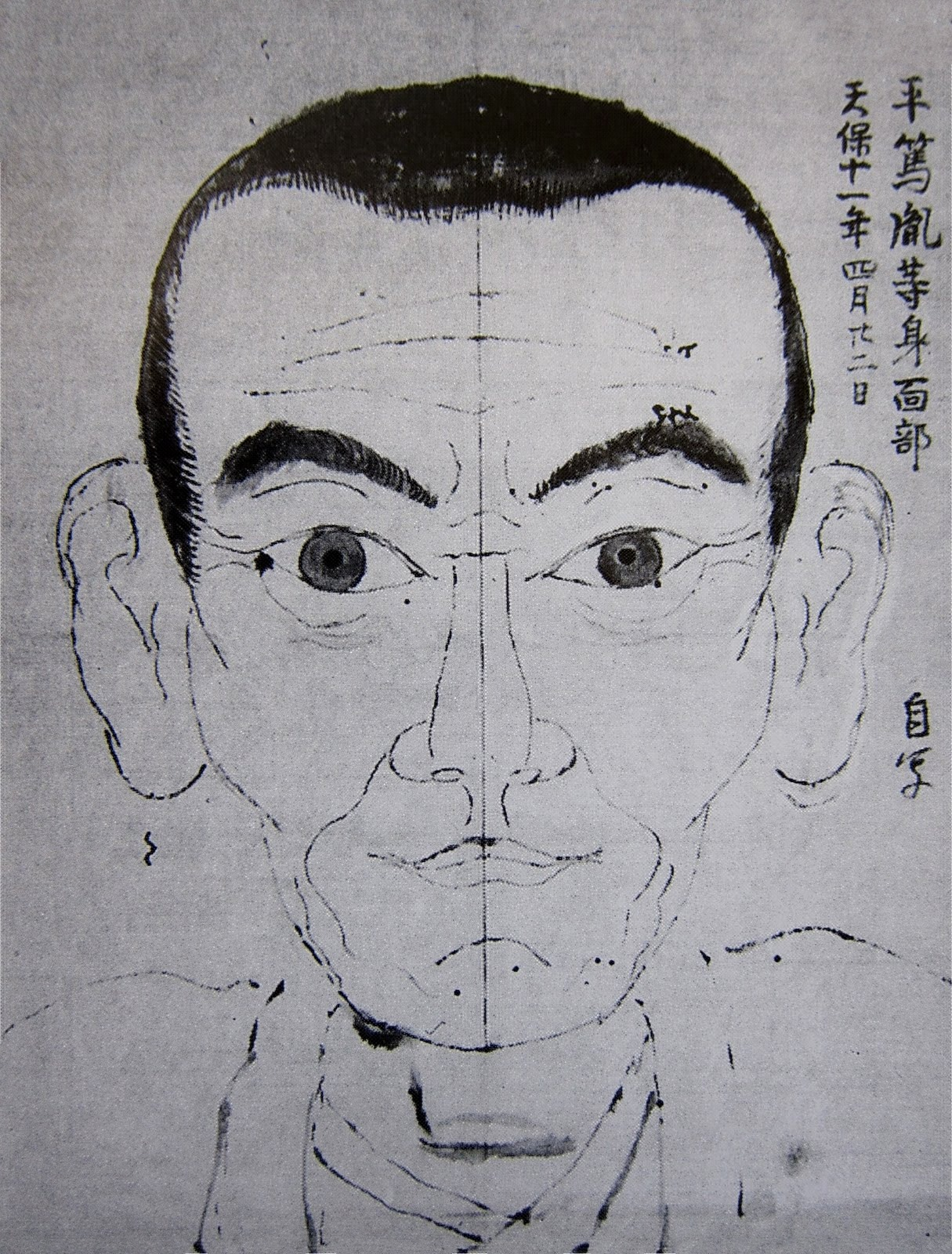
- Self-portrait by Hirata, made in 1841 at the age of 65.
- Born: Ōwada Taneyuki (大和田胤行); October 6, 1776; Kubota Domain, Dewa Province, Japan
- Died: November 2, 1843 (aged 67); Kubota Domain, Dewa Province, Japan

Hirata Atsutane (平田 篤胤; 6 October 1776 – 2 November 1843) was a Japanese scholar, conventionally ranked as one of the Four Great Men of Kokugaku (nativist) studies, and one of the most significant 19th century theologians of the Shintō religion. His literary name was Ibukinoya (気吹舎), and his primary assumed name was Daigaku (大壑, Great Abyss). He also used the names Daikaku (大角), Gentaku (玄琢), and Genzui (玄瑞). His personal name was Hanbē (半兵衛).

== Biography ==
=== Early life ===
Hirata was born as the fourth son of Ōwada Seihē Toshitane (大和田 清兵衛 祚胤), an Obangashira (low-ranking) samurai of Kubota Domain, in what is now part of the city of Akita in northern Japan. Little is known of his early childhood, but it appears he was impoverished and faced hostility from his step-mother. He left home in 1795, renouncing his ties to his family and to the Domain and traveled to Edo and worked as a laborer and as a servant, while pursuing opportunities to study rangaku, geography, and astronomy. In 1800, at the age of 25, he caught the attention of Hirata Tōbē (平田藤兵衛), a scholar and instructor in the Yamaga school of military strategy, formerly of Bitchū-Matsuyama Domain, who adopted him and from whom he received the family name of Hirata. Around this time, he met his future wife, the daughter of Ishibashi Tsunefusa (石橋常房), a hatamoto of Numazu Domain, whom he married the following year. Evidently the two became romantically involved while Hirata was working as a menial servant in the Ishibashi household. Taking his family name, she was known as Hirata Orise (平田織瀬). Orise died in 1812.

Hirata claimed to be a descendant of Taira no Masakado.

=== Development of Kokugaku studies ===
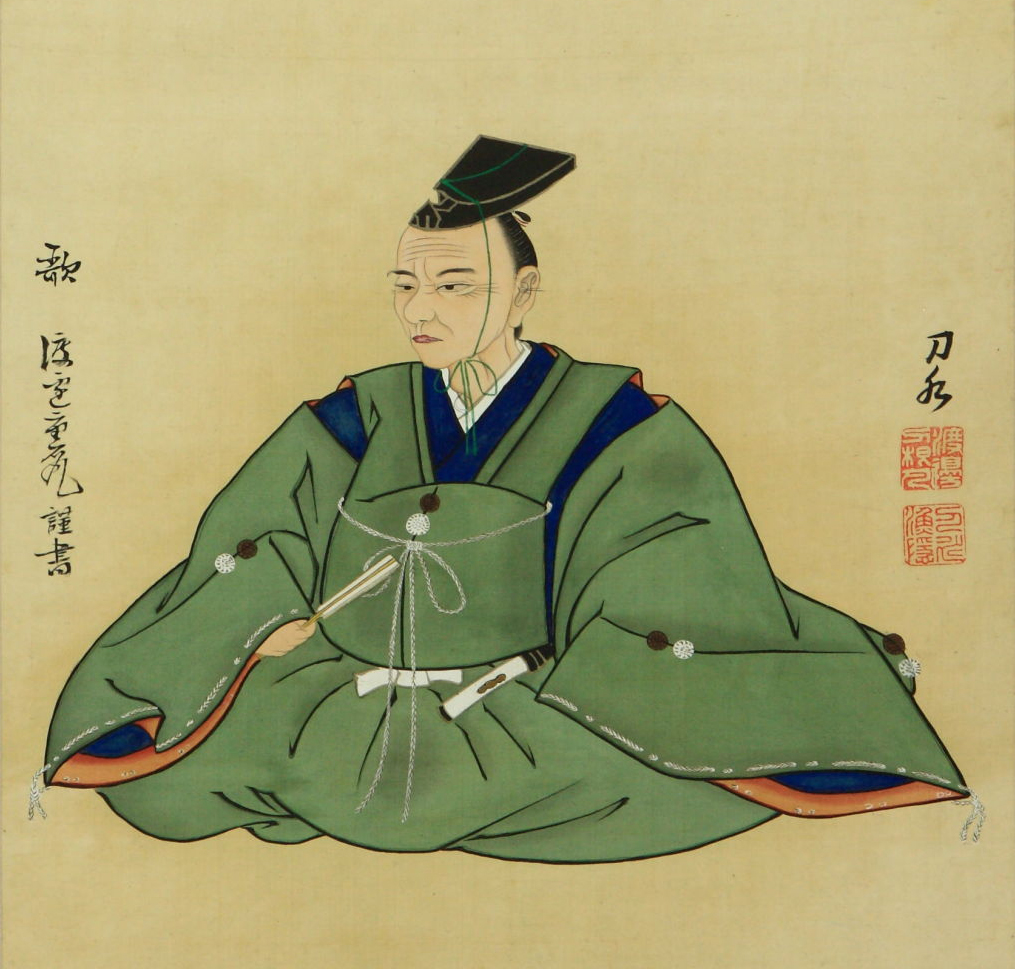
Portrait of Atsutane Hirata, from an 18th century hanging scroll by an unknown author

While in Edo, Hirata was a student of the Neo-Confucianism of Yamazaki Ansai (1619–1682); however, his interests were very broad. Concerned by Russian raids and incursions into north Ezo (today's Sakhalin and the Kuril Islands), he studied modern Dutch medicine under the surgeon Yoshida Chōshuku. His studies under Yoshida included at least one human dissection. He later turned towards Daoism as found in the works of the Chinese philosopher Zhuangzi. He learned about the works of Motoori Norinaga, the founder of the kokugaku movement, in 1803, two years after Motoori's death. Hirata claimed later to have received the mantle of kokugaku teacher in a dream directly from Motoori Norinaga, but the story is apocryphal. Originally, he published under the name of Masuganoya (真菅乃屋), meaning "house of sedge", but during a tour of rural shrines in 1816 he acquired an ancient stone vessel flute which he cherished dearly and changed his publishing name to Ibukinoya, or "house of breath". He became a student of Motoori Haruniwa, and read voraciously the ancient and Chinese classics, foreign works by Nicolaus Copernicus and Isaac Newton and treatises on Buddhism and Shinto. He was also a prolific writer. Representative works in the study of ancient Japanese traditions include Tama no mihashira, Koshi seibun, Kodō taii and Zoku shintō taii, and the commentaries Koshichō and Koshiden. He is also noted for his studies of ancient Indian and Chinese tradition (Indo zōshi and Morokoshi taikoden), and texts dealing with the spirit world, including Senkyō ibun and Katsugorō saisei kibun. His early work Honkyō gaihen indicates an acquaintance with Christian literature that had been authored by Jesuits in China.

Though he is traditionally ranked fourth in the lineage of kokugaku scholars, Hirata actually represents a break with the purely scholarly urban culture characteristic of the revival of classical nativist learning, and represents a trend toward a populist message. Hirata laid particular emphasis on reaching the average man, and adapted his own style to them by employing at times the vernacular idiom. Hirata frequently expressed hostility to the Confucian and Buddhist scholars of the day, advocating instead a revival of the “ancient ways” in which the emperor was to be revered. Hirata's first published work, Kamōsho (1803) was a scathing attack on the works of Confucian philosopher Dazai Shundai (1680–1747) on Buddhism, and resulted in an invitation to teach from the Yoshida family, the hereditary clan leading Yoshida Shinto.

The contents of his 1841 treatise Tenchō mukyūreki, in which he suggested that loyalty to the Emperor ought to take precedence over loyalty to one's lord (i.e. the shogun), angered the ruling Tokugawa government, and he was sentenced to house arrest in Akita until his death in 1843.

== Influence ==
Hirata's activities eventually attracted over 500 pupils, including Okuni Takamasa and Suzuki Shigetane. His nationalist writings had considerable impact on the samurai who supported the Sonnō jōi movement and who fought in the Boshin War to overthrow the Tokugawa Shogunate during the Meiji Restoration.

Hirata's influence on kokugaku has recently been thought to be overestimated. While he is called one of the "four great men of kokugaku", this is a phrase he invented himself. His work more often influenced religious groups than the government in the Empire of Japan.

Among Hirata's more enduring contributions to Japanese thought was to remind all Japanese that they were descended from the kami, not only the Imperial family and certain aristocratic families. As he put it, "this, our glorious land, is the land in which the kami have their origin, and we are one and all descendants of the kami. For this reason, if we go back from the parents who gave us life and being, beyond the grandparents and great-grandparents, and consider the ancestors of ancient times, then the original ancestors of those must necessarily have been the kami."

A poem by Atsutane, collected by Tsunoda Tadayuki in Ibukinoya kashū (氣吹廼舎歌集), was included in the 1942 Aikoku Hyakunin Isshu.

Spread the righteous path across the countless countries of the endless blue sea
青海原潮の八百重の八十国につぎてひろめよこの正道を

== Hirata Atsutane's grave ==
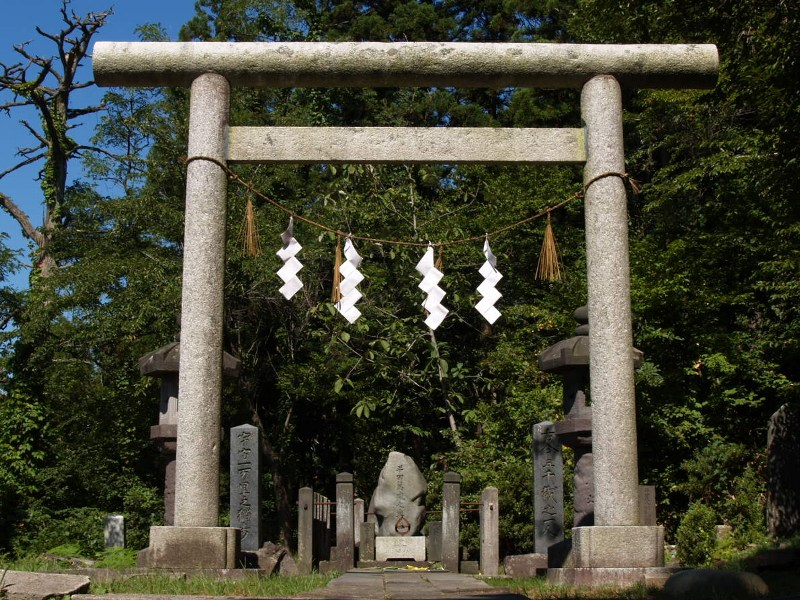
Hirata Atsutane's grave

Hirata died at his home in Nakakame-cho, Akita in 1843, and as per the provisions of his will, was buried on a hillside in the city (39°43′43″N 140°08′14″E). The tombstone is a natural stone simply inscribed with his name, surrounded by a stone fence and a stone torii gate are placed at the entrance. The tomb was designated a National Historic Site of Japan in 1934.

== Views on the afterlife ==
Hirata departed from the eschatology of his predecessor Motoori Norinaga, who held that all human souls, regardless of merit, descended after death to the polluted realm of Yomi. Hirata instead argued that the dead pass into kakuriyo (幽冥), a hidden realm that coexists with and overlaps the world of the living rather than being separated from it, where they are judged by the kami Ōkuninushi according to their conduct in life. He set out this argument in his 1813 treatise Tama no mihashira (The True Pillar of the Spirit), written to clarify the postmortem destination of the spirit and to reinforce the concept of the Japanese spirit (yamatogokoro); the work drew heavily on Hattori Nakatsune's Sandaikō, using ten diagrams and accompanying notes to detail the formation of heaven, earth, and Yomi.

== Selected works ==
- Chishima no shiranami (千島の白波, White Waves of Chishima)
- Honkyō gaihen (本教外篇, Outer Chapters of Our Doctrine)
- Kodō taii (古道大意, General Introduction to the Path of Antiquity)
- Tama no mihashira (霊能真柱, True Pillar of the Spirit)
- Tamadasuki (玉襷, The Precious Tasuki)
- Zoku shintō taii (俗神道大意, General Introduction to Folk Shintō)
- Koshichō (古史徴, Index to Ancient History)
- Koshiden (古史伝, Commentary on Ancient History)
- Shizu no iwaya (志都能石屋, The Quiet Cave)
- Shutsujō shōgo (出定笑語, Laughing Discourse upon Emerging from Meditation)
- Indo zōshi (印度蔵志, Collection of Truth About India)
- Morokoshi taikoden (唐土太古傳, Transmission of Ancient Chinese History)
- Senkyō ibun (仙境異聞, Strange Tales from the Land of the Immortals)
- Katsugorō saisei kibun (勝五郎再生記聞, Account of Katsugorō's Rebirth)
- Reihō gogaku shinkeizu (霊宝五嶽真形図, Accurate Diagram of the Five Peaks)
- Saiseki gairon (西籍慨論, Reprobation of Western Scholarship)
- Tenchūki (天柱記, Record of the Pillar of Heaven)
- Kamōsho (呵妄書, Rebuke of Insolent Writings)
- Kokon yōmikō (古今妖魅考, Investigation of Paranormal Phenomena of the Past and Present)
- Tenchō mukyūreki (天朝無窮暦, Calendar of the Immortal Imperial Court)
- A commentary on the Inō mononokeroku (稲生物怪録, Account of the Haunting of Inō) of 1749.

== Notes ==
1.The name was inspired by a passage from the Zhuangzi. Although the term is today generally translated as "ocean", its use in classical Chinese literature with which Hirata had intimate familiarity included a more general meaning of vast profundity and was used metaphorically with regard to qi and its source. "Zhun Mang (諄芒), on his way to the ocean, met with Yuan Feng on the shore of the eastern sea, and was asked by him where he was going. 'I am going,' he replied, 'to the ocean;' and the other again asked, 'What for?' Zhun Mang said, 'Such is the nature of the ocean (大壑, dàhè) that the waters which flow into it can never fill it, nor those which flow from it exhaust it. I will enjoy myself, rambling by it.'"
2.A treatise on national defense advocating a military buildup on Sakhalin and throughout the Kuriles to counter Russian expansion into Northeast Asia.
3.This text's name is a pun on the strongly anti-Shinto Tominaga Nakamoto's 1745 Shutsujō gogo, or "Discourse upon Emerging from Meditation".

== See also ==
- Hayashi Ōen
- Sugiyama Sōjō
- Hirata Kanetane (1799-1880)
- Hirata Nobutane (1828-1872)
- Hirata Moritane (1863-1945)
- Hirata Munetane (????-1973)
