= Mono no aware =

Japanese idiom

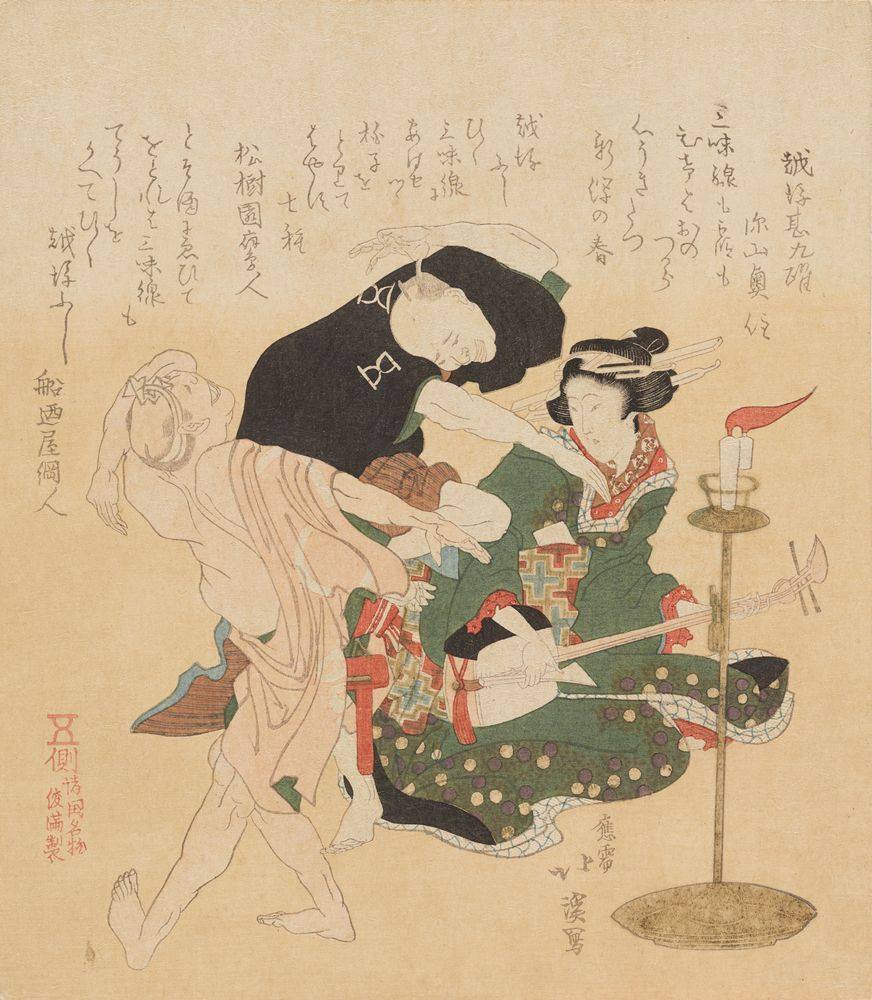
Japanese woodblock print showcasing transience, precarious beauty, and the passage of time, thus "mirroring" mono no aware

Mono no aware (物の哀れ), (Note: Historical kana orthography: もののあはれ, modern kana: もののあわれ. The old kana form remains preferred in modern usage.) lit. 'the pathos of things', also translated as 'an empathy toward things', or 'a sensitivity to ephemera', is a Japanese idiom for the aesthetic appreciation of impermanence (無常, mujō), or transience of things, and both a transient gentle sadness (or wistfulness) at their passing as well as a longer, deeper gentle sadness about this state being the reality of life.

== Origins and analysis ==
The idiom mono no aware comes from Heian period literature, but was picked up and used by 18th century Edo period Japanese cultural scholar Motoori Norinaga in his literary criticism of The Tale of Genji, and later to other germinal Japanese works including the Man'yōshū. It became central to his philosophy of literature; he saw it as the main theme of The Tale of Genji. His articulation was the result of well-established poetic readings of The Tale of Genji and the concept became central to his own; Genji was "instrumental" in the term's establishment. According to Norinaga, to "know" mono no aware is to have a shrewd understanding and consideration of reality and the assortment of occurrences present; to be affected by and appreciate the beauty of cherry blossoms was an example of this knowledge provided by Norinaga.

Japanese cultural scholar Kazumitsu Kato wrote that understanding mono no aware in the Heian period was "almost a necessity for a learned man in aristocratic society", a time when it was a prominent concept. Donald Richie wrote that the term has "a near-Buddhistic insistence upon recognition of the eternal flux of life upon this earth. This is the authentic Japanese attitude toward death and disaster". Various other scholars have discussed the term.

== Etymology ==
The phrase is derived from the Japanese word mono (物), which means 'thing', the particle no, which means 'of', and the word aware (哀れ), which was a Heian period expression of measured surprise (similar to 'ah' or 'oh'), translating roughly as 'pathos', 'poignancy', 'deep feeling', 'sensitivity', or 'awareness'. Mono no aware has seen multiple translations, such as 'pathos of things' and 'sensitivity of things'; the Latin phrase lacrimae rerum has also been invoked. Due to the Buddhist influence in Japan, the expression has also seen connection to anicca, which is one of the three marks of existence in buddhism, representing impermanence.

Awareness of the transience of all things heightens appreciation of their beauty, and evokes a gentle sadness at their passing. Norinaga saw the state of being aware as the fundamental condition of the concept.

The term has seen gradual change in its meaning, although "from the beginning it represented a feeling of a special kind: 'not a powerful surge of passion, but an emotion containing a balance...'".

== In contemporary culture ==
Mono no aware is "one of the most well-known concepts in traditional literary criticism in Japan". Yasunari Kawabata was a considerable modern proponent of mono no aware. Norinaga asserted that the feeling of mono no aware may be so profound that allusions to senses, highlighting "the sound of wind or crickets, [...] the colour of flowers or snow", would be the only apt expression.

Notable manga artists who use mono no aware-style storytelling include Hitoshi Ashinano, Kozue Amano, and Kaoru Mori. In anime, both Only Yesterday by Isao Takahata and Mai Mai Miracle by Sunao Katabuchi emphasize the passing of time in gentle notes and by presenting the main plot against a parallel one from the past.

By the 1970s, mono no aware had been adopted in Japanese and English film criticism with noted attention towards the Japanese director Yasujirō Ozu. Ozu was well known for creating a sense of mono no aware, frequently climaxing with a character very understatedly saying "Ii tenki desu ne?" (いい天気ですね, 'Fine weather, isn't it?'), after a familial and societal paradigm shift, such as a daughter being married off, against the backdrop of a swiftly changing Japan. Ozu has often expressed feelings by showing the faces of objects rather than the face of an actor. Some examples include two fathers contemplating the rocks in a "dry landscape" garden, and a mirror reflecting the absence of the daughter who has just left home after getting married.

Science fiction author Ken Liu's short story Mono no Aware won the 2013 Hugo Award for Best Short Story. Inspired by works like the science fiction manga Yokohama Kaidashi Kikou, Liu sought to evoke an "aesthetic primarily oriented towards creating in the reader an empathy towards the inevitable passing of all things", and to acknowledge "the importance of memory and continuity with the past".

Akira Kurosawa's I Live in Fear and Shohei Imamura's Black Rain have both been associated with the term.

In Mike Carey's Rampart Trilogy, "Monono Aware" is the pseudonym of a Japanese pop star whose personality and memories are licensed as content for the Sony DreamSleeve, an AI-enhanced music player released before the fall of human civilization.

== See also ==
- Melancholia
- Vanitas
- This too shall pass, a Middle-Eastern adage regarding ephemerality

Related terms with no direct translation in English:

- Han
- Lacrimae rerum
- Ubi sunt
- Mottainai
- Wabi-sabi
- Weltschmerz
- Sehnsucht
- Saudade
