= Motoori Norinaga =

Japanese scholar and philosopher (1730–1801)

- 本居 宣長
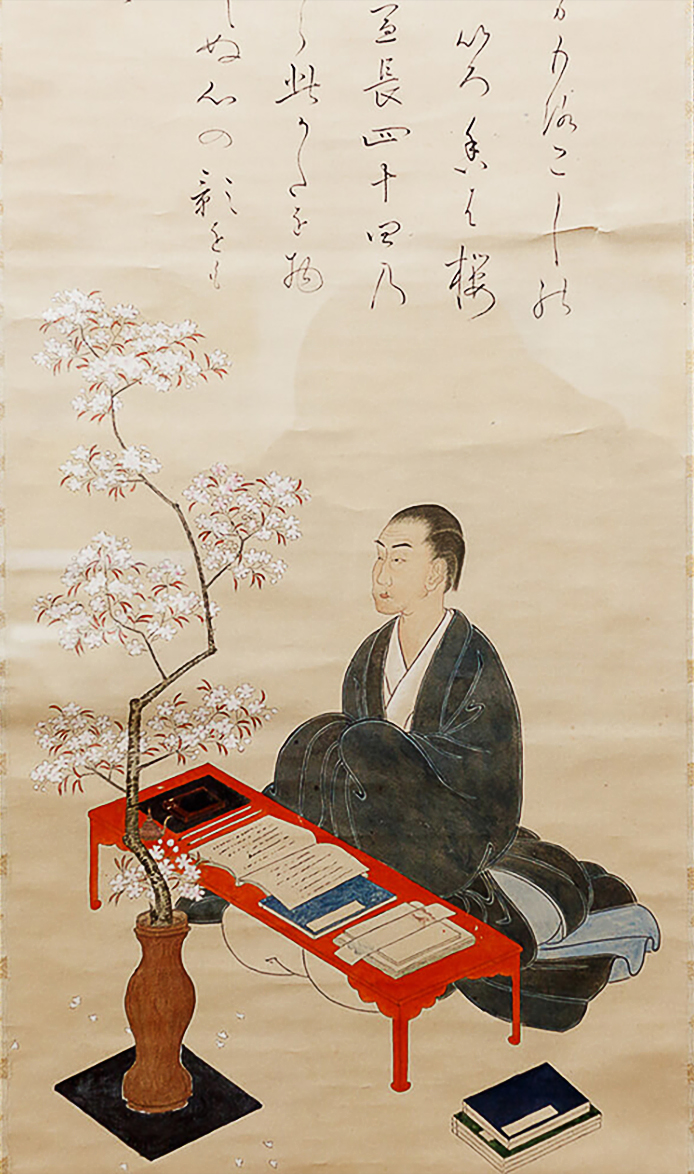
- Self-portrait by Motoori
- Born: 21 June 1730
- Died: November 5, 1801 (aged 71); Matsusaka, Mie Prefecture

Philosophical work
- Era: Edo period
- Region: Eastern philosophy: Japanese philosophy
- Main interests: Japanese literature, grammar
- Notable works: Kojiki-den
- Notable ideas: Lyman's Law

Motoori Norinaga (Note: Japanese pronunciation: [mo.toꜜ.o.ɾʲi | no.ɾʲiꜜ.na.ɡa, mo.to.o.ɾʲi no.ɾʲiꜜ.na.ɡa, mo.toꜜ.o.ɾʲi (|) no.ɾʲi.na.ɡa, -na.ŋa]) (本居 宣長; 21 June 1730 – 5 November 1801) was a Japanese scholar of Kokugaku active during the Edo period. He is conventionally ranked as one of the Four Great Men of Kokugaku (nativist) studies.

== Life ==
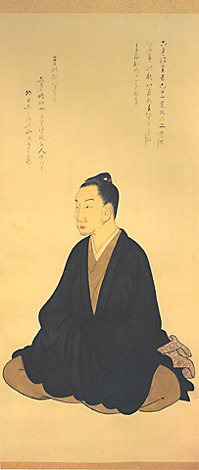
Motoori Norinaga (1790)

Norinaga was born in what is now Matsusaka in Ise Province (now part of Mie Prefecture). His ancestors were vassals of the Kitabatake clan in Ise Province for many generations. However, in the early Edo period they abandoned their samurai status, changing their surname to Ozu, and relocated to Matsusaka, where they became cotton wholesalers. The family initially prospered and had a store in Edo as well. (The film director Yasujirō Ozu was a descendant of the same line). After his elder brother's death, Norinaga succeeded to the Ozu line. At one stage he was adopted out to a paper-making family but the bookish boy was not suited to business.

It was at his mother's suggestion that, at the age of 22, Norinaga went to Kyoto to study medicine. In Kyoto, he also studied Chinese and Japanese philology under the neo-Confucianist Hori Keizan. It was at this time that Norinaga became interested in the Japanese classics and decided to enter the field of kokugaku under the influence of Ogyū Sorai and Keichū. (With changes in the language, the ancient classics were already poorly understood by Japanese in the Edo period and texts needed philological analysis in order to be properly understood.) Life in Kyoto also instilled in the young Norinaga a love of traditional Japanese court culture.

Returning to Matsusaka, Norinaga opened a medical practice for infants while devoting his spare time to lectures on The Tale of Genji and studies of the Nihon Shoki (Chronicles of Japan). At the age of 27, he bought several books by Kamo no Mabuchi and embarked on his Kokugaku researches. As a doctor, he reassumed his ancestral samurai surname of Motoori.

In 1763, Norinaga met Mabuchi in person when the latter visited Matsusaka, a meeting that has come down in history as 'the night in Matsusaka'. Norinaga took the occasion to ask Mabuchi to supervise his annotations of the Kojiki ("Records of Ancient Matters"). Mabuchi suggested that Norinaga should first tackle the annotations to the Man'yōshū in order to accustom himself to the ancient kana usage known as the man'yōgana. This was the only meeting between the two men, but they continued to correspond and, with Mabuchi's encouragement, Norinaga later went on to full-fledged research into the Kojiki.

Norinaga's disciples included Ishizuka Tatsumaro, Nagase Masaki, Natsume Mikamaro, Takahashi Mikiakira and Motoori Haruniwa (Norinaga's son).

Although overshadowed by his activities as a kokugaku scholar, Norinaga spent 40 years as a practicing doctor in Matsusaka and was seeing patients until ten days before his death in 1801.

== Works ==
Norinaga's most important works include the Kojiki-den (Commentaries on the Kojiki), made over a period of around 35 years, and his annotations on the Tale of Genji. The commentary's publication was underwritten chiefly by his disciple Yokoi Chiaki, a retainer of the Owari domain and committed kokugaku adherent, while the text for the woodblocks was transcribed by Norinaga's son Motoori Haruniwa and the printing itself carried out by his disciple Uematsu Arinobu. Norinaga circulated each stage of the manuscript among his most trusted disciples and colleagues as it was completed, but at his death only the first seventeen of what would eventually be forty-eight fascicles had been published; his disciples continued the task, completing the entire commentary twenty-one years after his death. Using the methods of kokugaku and kaozheng, Norinaga claimed that the Kojiki was the oldest surviving Japanese text. He used the supposed antiquity of the Kojiki to develop an idea of indigenous Japanese religion and laws which were later used in the development of an idea of State Shinto.

Norinaga took the view that the heritage of ancient Japan was one of natural spontaneity in feelings and spirit, and that imported Confucianism ran counter to such natural feelings. In his 1763 work Personal Views on Poetry (Isonokami Sasamegoto, 石上私淑言) Norinaga argued that Waka poetry, with its focus on these natural feelings cultivated a true and simple nature in the Japanese 'heart' - which he contrasted with the "artificially clever hearts" of Chinese poets. He criticized Ogyū Sorai for his over-valuing of Chinese civilization and thought, although it has been pointed out that his philological methodology was heavily influenced by Sorai's. His ideas were influenced by the Chinese intellectual Wang Yangming, who had argued for innate knowing, that mankind had a naturally intuitive (as opposed to rational) ability to distinguish good and evil. [citation needed] Central to Norinaga's method was his critique of karagokoro (漢意, lit. "Chinese mind"), the foreign-influenced habits of thought he believed had distorted later interpretations of the Japanese classics. He argued that only a reader who set aside karagokoro and approached texts such as the Kojiki with an unclouded heart could recover their original, unmediated meaning.

敷島の大和心を人問はば，朝日に匂ふ山桜花。
If one should ask you concerning the spirit of a true Japanese, point to the wild cherry blossom shining in the morning sun.

— Motoori Norinaga, "Shikishima no Uta" (敷島の歌).

mono no aware (concept related to magokoro which Kamo no Mabuchi also spoke about), a particular Japanese sensibility of "sorrow at evanescence" that Norinaga claimed forms the essence of Japanese literature. Each man, according to Motoori, has at his birth a "true heart" a "magokoro" (the term magokokoro is itself almost an onomatopoeia since kokoro (the heart) expresses these "beats of the heart") whose ancient Japanese literature is the most faithful expression.

In undertaking his textual analysis of ancient Japanese, Norinaga also made vital contributions to establishing a native Japanese grammatical tradition, in particular the analysis of clitics, particles and auxiliary verbs. As part of this research, Norinaga would initially discover Lyman's Law of rendaku, preceding the naming of which in honor of its later proponent, Benjamin Smith Lyman, by some 100 years.

== Timeline ==
- 1730 - Born as second son
- Education:
  - At the age of seven could already read and write
  - 11 years old reciting Noh theatre pieces and Confucian classics
  - 13y. visiting the shrine of Yoshino
  - 16y. archery
  - 18y. Japanese tea ceremony
  - 19y. advanced Confucian training
- 1748 - Norinaga is adopted by the Imaida family, reversed after only 2 years.
- 1751 - His stepbrother dies.
- 1752 - Goes to Kyoto to study medical science
- 1752–57 - Some scholars note his productivity. Motoori produces 2000 Waka and 40 books and copies 15 others.
- 1757 - Reads Kamo no Mabuchi's first book, Kanji kō. Lacking money he returns to his hometown to open a medical practice.
- 1760 - Enters arranged marriage with Murata Mika; divorced after 3 months.
- 1762 - Marries Kusubuka Tami and one year later their son Haruniwa is born.
- 1763 - Meets Kamo no Mabuchi who tells him to read the Nihonshoki and the Man'yōshū
- 1764–71 - Studies the Kojiki, and begins to spread his teachings.
- 1799 - Motoori Ōhira became his adopted son.
- 1801 - Dies.

== Motoori Norinaga Former Residence ==
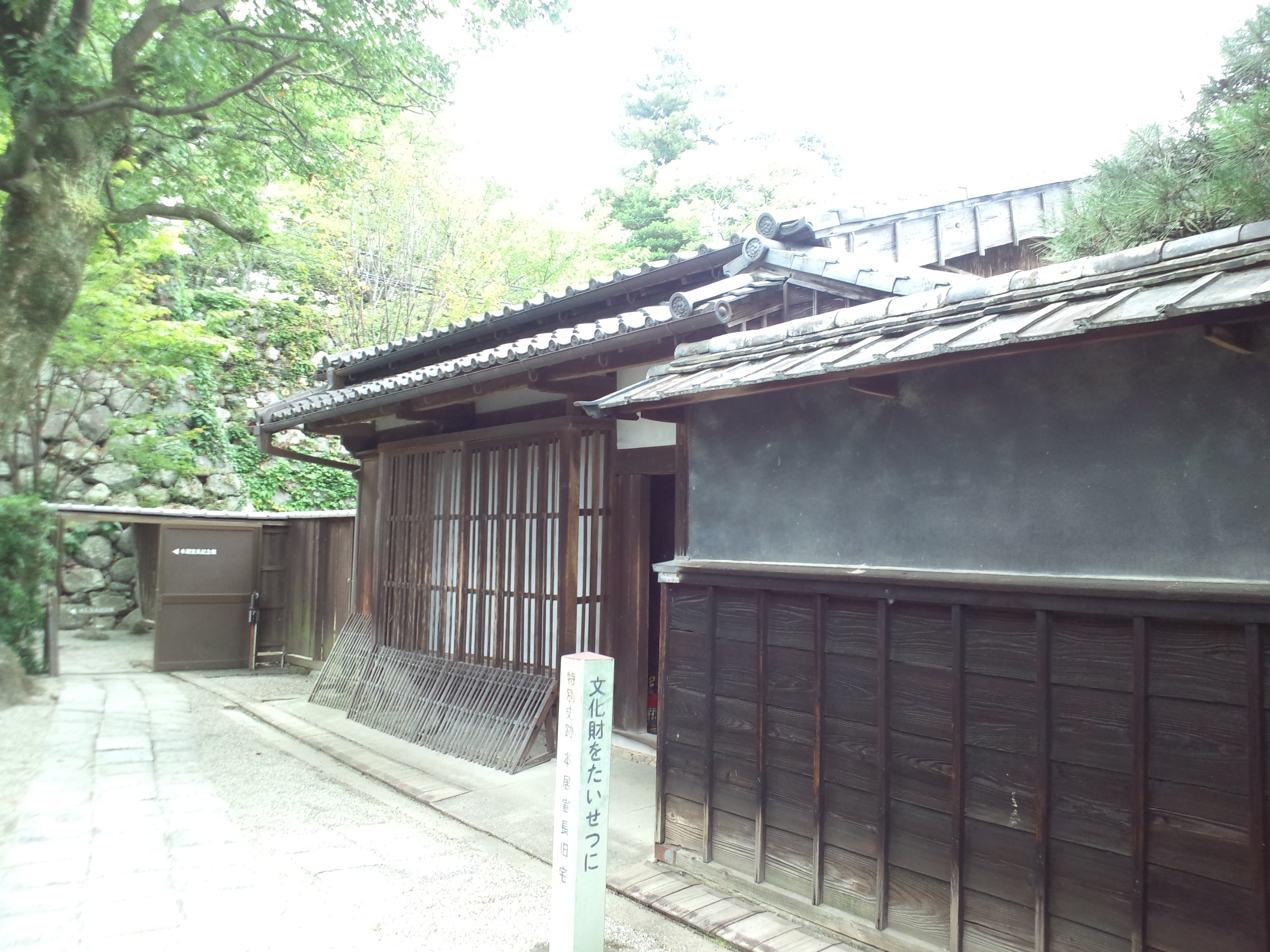
Motoori Norinaga's home, preserved as a museum

The former residence of Motoori Norinaga Motoori Norinaga kyu-taku (本居宣長旧宅) was constructed in 1691 as a retirement retreat by his grandfather, Ozu Sanshiemon Sadaharu. Originally located in the Uomachi neighborhood of Matsusaka, it was relocated to its present site within the grounds of Matsusaka Castle in 1909. Motoori Norinaga lived there from age 12 to his death at age 71.

When Norinaga was 11 years old, his father, Ozu Sadatoshi Sanshiemon, died. His brother-in-law, Ozu Sogoro Sadaharu, took over the business, but the Ozu family's luck gradually began to decline. The following year, Norinaga was forced to move to the retreat built by his grandfather, together with his mother, one of his younger brothers and two younger sisters. Norinaga then lived in this house until his death at the age of 72, except for seven years when he studied medicine in Kyoto when he was young.

After the death of his brother-in-law, Norinaga succeeded the Ozu family, but stopped doing business. He worked as a town doctor using this house as a clinic, while he worked on the study of Japanese classical literature, and wrote the "Kojikiden," and other works. When Norinaga was 53 years old, he remodeled the storeroom on the second floor to create a new study. He hung a bell (suzu) on a pillar between the floors of his study and named this study "Suzunoya". His descendants continued to live in this house until the Meiji period; however, as the new Meiji government gave increasing prominence to his works as the basis of State Shinto and kokugaku studies, a movement arose to preserve the structure. In 1909, it was relocated to the grounds of Matsusaka Castle and effort has been made to preserve the interior as closely as possible to the time when it was used by Norinaga. In 1953, the structure and the site of Uomachi before the relocation were designated as a Special National Monument.

Portions of the building are open to the public as part of the Motoori Norinaga Commemorative Museum (本居宣長記念館, Motoori Norinaga kinenkan). Motoori's writing studio on the second floor contains some examples of original manuscripts. The museum houses many artifacts that are protected as Important Cultural Properties of Japan, of which only a small portion is on display at any time.

== Grave of Motoori Norinaga (Mount Yamamuro) ==
After Motoori died, he was buried on the summit of Mount Yamamuro behind the temple of Myōraku-ji in Matsusaka. The grave was situated to overlook the town on Matsusaka, and the hills of Mikawa and Mount Fuji in the distance across Ise Bay and is inscribed with a poem from the Man'yōshū. The site was designated per detailed instructions left in his will, and Motoori had visited the site before his death to plant flowering mountain sakura trees and to design the layout of his tomb; however, the scenery around it has been drastically altered since that time with the construction of the Yamamuroyama Jinja Shinto shrine in 1875. Beside his tomb is a memorial cenotaph to his masters, Hirata Atsutane and Uematsu Arinobu. The tomb and its surroundings were designated a National Historic Site in 1936. The current grave was extensively renovated in 1999.

Motoori Norinaga has a second tomb at the Motoori clan cemetery in the temple of Jukyō-ji in downtown Matsusaka. This tomb, along with that of his son Motoori Harunaga, was collectively designated a separate National Historic Site in 1936.

== See also ==
- Kamo no Mabuchi
- Kokugaku
- Japanese poetry
- Japanese nationalism
- Hagiwara Hiromichi
- List of Historic Sites of Japan (Mie)
- Magokoro
- Mono no aware
- Motoori Ōhira
- Motoori Haruniwa
