= Kokugaku =

Japanese Edo period academic movement

Kokugaku (国学; Japanese pronunciation: [ko.kɯ.ɡa.kɯ, -ŋa.kɯ], lit. 'national study') was an antiquarian academic movement and school of Japanese philology and philosophy originating during the Edo period. Kokugaku scholars worked to refocus Japanese scholarship away from the then-dominant study of Chinese, Confucian, and Buddhist texts in favor of research into the early Japanese classics.

== History ==
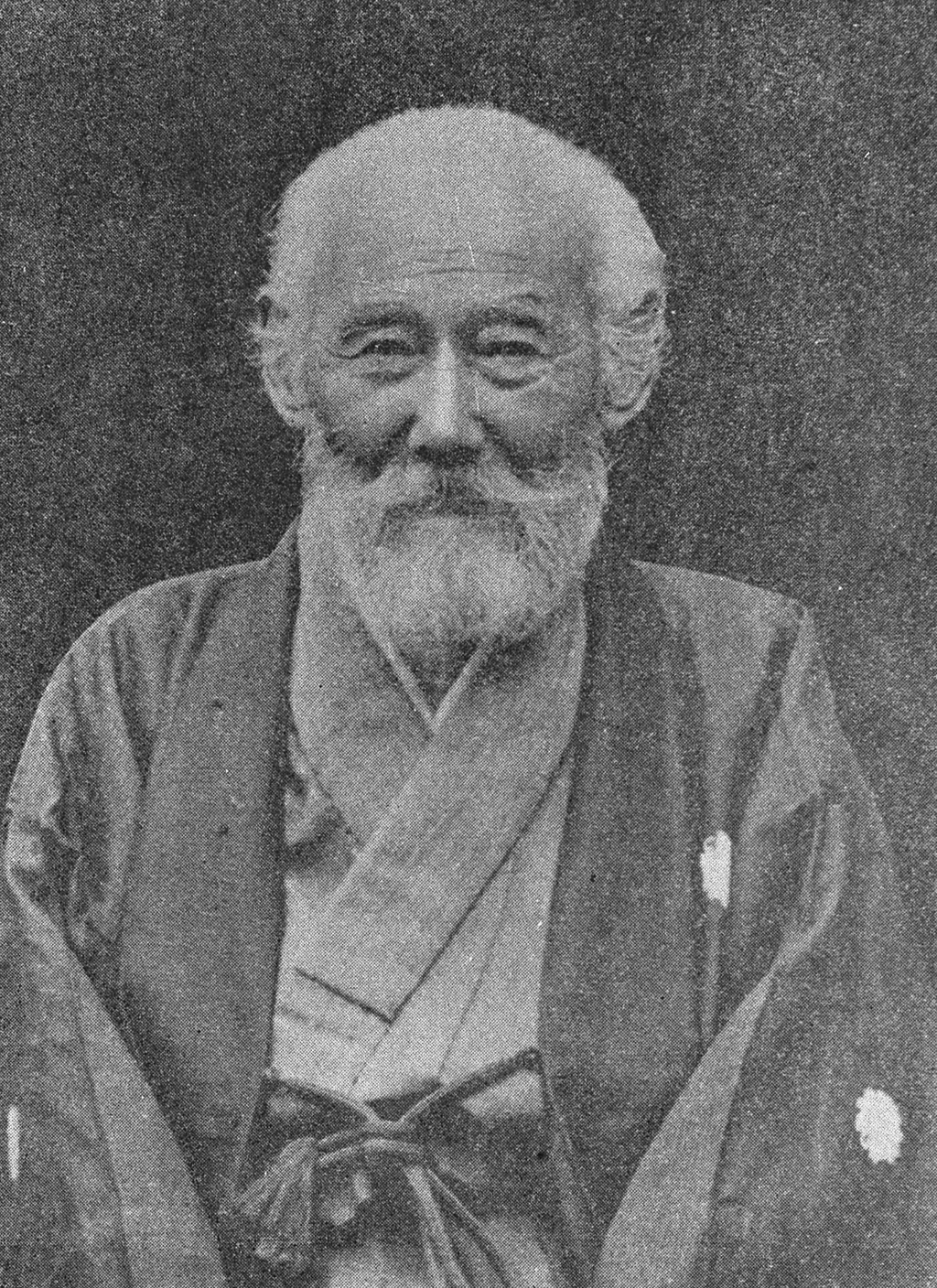
Tanimori Yoshiomi (1818–1911), a kokugaku scholar.

What later became known as the kokugaku tradition began in the 17th and 18th centuries as kogaku ("ancient studies"), wagaku ("Japanese studies") or inishie manabi ("antiquity studies"), a term favored by Motoori Norinaga and his school. Drawing heavily from Shinto and Japan's ancient literature, the school looked back to a golden age of culture and society. They drew upon ancient Japanese poetry, predating the rise of medieval Japan's feudal orders in the mid-twelfth century, and other cultural achievements to show the emotion of Japan. One famous emotion appealed to by the kokugakusha is 'mono no aware'.

Kada no Azumamaro (1669–1736), a Shinto priest at Fushimi Inari Shrine, is traditionally credited as the movement's founder, a status the scholar Ōkuni Takamasa later formalized by naming him first among the "four great men of kokugaku" (kokugaku yondaijin), alongside Kamo no Mabuchi, Motoori Norinaga, and Hirata Atsutane. This attribution rests chiefly on the Sō gakkō kei, a petition calling for the Tokugawa shogunate to establish a school of national studies; the document only came to light in 1798, some sixty years after Azumamaro's death, and its authorship remains disputed: some scholars attribute it instead to his student Yamana Reien, and suggest its original aim may have been wagaku (the study of purely Japanese subjects) rather than kokugaku in its later, more ideologically charged sense.

The word kokugaku, coined to distinguish this school from kangaku ("Chinese studies"), was popularized by Hirata Atsutane in the 19th century. It has been translated as 'Native Studies' and represented a response to Sinocentric Neo-Confucian theories. Kokugaku scholars criticized the repressive moralizing of Confucian thinkers, and tried to re-establish Japanese culture before the influx of foreign modes of thought and behaviour.

Eventually, the thinking of kokugaku scholars influenced the sonnō jōi philosophy and movement. It was this philosophy, amongst other things, that led to the eventual collapse of the Tokugawa shogunate in 1868 and the subsequent Meiji Restoration.

== Tenets ==
The kokugaku school held that the Japanese national character was naturally pure, and would reveal its inherent splendor once the foreign (Chinese) influences were removed. The "Chinese heart" was considered different from the "true heart" or "Japanese Heart". This true Japanese spirit needed to be revealed by removing a thousand years of Chinese learning. It thus took an interest in philologically identifying the ancient, indigenous meanings of ancient Japanese texts; in turn, these ideas were synthesized with early Shinto and astronomy.

== Influence ==
The term kokugaku was used liberally by early modern Japanese to refer to the "national learning" of each of the world's nations. This usage was adopted into Chinese, where it is still in use today (Chinese: 國學/国学, romanized: guóxué). The Chinese also adopted the kokugaku term "national essence" (Japanese: 国粹, romanized: kokusui, Chinese: 國粹/国粹, romanized: guócuì).

According to scholar of religion Jason Ānanda Josephson, kokugaku played a role in the consolidation of State Shinto in the Meiji era. It promoted a unified, scientifically grounded and politically powerful vision of Shinto against Buddhism, Christianity, and Japanese folk religions, many of which were named "superstitions."

== Notable kokugaku scholars ==
- Shimogawa Keichū
- Hanawa Hokiichi
- Hagiwara Hiromichi
- Todoroki Buhee
- Hirata Atsutane
- Hayashi Ōen
- Kada no Azumamaro
- Kamo no Mabuchi
- Katori Nahiko
- Motoori Norinaga
- Motoori Ōhira
- Motoori Haruniwa
- Tanaka Ōhide
- Matsuo Taseko
- Shimazaki Masaki
- Tsunoda Tadayuki
- Nakane Kōtei
- Yamakuni Hyōbu
- Ueda Akinari
- Date Munehiro
- Fujitani Mitsue
- Tachibana Moribe
- Tomobayashi Mitsuhira
- Kume Kunitake
- Hasuda Zenmei
- Hirao Rosen
- Fujimoto Tesseki
- Hattori Nakatsune

== See also ==
- Haibutsu kishaku
- Ishihara Shiko'o
- Magokoro, a fundamental concept of kokugaku
- Mitogaku, a philosophy ideologically related to kokugaku
- Shinbutsu bunri
- Soga–Mononobe conflict, the juncture at which Buddhism supplanted Shinto as the religious foundation of the Japanese state — an event bitterly resented by the kokugakusha
- Ukehi, a prehistoric practice promoted by a number of kokugakusha
- Guido von List, European analogue advocating a similar revival of prehistoric religion
