= Takayama Torakichi =

Japanese street urchin

- 高山 寅吉
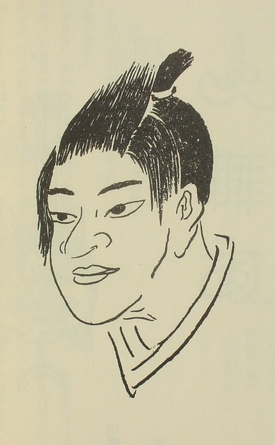
- Portrait of Takayama Torakichi from 1822

Personal details
- Born: 1806 Edo, Musashi Province, Japan
- Died: Unknown Japan

Takayama Torakichi (Japanese: 高山 寅吉; fl. 1806–1859) was a Japanese street urchin who became known in early 19th century Edo for claiming that he had visited the realm of the dead (幽り世, kakuriyo) and received training in the ways of the tengu.

He also used the name Shiraishi Heima (白石 平馬) and was sometimes called tengu kozō (天狗小僧; transl. tengu kid).

== Biography ==
Takayama Torakichi was the son of Takayama Yosōjirō (高山 與惣次郎), the poor shopkeeper of the Etchū-ya (越中屋) tobacconist in Shitaya. While he was still a boy, he left home and was eventually discovered by Hirata Atsutane in 1820. Torakichi had previously stayed with Yamazaki Yoshishige, a Buddhist essayist.

Torakichi already had a reputation for his stories, and Atsutane asked him a great many questions about his journey into the spirit world. Torakichi said that in 1811, when he was 5 years old, he was abducted outside the Kan'ei-ji by a high-ranking tengu called Sugiyama Sōjō. This Sugiyama flew with him in a magical jar to Mt. Iwama (岩間山) in Hitachi Province and Torakichi had lived there for several years as his apprentice. Torakichi had also flown around the world to places including Ihara Saikaku's Island of Women and even the Moon.

At first, Torakichi insisted on describing Sugiyama as a "tengu", but Atsutane disapproved of this term because of its Chinese origin and encouraged him to use the more Japanese-sounding yamabito (山人; lit. 'mountain man') instead. Atsutane tried to indicate this preference through the framing of some of his questions.

Torakichi explained, among other things, the martial arts, medicine, and advanced technology of these yamabito. Spirit world inventions described by Torakichi included a crank-operated apparatus for boiling water without heat (so-called "tengu boiler") and silent lethal air rifles. Many sketches and diagrams of yamabito technology were made by Atsutane's students during the interviews but few of these survive. It has been suggested that Torakichi may have become aware of the existence of air rifles via Atsutane's friend Kunitomo Ikkansai, a gunsmith who was developing his own model based on the designs of Bartolomeo Girardoni.

Torakichi ultimately lived with Atsutane for about seven years. In 1828, when Torakichi was 22 years old, he suddenly left and became a Buddhist priest.

== Later life ==
Torakichi appears again more than 30 years later in an 1859 letter sent by Atsutane's successor Hirata Kanetane to Tsuruya Ariyo of Hirosaki, a local leader of kokugaku students in the Tsugaru Domain.

You inquired about what has since happened to Torakichi. He has permanently taken up medical divination, and although he lives a worldly life, he has few desires except enjoying liquor. He has not lost his love of people, though he cares not for common people.

The date and circumstances of Torakichi's death are unknown.

== See also ==
- Koyata Katsugorō
