= Yamazaki Yoshishige =

Japanese essayist in the late Edo period

- 山崎 美成
- Born: 1796; Shitaya, Edo, Japan
- Died: August 20, 1856 (aged 59–60)
- Children: Ryōnosuke; Tetsusaburō; Teru

Japanese name
- Kanji: 山崎 美成
- Hiragana: やまざき よししげ

Yamazaki Yoshishige (Japanese: 山崎 美成; Japanese pronunciation: [ja.maꜜ.(d)za.kʲi | jo̞.ɕi̥.ɕiꜜ.ɡe̞], 1796 – August 20, 1856), sometimes also Yamazaki Yoshinari (Note: From a common misreading of his name's 成 character.) or Yamazaki Bisei (Note: On'yomi reading of the given name.), was a Japanese scholar, writer, and pharmacist during the late Edo period. He is known for writing popular encyclopedic works, as well as for hosting the Society of Curiosity Lovers, in which Bakin and other intellectuals participated. Yamazaki Yoshishige has been called one of the greatest evidential scholars of his time.

He wrote under the art names Hokuhō (北峰), Kōmondō (好問堂), Taibonkyo (耐煩居), and Sanyōkyo (三養居).

== Life ==
Yamazaki was born in 1796 in Shitaya, Edo (present-day Tokyo). He was the son of Nagasakiya, a pharmacist. In 1816 Yamazaki inherited his father's business but was unable to sustain it, preferring to focus on intellectual pursuits. He studied under the kokugaku scholar Tomokiyo Oyamada.

In 1820 he began writing entries for what would become the essay collection Kairoku (海録; Records of the Four Seas). He continued adding essays to it for another seventeen years. That same year Yamazaki Yoshishige took in Takayama Torakichi, a street urchin who claimed that he had visited the world of the dead and received training in the ways of the tengu. After unsuccessfully trying to convert the boy to Buddhism, Yamazaki let him go after gathering enough material for a book about him. Takayama Torakichi later denounced this book, claiming Yamazaki deliberately made him seem more fond of Buddhist teachings than he really was.

Yamazaki Yoshishige was friends with the poet, satirist and bakufu bureaucrat Ōta Nanpo. They wrote letters to each other, as well as exchanged books. Toward the end of Ōta Nanpo's life, c. 1823, Yamazaki prepared a complete catalogue of Ōta's personal library. The original copy of the catalogue is stored in the National Diet Library of Japan.

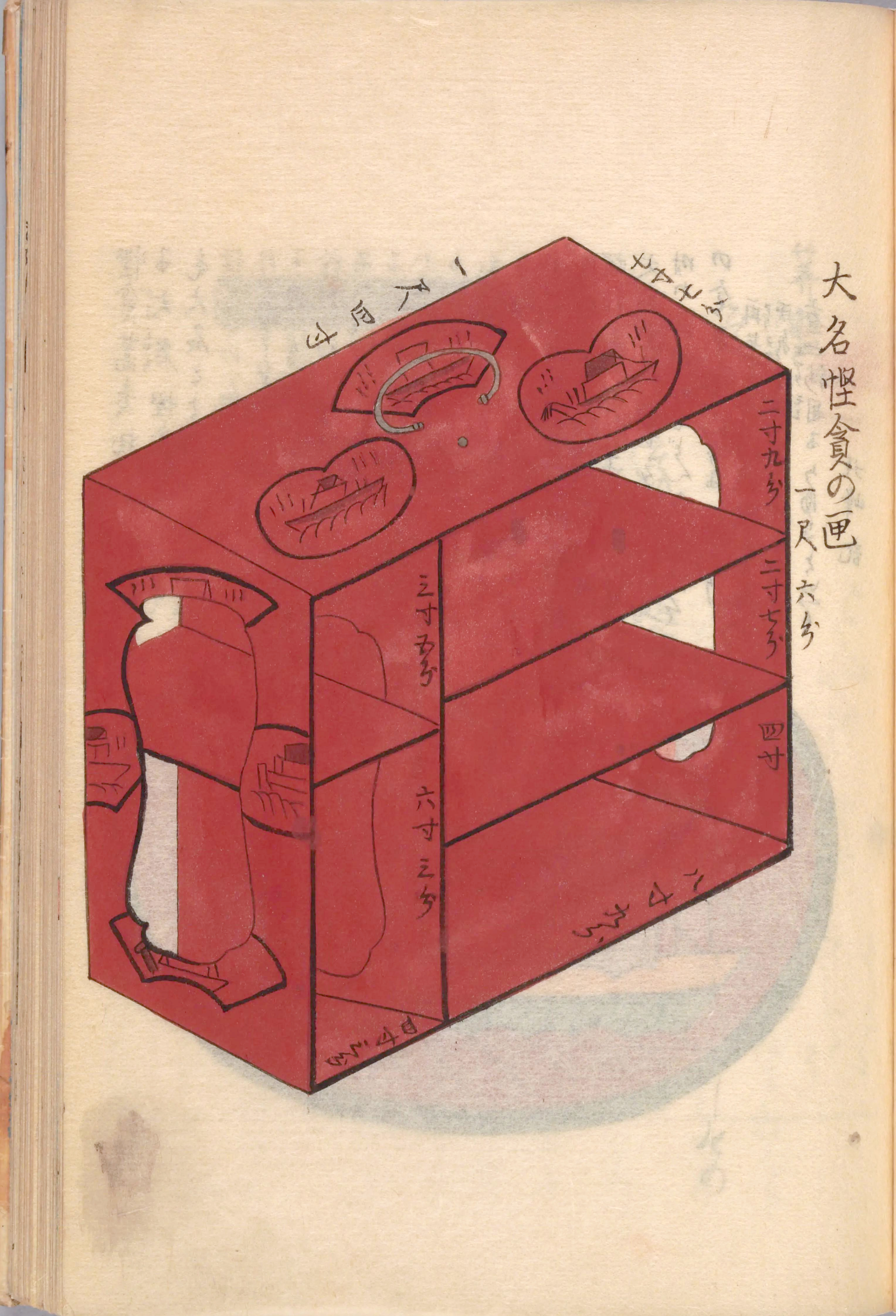
The food carrier that started the dispute between Yamazaki and Bakin

From May 5, 1824 to November 13, 1825, Yamazaki Yoshishige participated in the antiquarian salon called the Society of Curiosity Lovers (耽奇会, Tankikai) as its founding member, host and main chronicler. The meetings were conducted in the spirit of the popular at the time evidential scholarship, or kōshō (考證): the members brought particularly old, unusual or exotic items from their collections for erudite discussion based on direct observation of the items. Some of the prominent attendees were Bakin, Tani Bunchō and Nishihara Sakō.

One such meeting led to a loud and lasting conflict between Yamazaki and Bakin, which eventually contributed to the dissolution of the Society of Curiosity Lovers. On March 13, 1825, during the twelfth meeting of the society, the new member Bunpōtei Bunpō brought an old food carrier called a daimyō kendon (大名慳貪). The name of the item was obscure and it sparked an intense discussion between Yamazaki Yoshishige and Bakin over its origin and meaning. The discussion continued in correspondence, which eventually devolved into accusations of rudeness and disrespect, their friendship never fully recovering afterwards. Bakin later lamented: "To think our friendship would deteriorate so... How deeply I sigh" (交遊不全如此。浩嘆何堪).

Before their quarrel, Yamazaki and Bakin also organized the Toen Society (兎園会, Toenkai), named after an ancient Chinese rock garden. The Toen Society convened twelve times, starting January 1825. While it shared many of its members with the Society of Curiosity Lovers, its focus was instead on the sharing and discussion of strange tales, documents, and reports.

In the latter part of his life, Yamazaki Yoshishige frequently had no way to economically sustain himself. He had to sell his books and other personal possessions and to rely on the good will of his friends and acquaintances to feed himself and his three children. Particularly difficult were the years of the Great Tenpō famine, when economic hardship had penetrated nearly all social levels. Yamazaki described his life in poverty during those years in Kanasugi Diary (金杉日記, Kanasugi nikki), written in 1837–38.

In 1854 Yamazaki Yoshishige finished writing the Story of the 47 Loyal Retainers (赤穂義士伝一夕話), illustrated by Hashimoto Gyokuran, which narrates the complete course of the Akō incident and provides biographies of all the forty-seven rōnin involved. This work is historically important for bringing the forty-seven rōnin to the attention of a much wider audience and restoring their historicity in printed books. One year later, Yamazaki followed the book with the Essays on the 47 Loyal Retainers (赤穂義士随筆), which focused on describing the artefacts of the Akō rōnin.

Yamazaki Yoshishige died on August 20, 1856. He was given the posthumous Buddhist name Bisen Tesshō Koji (美仙徹成居士).

== Works ==
- 麓の花 [Flowers at the Foot of the Mountain], 1819
- 平児代答 [Responses from Torakichi], 1820
- 文教温古 [Inquiry into Literary Education], 1828
- 琉球入貢紀略 [Abridged Account of Ryukyuans Visiting Japan to Pay Tributes], 1832
- 海録 [Records of the Four Seas], 1837
- 金杉日記 [Kanasugi Diary], 1838
- 赤穂義士伝一夕話 [Story of the 47 Loyal Retainers], 1854
- 赤穂義士随筆 [Essays on the 47 Loyal Retainers], 1855
- 大地震暦年考 [Chronicle of Great Earthquakes], 1856
