= Kunitomo Ikkansai =

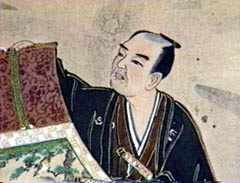
- Born: November 21, 1778; Kunitomo, Nagahama, Shiga
- Died: December 26, 1840
- Occupations: gunsmith, inventor

Kunitomo Ikkansai (国友 一貫斎; November 21, 1778 – December 26, 1840), real name Kunitomo Tōbee Yoshimasa (国友 藤兵衛 能當), was a Japanese gunsmith and inventor of the late Edo period, who, after having spent several months in Edo, where he could get accustomed with Dutch wares, built Japan's first reflective telescope in 1831. It was of the Gregorian type and had a magnification of 60. He used it to make very detailed studies of sun spots and lunar topography. Four of his telescopes remain to this day.

In the early 19th century, Kunitomo became an acquaintance of the Shinto theologian and nativist Hirata Atsutane, and was in regular contact with him. Around this time, Kunitomo was involved in the development of firearm manufacturing methods. Circa 1820, he designed a pneumatic rifle based on his studies of European air rifle technology conducted through the Dutch trading post at Dejima.

== Other uses of the name ==
- 6100 Kunitomoikkansai, a main belt asteroid discovered in 1991, is named after Kunitomo Ikkansai.
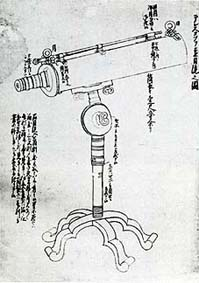
Kunitomo's reflecting telescope, 1831.

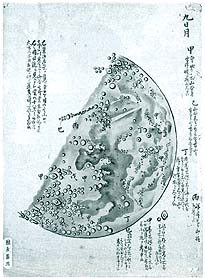
Observation of the moon by Kunitomo in 1836.

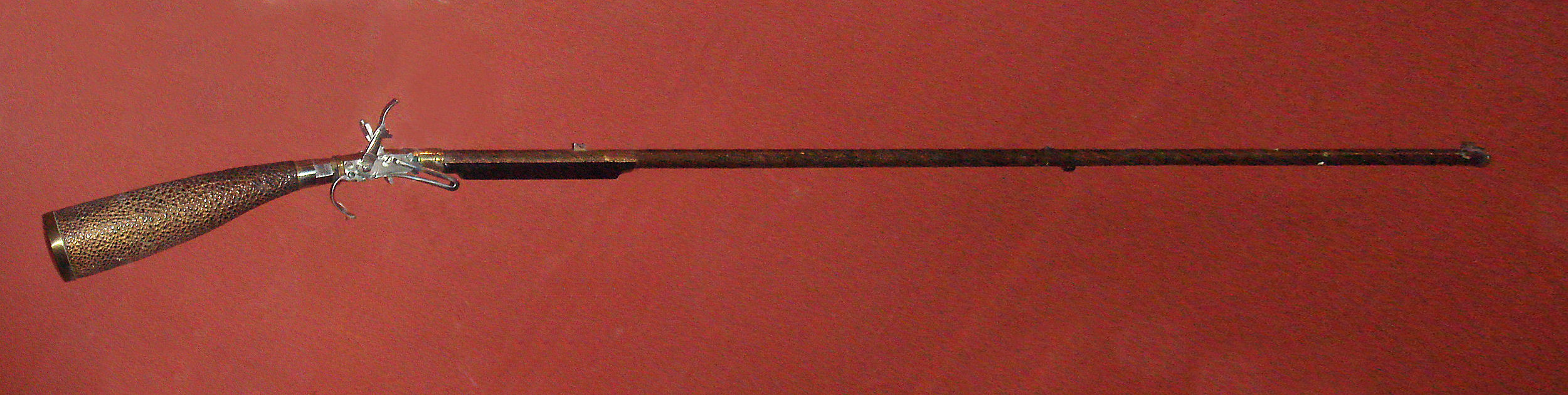
Air gun developed by Kunitomo, circa 1820–1830.

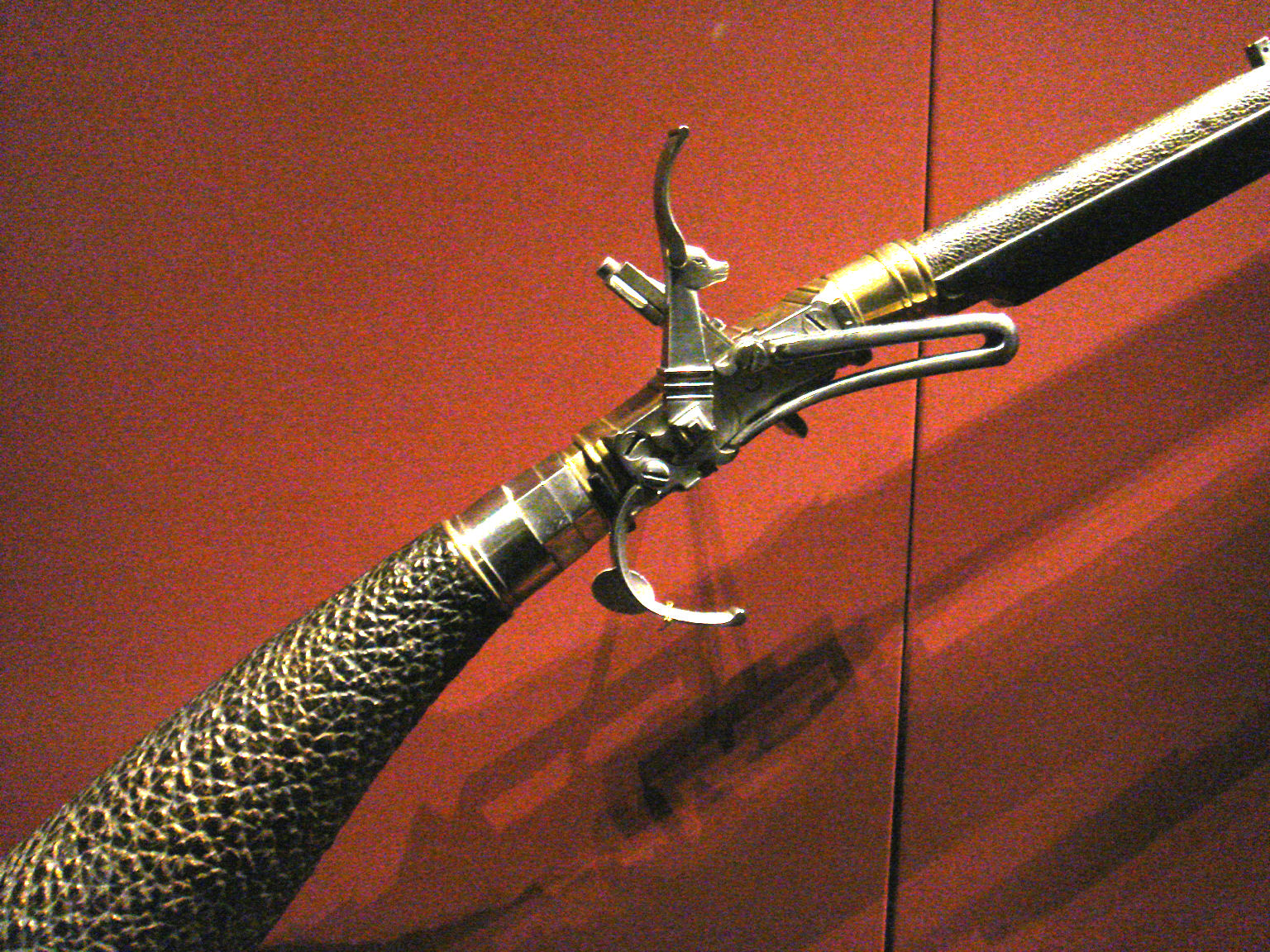
Air gun trigger mechanism.
