= Koyata Katsugorō =

- 小谷田 勝五郎

Personal details
- Born: November 10, 1815 Nakano, Musashi Province, Japan
- Died: January 5, 1869 (aged 53) Nakano, Musashi Province, Japan

Koyata Katsugorō (Japanese: 小谷田 勝五郎; 1815–1869) was a Japanese farmer who claimed to be able to recall one of his past lives. He was studied by the kokugaku scholar Hirata Atsutane in the course of his research into the afterlife.

== Biography ==
Katsugorō was born the son of Koyata Genzō (小谷田 源蔵) in the village of Nakano (中野).

In 1822, when Katsugorō was 7 years old, he told his parents that in his past life he had been a boy named Suzaki Tōzō (須崎 藤蔵) who died of smallpox in 1810. He also described things he had seen in the intermediate state before returning to the realm of the living. His story became well-known after it was discovered that a boy named Suzaki Tōzō from the village of Hodokubo (程久保) had indeed died of smallpox in 1810. An official report on the apparent miracle was submitted by the reeve of Nakano village, Tamon Denpachirō (多門 伝八郎).

In 1823, Hirata Atsutane heard about Katsugorō's stories and invited the boy to Edo for questioning. Katsugorō and his father Genzō traveled to Atsutane's house in Edo, where Katsugorō was given candy and spent a day playing with Atsutane's daughter. Just before leaving, he timidly told his story which was recorded verbatim by Ban Nobutomo. Others present included Atsutane's disciple Takayama Torakichi.

Atsutane was especially interested in Katsugorō's description of the realm of the dead, where he vaguely remembered an old man in black robes leading him across a surreal landscape at twilight. Later that year, Atsutane compiled the information he had gathered into a book titled An Account of the Revival of Katsugorō (勝五郎再生記聞, Katsugorō saisei kibun).

In 1825, Katsugorō enrolled as a student at Atsutane's private academy, the Ibukinoya. He later gave up his studies and returned home to Nakano village where he spent the rest of his life as a farmer. He died in 1869.

In the 1880s, Katsugorō's sister Tsune (常) tried to erect a monument to him. A draft of the inscription was prepared, but the monument itself was never completed.
