= Air gun =

Device that uses compressed air to fire projectiles

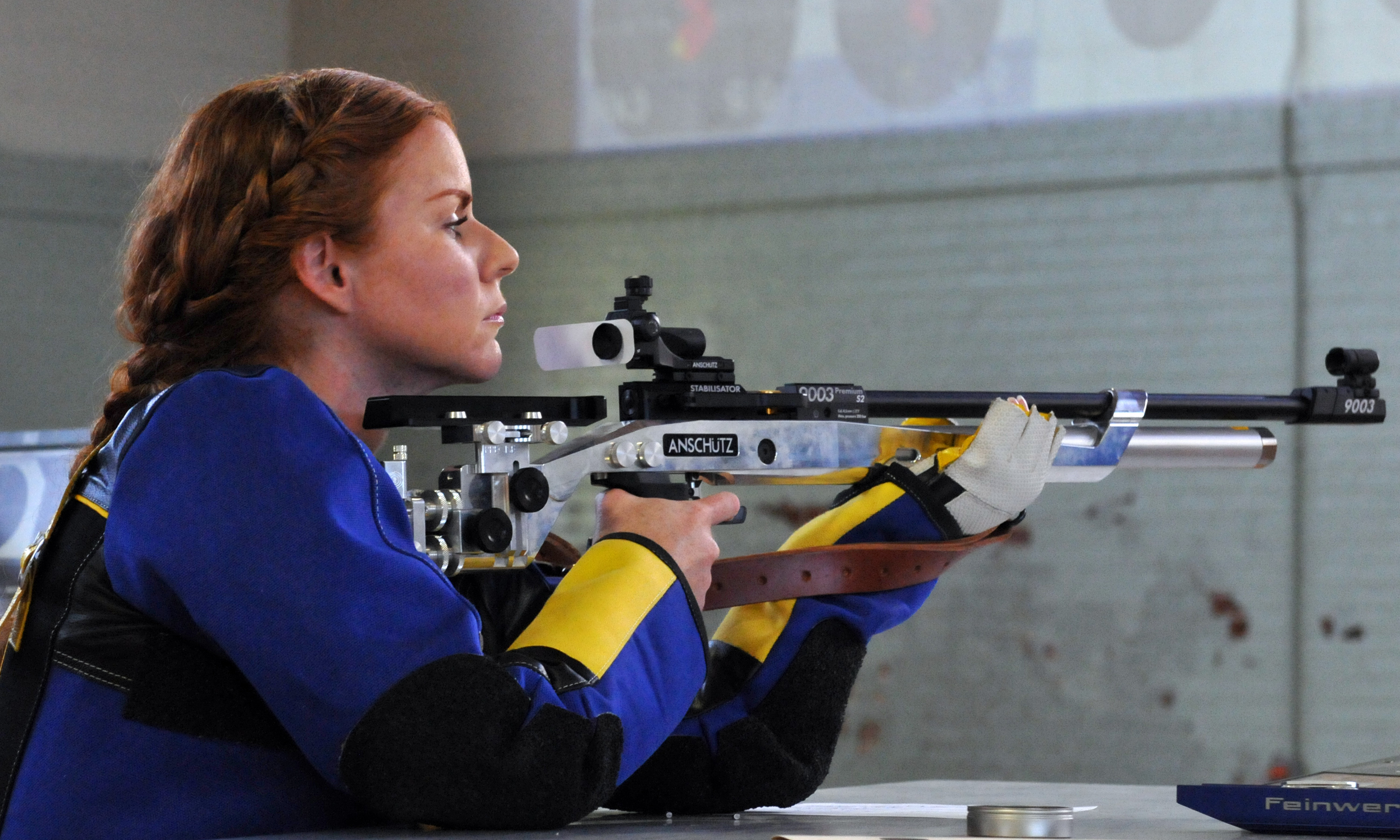
A para-athlete competing with a match air rifle

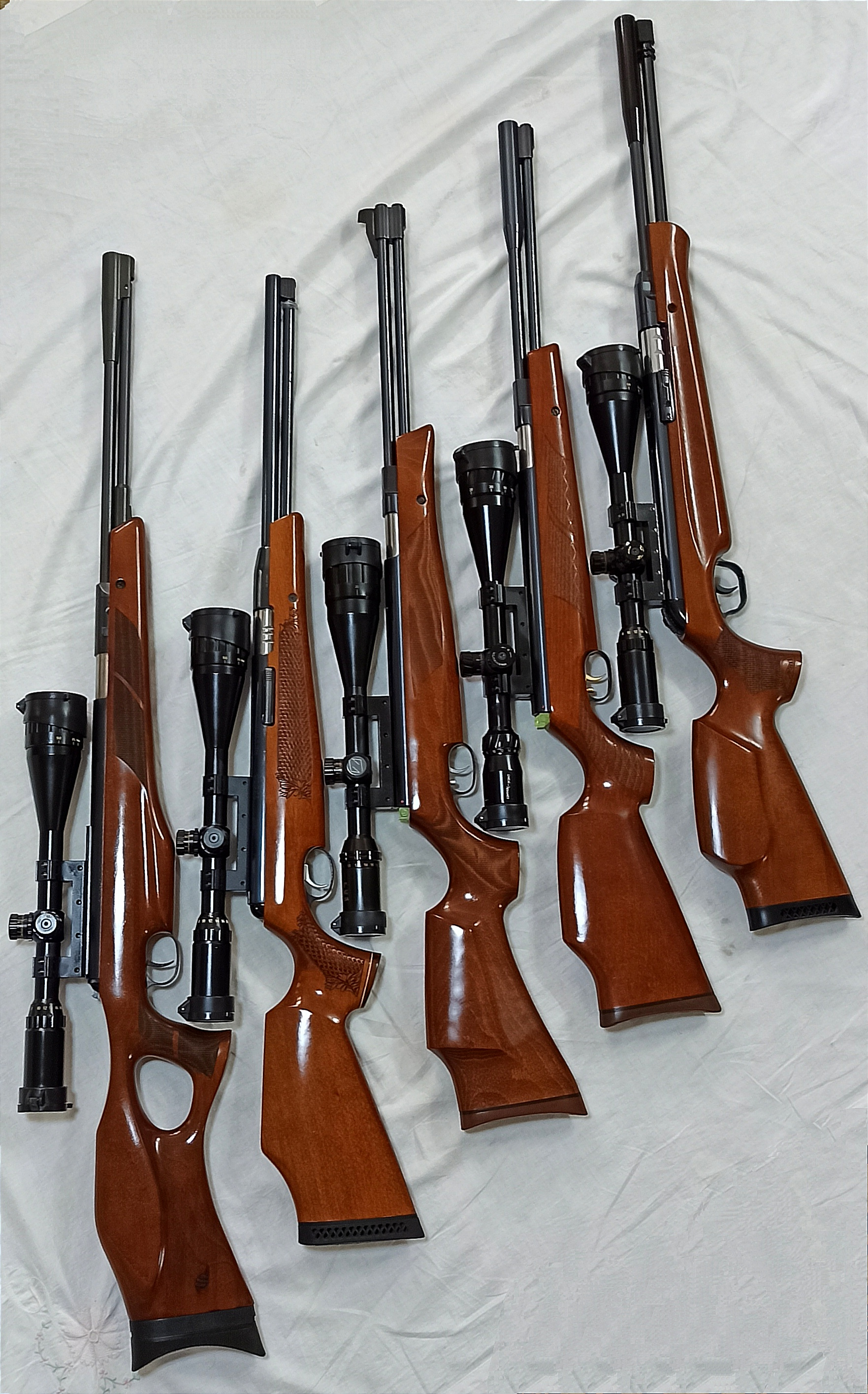
A collection of lever-action, spring-piston air rifles

An air gun or airgun is a gun that uses compressed air or other pressurized gases to fire projectiles, reminiscent of the principle behind the ancient blowgun. This is in contrast to a firearm, which shoots projectiles using pressure generated via combustion of a chemical propellant, most often black powder in antique firearms and smokeless powder in modern firearms.

Air guns come in both long gun (air rifle) and handgun (air pistol) forms. Both types typically propel metallic projectiles that are either diabolo-shaped pellets or spherical shots called BBs, although in recent years Minié ball-shaped cylindro-conoidal projectiles called slugs are becoming more popular. Certain types of air guns (usually air rifles) may also launch fin-stabilized projectile such as darts (e.g., tranquilizer guns) or hollow-shafted arrows (so-called "airbows").

The air guns were first developed in the 16th century, and have since been used in hunting, shooting sports, and even in warfare. There are three different power sources for modern air guns, depending on the design: spring-piston, pneumatic or bottled compressed gas (most commonly carbon dioxide and recently nitrogen).

== History ==
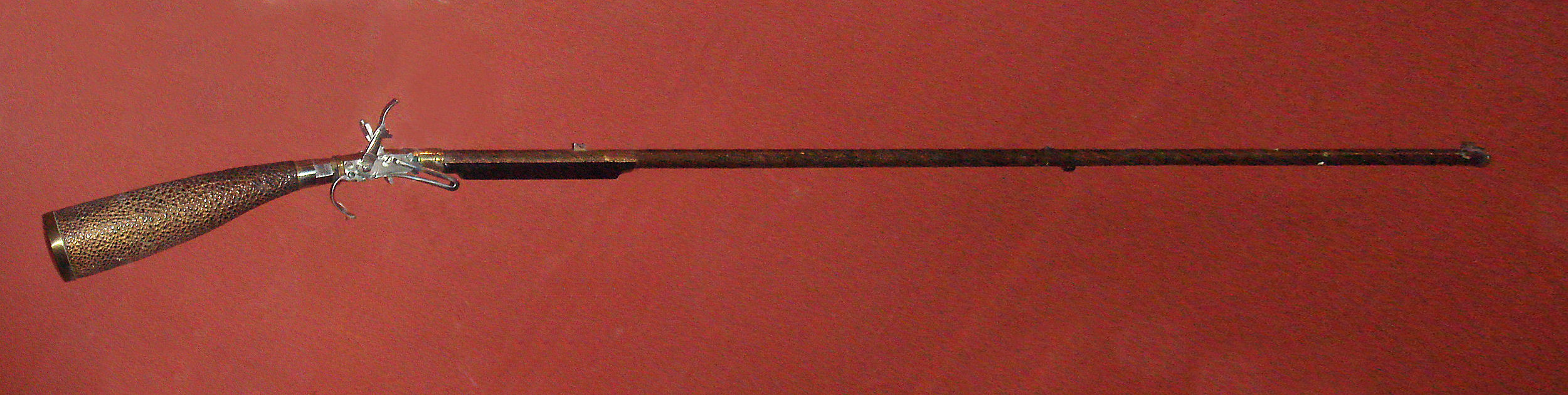
Kunitomo air gun developed by the Japanese inventor Kunitomo Ikkansai, c. 1820–1830

Air guns represent the oldest pneumatic technology. The oldest existing mechanical air gun dates back to about 1580, and is currently kept in the Livrustkammaren Museum in Stockholm. This is approximately what most historians recognize as the beginning of the modern air gun.

Throughout 17th to 19th century, air guns in .30 to .51 calibers were used to hunt big game, deer and wild boar. These air rifles were charged using a pump to fill an air reservoir and produced velocities from 650 to 1,000 ft/s (200 to 300 m/s). They were also used in warfare, the most recognized example being the Girandoni air rifle, a repeating rifle used by Austria in the 1788 war against Turkey.

At that time, they had compelling advantages over the muzzleloader firearms of the day. For example, air guns could be discharged in wet weather and rain (unlike both matchlock and flintlock muskets), and discharged much faster than muzzle-loading guns. Moreover, they were quieter than a firearm of a similar caliber and produced no muzzle flash or smoke cloud when fired. Thus, they did not give away the shooter's position or obscure the shooter's view, unlike the black powder muskets of the 18th and 19th centuries.

In the hands of skilled soldiers, they gave the military a distinct advantage. France, Austria and other nations had special sniper detachments using air rifles, mostly Jäger (infantry). The Austrian 1779 model was named Windbüchse (literally "wind rifle" in German). The gun was developed in 1768 or 1769 by the Tyrolean Ladins watchmaker, mechanic and gunsmith Bartholomäus Girardoni (1744–1799) and is sometimes referred to as the Girandoni air rifle or Girardoni air gun in literature (the name is also spelled "Girandony", "Giradoni" or "Girardoni".). Adopted by the Austrian leadership in 1779, the Windbüchse was about 4 ft (1.2 m) long and weighed 10 pounds (4.5 kg), about the same size and mass as a conventional musket. The air reservoir was a removable, club-shaped, butt. The Windbüchse carried twenty-two .51 caliber (13 mm) lead balls in a tubular magazine. A skilled shooter could fire off one magazine in about thirty seconds. A shot from this air gun could penetrate a one-inch-thick (2.5 cm) wooden board at a hundred paces, an effect roughly equal to that of a modern 9×19mm or .45 ACP caliber pistol.

Circa 1820, the Japanese inventor Kunitomo Ikkansai developed various manufacturing methods for guns, and also created an air gun based on the study of Western knowledge ("rangaku") acquired from the Dutch in Dejima.

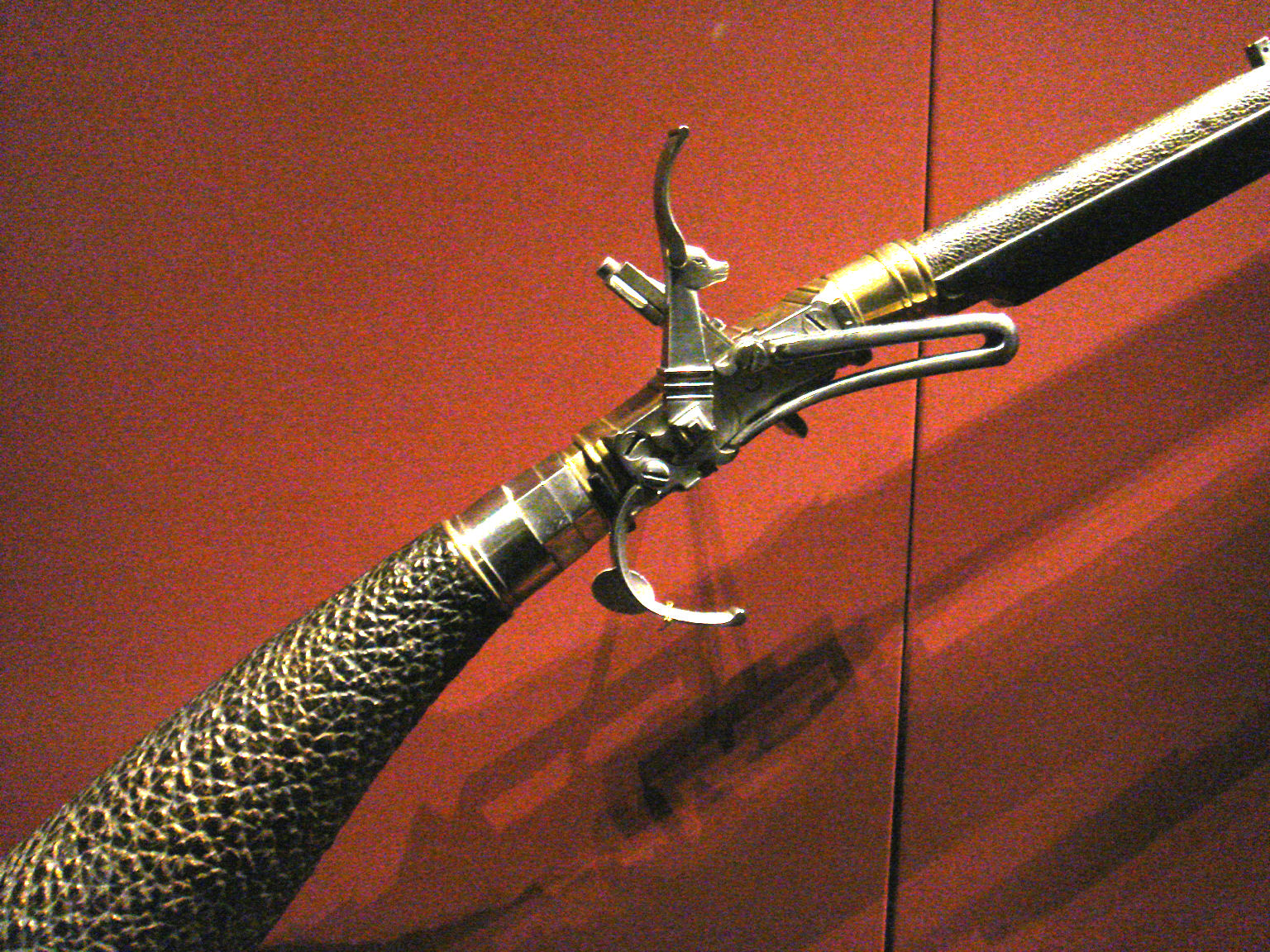
Kunitomo air gun trigger mechanism

The Lewis and Clark Expedition (1804) carried a reservoir air gun, very likely the Girardoni, as it held 22 round balls of .46 caliber in a tubular magazine mounted on the side of the barrel. The butt of the gun served as the air reservoir and had a working pressure of 800 psi (55 bar). The rifle was said to be capable of 22 aimed shots per minute and had a rifled bore of 0.452 in (11.5 mm) and a groove diameter 0.462 in (11.7 mm).

One of the first commercially successful and mass-produced air guns was manufactured by the William F. Markham's Markham Air Rifle Company in Plymouth, Michigan, US. Their first model air gun was the wooden Challenger, marketed in 1886. In response, Clarence Hamilton from the neighboring Plymouth Air Rifle Company (later renamed to Daisy Manufacturing Company in 1895) marketed their all-metal Daisy BB Gun in early 1888, which prompted Markham to respond with their Chicago model in 1888 followed by the King model in 1890. The Chicago model was sold by Sears, Roebuck for 73 cents in its catalog. In 1928, the name of the Markham company was changed to King Air Rifle Company after the company was purchased by Daisy in 1916 after decades of intense competition, and continued to manufacture the "King" model air rifle until 1935 before ceasing operation altogether in the 1940s.

From the 1890s onwards, air rifles were used in Birmingham, England for competitive target shooting. Matches were held in public houses and working men's clubs, which sponsored shooting teams. This often took the form of Bell Target shooting, where the competitor aims to ring a bell by shooting through a small hole in a steel plate. Prizes, such as a leg of mutton for the winning team, were paid for by the losing team. During this time, over 4,000 air rifle clubs and associations existed across Great Britain, with as many as 1,600 in Birmingham alone. During this time, the air gun was associated with poaching because it could deliver a shot without a significant muzzle report.

== Use ==
Air guns are used for hunting (small to medium game), pest control, recreational shooting (commonly known as plinking) and competitive sports such as the Olympic 10 m air rifle and 10 m air pistol events. Field target (FT) is a competitive form of metallic silhouette shooting in which the targets are animal-shaped steel targets with a "kill zone" cut-out. Hunter field target (HFT) is a variation, using identical equipment, but with differing rules. The distances FT and HFT competitions are shot at range between 7.3 and 41.1 metres (24 and 135 ft) for HFT & 7.3 and 50.29 metres (24.0 and 165.0 ft) for FT, with varying sizes of "reducers" being used to increase or decrease the size of the kill zone. In the UK, competition power limits are set at the legal maximum for an unlicensed air rifle, i.e. 12 ft⋅lbf (16 J). Air rifle benchrest is an international shooting sport where the objective is to hit a (small) bulls eye target at 25 m (27.34 yd) shooting distance. There are two divisions ARLV 12 ft⋅lbf (16.27 J) and ARHV 20 ft⋅lbf (27.12 J).

The increasing affordability of higher-power pre-charged pneumatic (PCP) rifles has allowed large projectiles and further target distance for competition purposes. For instance, the Extreme Benchrest competition held annually in Green Valley, Arizona allows calibers up to .30 inches (7.6 mm) at 75 yd (68.58 m) while the Big Bore Benchrest arm of the same competition at other localities engages targets at 35 to 300 yards (32 to 274 m).

== Powerplant ==
The component of an airgun that provides the gas pressure needed to propel projectiles is called its powerplant, which uses internally stored pressurized gas; and compressed gas (most commonly CO_{2}), which uses external sources of pressurized gas.

=== Spring-piston ===
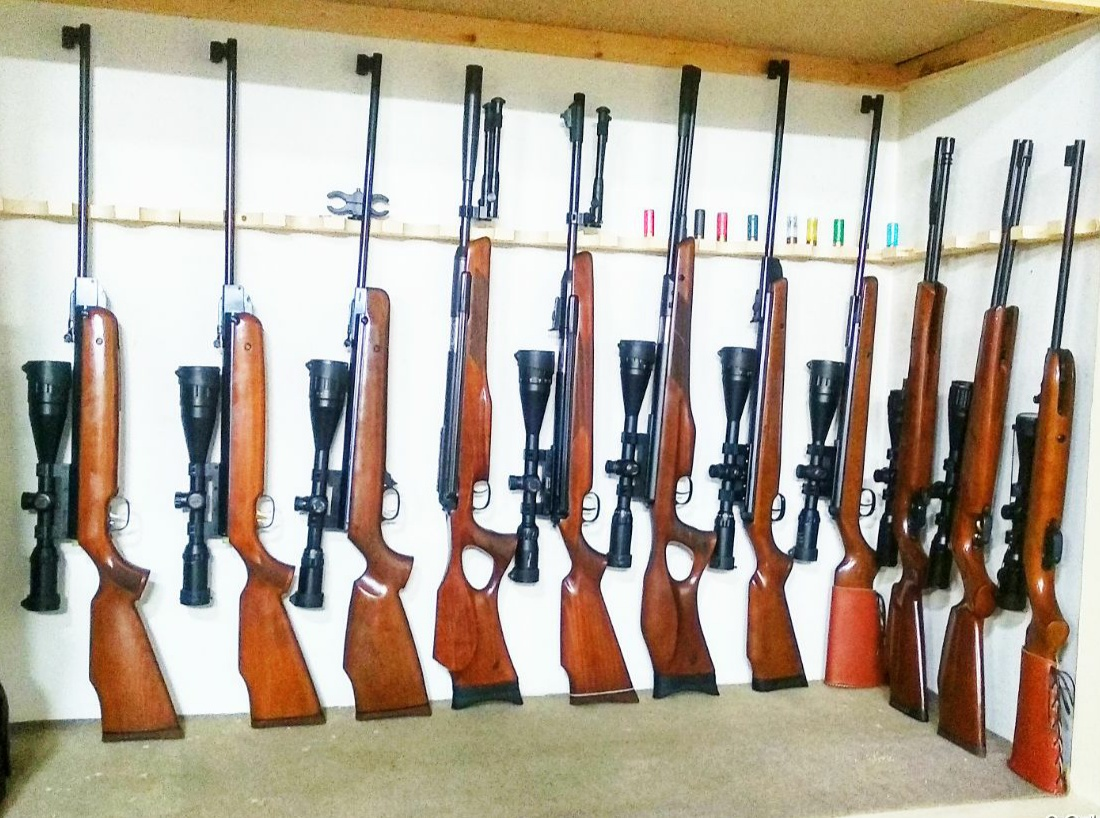
Variety of different types & models of spring piston & gas ram air guns

A spring-piston air gun (also known as a spring gun or simply a "springer") operates by means of a spring-loaded piston pump assembly contained within a compression chamber separate from the gun barrel. Traditionally, a grease-lubricated steel coil spring is used as the powerplant main spring. Before shooting, the user needs to manually cock the gun by flexing a lever connected to the pump assembly, which pulls the pump piston rearwards and compresses the main spring until the rear of the piston engages the sear. When shooting, the trigger is pulled and disengages the sear, allowing the main spring to decompress and release its stored elastic potential energy, pushing the piston forward, thereby compressing the air in the pump cylinder. Because the pump outlet (located to the front of the pump) is directly behind the pellet seated in the barrel chamber, once the air pressure has risen enough to overcome the static friction and/or barrel restriction holding back the pellet, the pellet is propelled forward by an expanding column of pressurized air. All this takes place in a fraction of a second, during which the air undergoes adiabatic heating to several hundred degrees and then cools as the air expands. This can also cause a phenomenon referred as "dieseling", where flammable substances in the compression chamber (e.g., petroleum-based lubricant) can be ignited by the compression heat like in a diesel engine, and lead to an afterburner effect with (often unpredictable) additional thrusts. This often results in combustion smoke coming out of the muzzle and potential pressure damage to the rubber O-ring seals inside the gun. Dieseling can be made to occur intentionally to increase power, by coating the pellet with lubricant or petroleum jelly, although this may result in damage to the breech seal.

Most spring-piston guns are single-shot breechloaders by nature, but multiple-shot repeaters with magazine feeders have been introduced in recent years by manufacturers such as Gamo, Umarex and Hatsan.

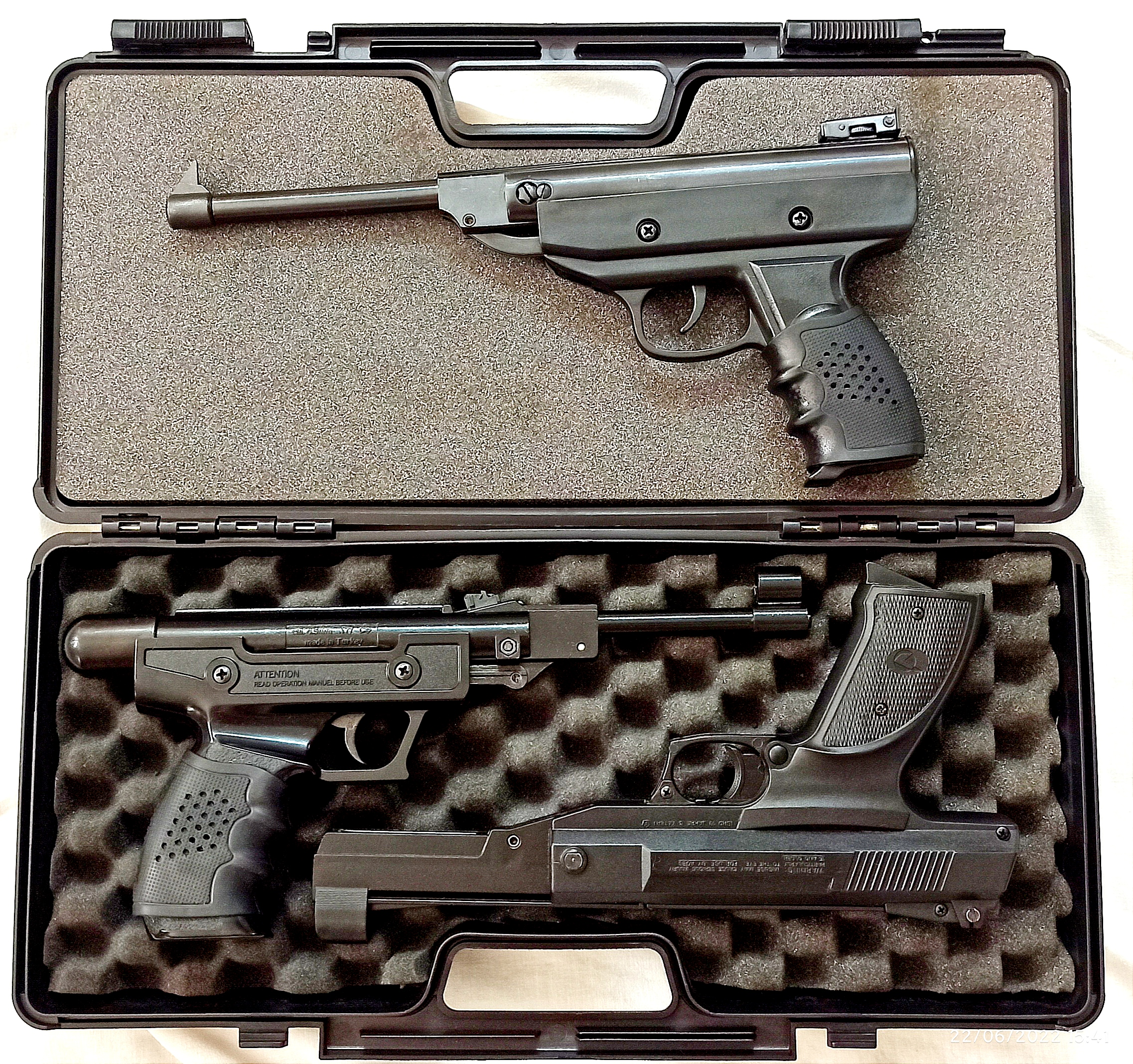
Spring Piston Air Pistols

Spring-piston guns, especially the high-powered "magnum" guns, are able to achieve muzzle velocities exceeding the speed of sound. The effort required for the cocking stroke is proportional to the designed power of the gun, with higher muzzle velocities requiring a stiffer spring and hence a greater cocking effort. Spring-piston guns have a practical upper limit of 1,250 ft/s (380 m/s) for .177 cal (4.5 mm) pellets, as higher velocities cause unstable pellet flight and loss of accuracy. This is due to the extreme buffeting caused when the pellet reaches and surpasses transonic speed, then slows back down and goes through sound barrier again, which is more than enough to destabilize the pellet's flight. Shortly after leaving the barrel, the supersonic pellet falls back below the speed of sound and the shock wave overtakes the pellet, causing its flight stability to be disrupted. Drag increases disproportionately as pellet velocity increases, so it is generally better to increase pellet weight to keep velocities subsonic in high-powered guns. Many shooters find that velocities in the 800–900 ft/s (240–270 m/s) range offer an ideal balance between power and accuracy.

Spring guns are typically cocked by one of the following mechanisms:

- Break-barrel – like a break action firearm, the barrel is hinged at the junction with the receiver and is flexed downwards to expose the breech and serves as the cocking lever
- Fixed-barrel – the barrel is fixed to the receiver, and the cocking is done with a separate cocking lever
  - Underlever – the cocking lever is located underneath the barrel or the receiver and is flexed downwards during cocking
  - Sidelever – the cocking lever is located to the side (usually the right side) of the receiver and is flexed sideways during cocking
  - Overlever – the cocking lever is located above the barrel and is flexed upwards during cocking, seen in some air pistols
- Motorized cocking powered by a rechargeable battery (rare)

Spring-piston guns, especially high-powered ("magnum") models, do still recoil as a result of the mainspring pushing the piston forward. Although the recoil is less than that of some cartridge firearms, it can make the gun difficult to shoot accurately as the spring recoil is in effect while the pellet is still within the barrel. Spring gun recoil also has a sharp forward component, caused by the piston hitting the front end of the pump chamber when the spring has fully decompressed. These rapid double-jerking movements are known to damage scopes not rated for spring gun usage. In addition, the spring often has unpredictable collateral transverse vibrations as well as torquing, both of which can cause accuracy to suffer. These vibrations can be controlled by adding features like close-fitting spring guides or by aftermarket tuning done by gunsmiths who specialize in air gun modifications, a common one being the addition of high viscosity tenacious grease to the spring, which lubricates and serves to dampen vibration.

The better quality spring guns can have very long service lives, being simple to maintain and repair. Because they deliver the same mechanical energy output on each shot, external ballistics are quite consistent. Most Olympic air gun competitions through the 1970s and into the 1980s were shot with spring-piston guns, often of the opposing-piston recoil-eliminating type. Beginning in the 1980s, guns powered by compressed/liquefied carbon dioxide began to dominate the competition. Today, the guns used at the highest levels of competition are powered by compressed air.

==== Gas spring ====
Some newer generation air guns incorporate a gas spring (commonly referred to as a gas piston, gas ram, gas strut or nitro piston) instead of a mechanical spring. The spring itself is essentially a stand-alone enclosed piston pump without outlets and with pressurized air or inert gas (such as nitrogen) held tightly sealed within the cylinder. When the gun is cocked, the gas inside the cylinder gets further compressed by the piston, stores potential energy and acts as a pneumatic accumulator. Gas spring units require higher precision to manufacture since they require a low-friction sliding seal that can withstand the high pressures within when cocked. The advantages of the gas spring include the ability to keep the gun cocked and ready to fire for extended periods of time without long-term spring fatigue, no twisting torque (caused by coil spring expanding) exerted onto the gun, smoother recoil pattern and faster "lock time" (the time between pulling the trigger and the pellet being discharged), which all result in more consistent accuracy. Gas springs perform more reliably in cold climates than coil springs, because metallic coil springs need to be coated with lubricating grease which often thickens in low temperatures causing the gun to "freeze up". Gas springs also have less lateral and longitudinal vibrations than coil springs, hence are usually less "hold-sensitive", making it easier to achieve consistent shot groupings.

=== Pneumatic ===
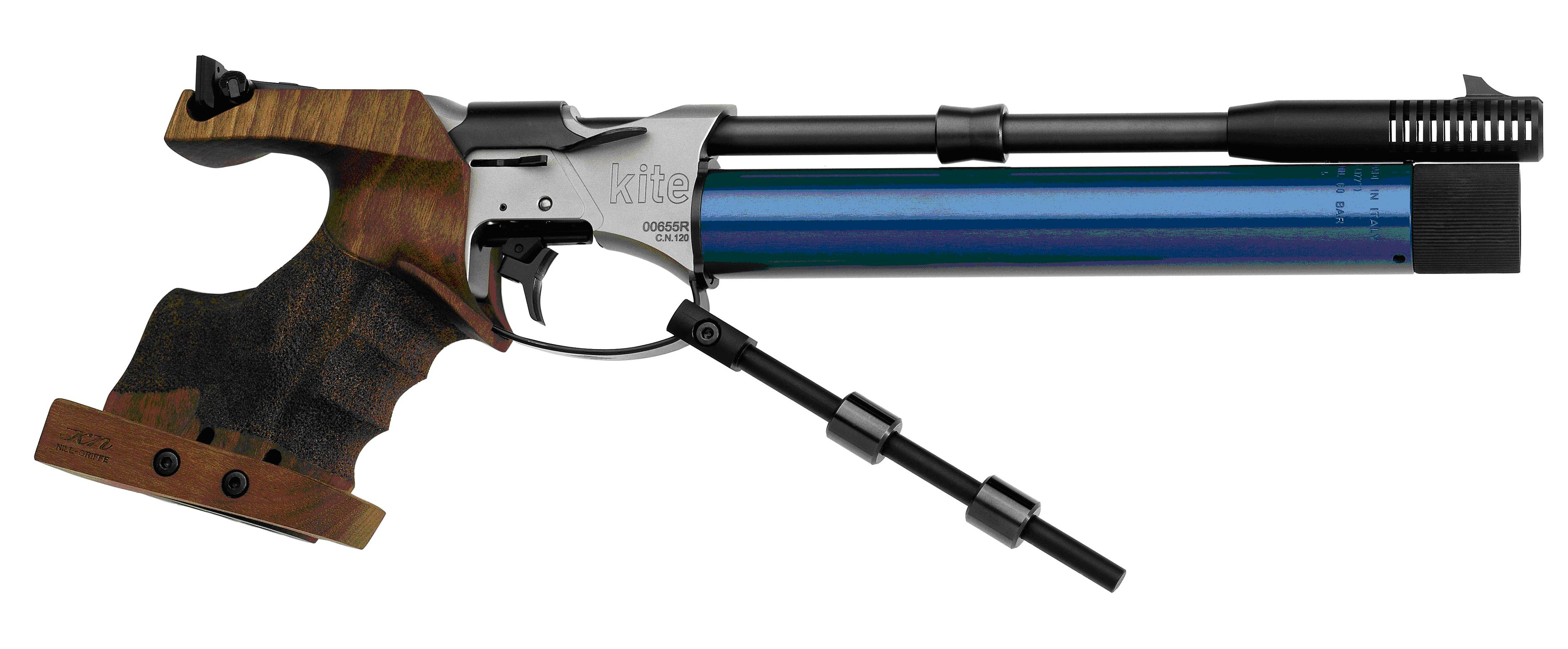
An example of a Benelli Kite pre-charged pneumatic air pistol, as used in 10 metre air pistol ISSF shooting events

Pneumatic airguns propel the projectiles by utilizing the pneumatic potential energy within compressed air, which is pressurized beforehand and stored inside the gun, and then released through valves during shooting. Single-stroke and multi-stroke pump guns utilize an on-board hand pump to pressurize air in an internal reservoir tank, while pre-charged pneumatic guns' reservoirs are filled from an external source using either a high-pressure stand pump or by decanting air from a larger diving cylinder.

==== Pump pneumatic ====
Pump pneumatic air guns, or pump guns, use a lever-operated onboard air pump to pressurize an internal reservoir, and then discharge the stored compressed air during shooting. Depending on the design, pump guns can be either single-stroke or multi-stroke.

- In single-stroke pneumatic air guns (also known as "single pump") a single motion of the cocking lever is all that is required to mechanically compress the air. The single-pump system has always dominated the casual plinking market, and is usually found in target rifles and pistols, where the higher muzzle energy of a multi-stroke pumping system is not required. Single-stroke pneumatic rifles dominated the national and international ISSF 10 metre air rifle shooting events from the 1970s to the 1990s, until being outperformed by the introduction of pre-charged pneumatic (PCP) guns (discussed below).
- Multi-stroke pneumatic air guns (also known as "multi-pump") use multiple pumpings to achieve variable power levels in order to adapt for both long or short-range shooting. These air guns are usually single-shot, where each shot requires approximately 5 strokes. However, up to five shots are possible, usually requiring approximately 10 to 20 strokes, as long as the air reservoir is capable of storing higher pressure. For safety reasons, most multi-stroke guns are usually designed to have their pump lever jam when the reservoir has reached its maximum pressure limit, so the user can no longer pump the gun until it's discharged. The maximum pressure limit for the reservoir is approximately 20 to 30 strokes.

==== Pre-charged pneumatic ====
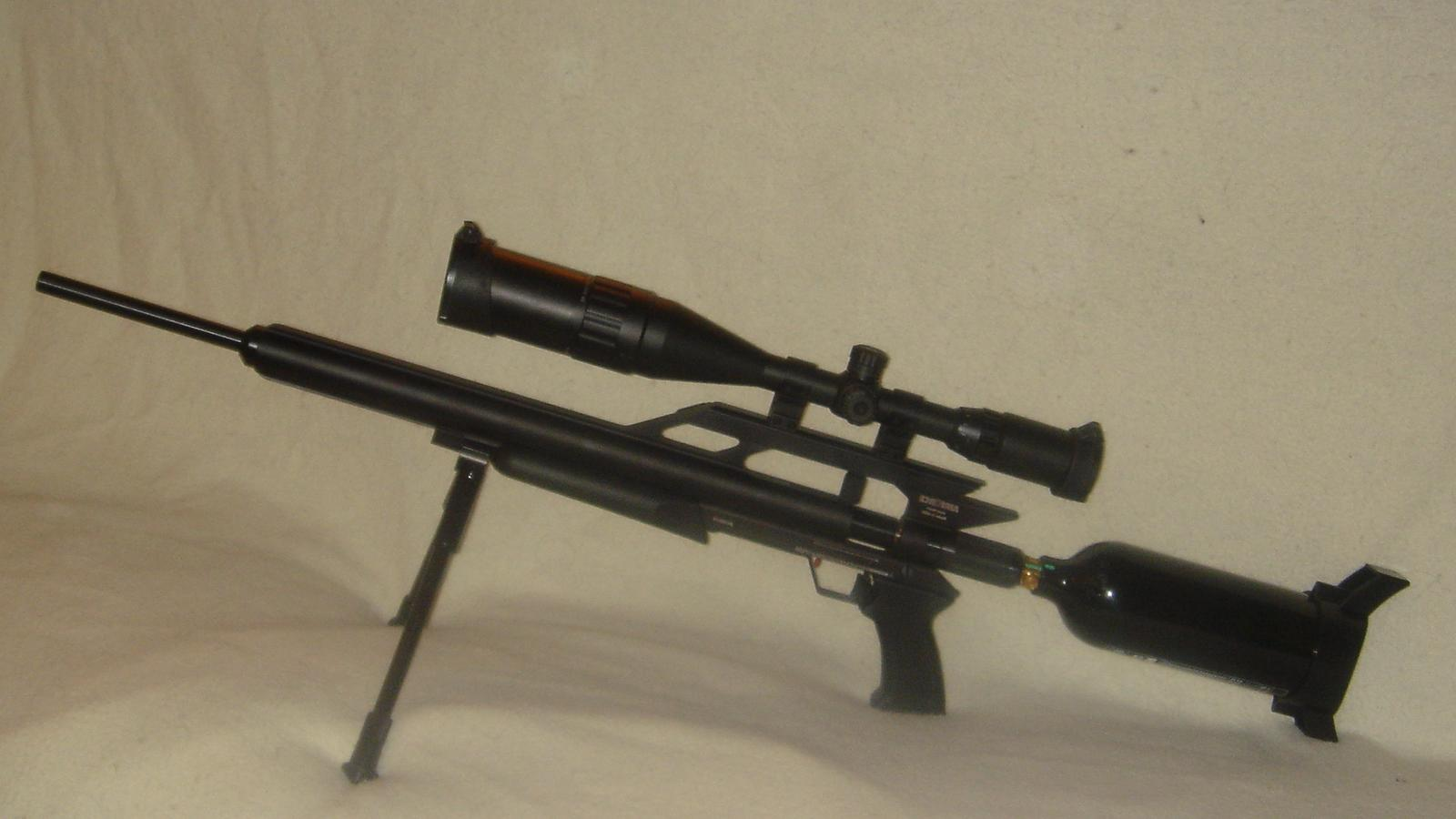
Airforce Condor, one of the most powerful PCP air rifles on the market

Pre-charged pneumatic air guns or PCP have their internal reservoir pre-filled from an external air source (such as a diving cylinder or air compressor, or by manual charging with a high-pressure stand pump), and remain pressurized until depleted after repeated shooting. During shooting, the hammer strikes the reservoir's release valve, allowing a set volume of the pressurized air to be discharged into the chamber and propel the projectile. Depending on the release valve design, PCP air guns can be categorized into two types – unregulated and regulated (which has either a mechanical or electronic regulator valve). In addition to compressed air, custom PCP models using compressed pure nitrogen and even compressed helium have also been recently developed.

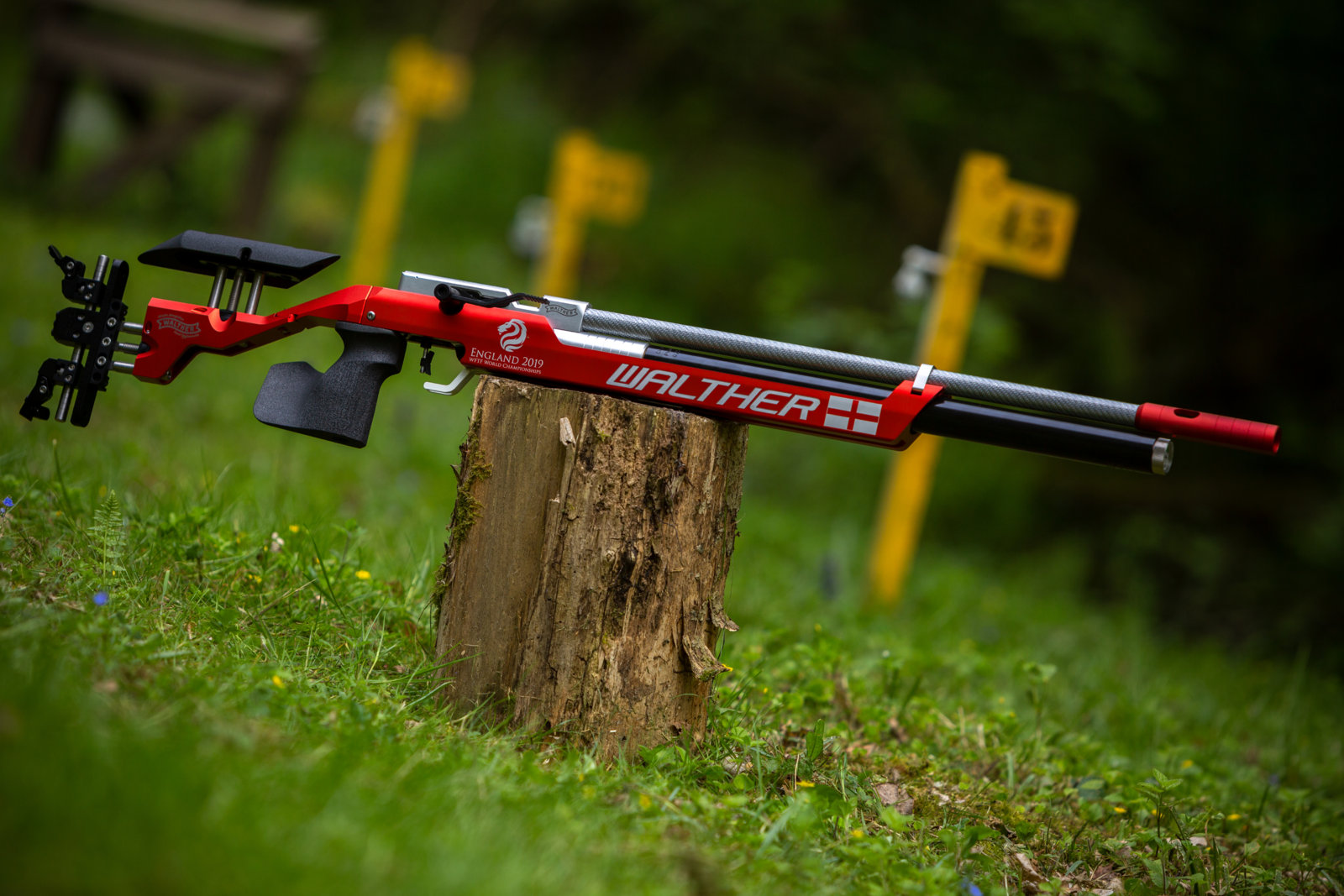
Field Target variant of a Walther LG400 PCP Air Rifle.

Because of the need for cylinders or charging systems, PCP guns have higher initial costs but much lower operating costs when compared to CO_{2} rifles, and have superior performance over ordinary pump guns. Having no significant movement of heavy mechanical parts during the discharge cycle, PCP airgun designs produce lower recoil, and can shoot as many as 100 shots per charge depending on the tank/reservoir size. The ready supply of air has allowed the development of both semi-automatic and fully automatic air guns. PCP guns are very popular in Europe because of their accuracy and ease of use. They are widely utilized in ISSF 10 meter air pistol and rifle shooting events and the sport of Field Target shooting, and are usually fitted with telescopic sights.

Early stand pump designs encountered problems of fatigue (both human and mechanical), temperature warping, and condensation – none of which are beneficial to accurate shooting or the airguns' longevity. Modern stand pumps have multi-stage chambers and built-in air filtration systems and have overcome many of these problems. Using scuba-quality air decanted from a diving cylinder provides consistently clean, dry, high-pressure air.

During the typical PCP's discharge cycle, the hammer of the rifle is released by the sear to strike the bash valve. The hammer may move rearwards or forwards, unlike firearms where the hammer almost always moves forward. The valve is held closed by a spring and the pressure of the air in the reservoir. The pressure of the spring is constant, and the pressure of the air released (which is also known as the working pressure) decreases with each successive shot. As a result, when the reservoir pressure is high, the valve opens less fully and closes faster than when the reservoir pressure is lower, resulting in a similar total volume of air flowing past the valve with each shot. This results in a degree of partial self-regulation that gives a greater consistency of velocity from shot to shot, which corresponds to the middle "plateau" phase of the gun's shot-to-shot muzzle velocity profile (also known as the power curve ). Well-designed PCP will display good shot-to-shot consistency over a long period, as the air reservoir is being depleted.

Other PCP rifles and pistols are regulated, i.e. the firing valve operates within a secondary chamber separated from the main air reservoir by the regulator body. The regulator maintains the pressure within this secondary chamber at a set pressure (lower than the main reservoir's) until the main reservoir's pressure drops to the point where it can no longer do so. As a result, shot-to-shot consistency is maintained for longer than in an unregulated rifle, and the gun can also output more shots due to reduced waste of reservoir pressure.

=== Compressed gas ===
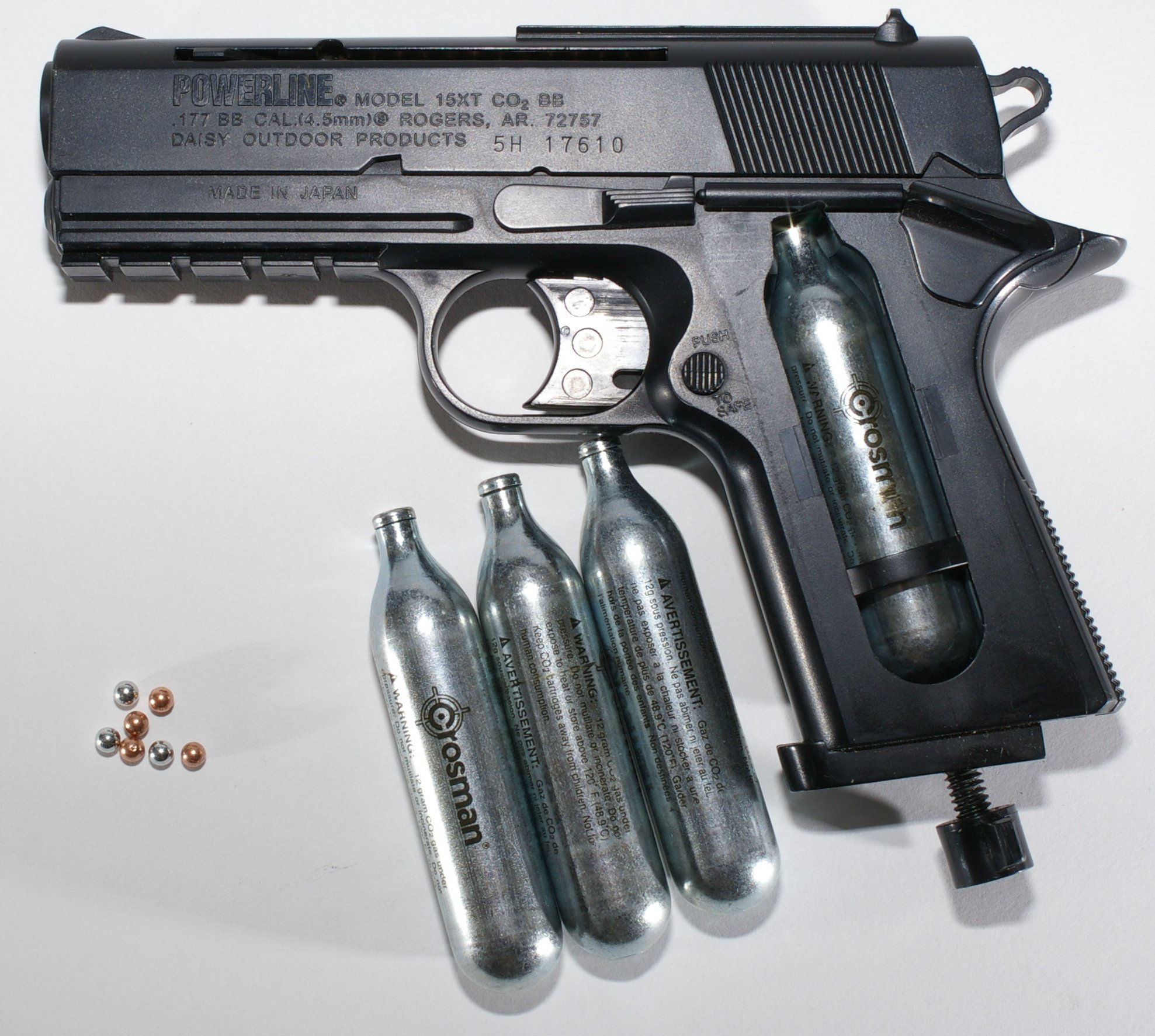
CO_{2} pistol and disposable Powerlet cylinders

A Pure Energy N_{2} tank with a remote line attached

Compressed gas guns, also known as CG guns, are essentially pneumatic airguns utilizing detachable pressure reservoirs in the form of prefilled external gas cylinders (often with built-in regulator valves), and are commonly referred to as CO_{2} guns due to the ubiquitous commercial use of bottled liquid carbon dioxide. However, more recent high-end models sometimes use larger compressed air/nitrogen (known as HPA or "N_{2}") cylinders, which have higher operating pressures and better thermal stability.

==== CO_{2} ====
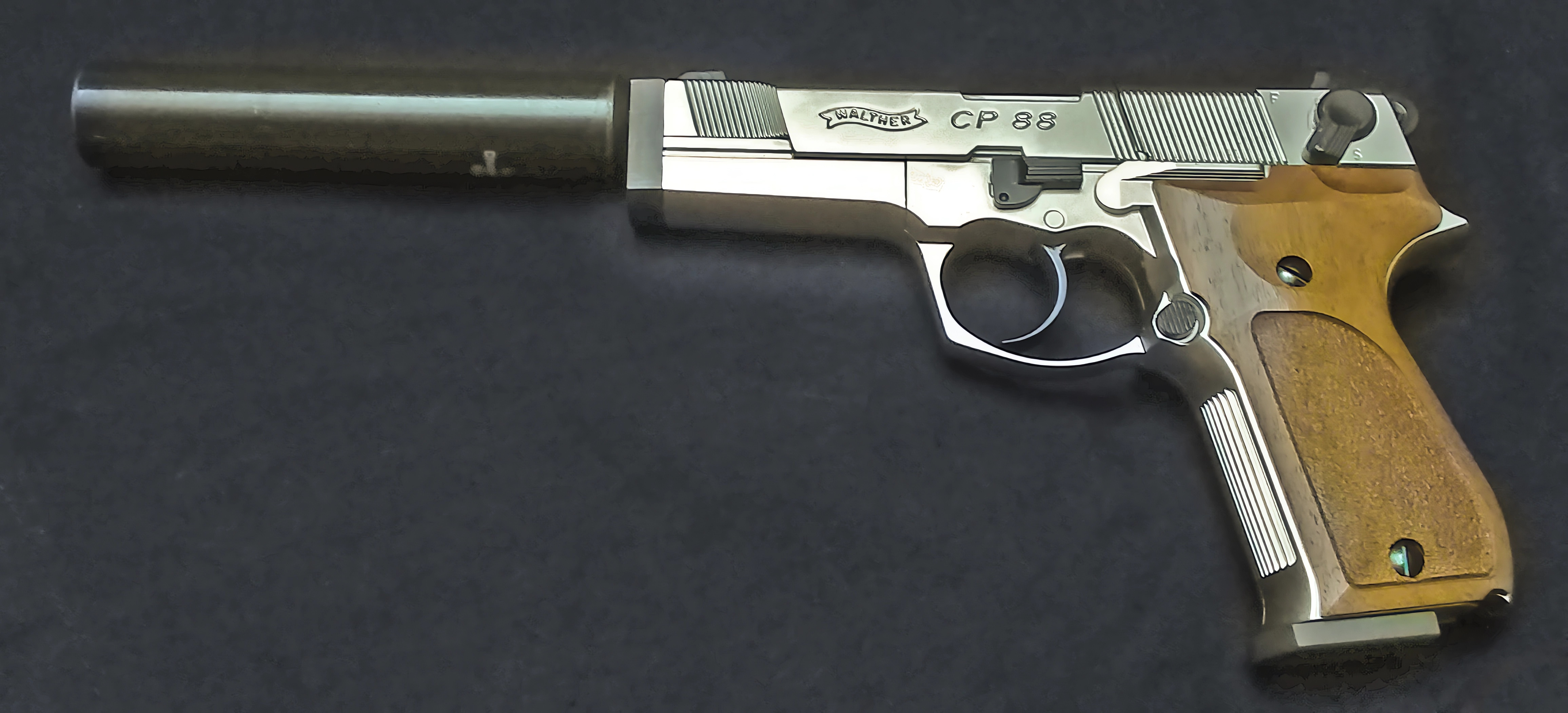
Walther CP 88 CO_{2} pistol with adapted silencer

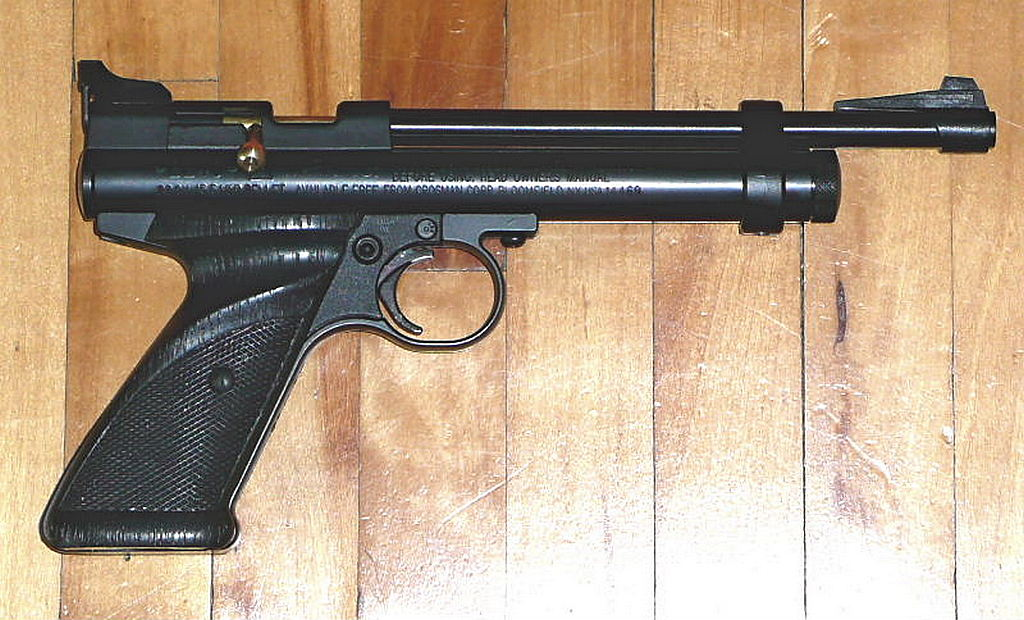
Crosman 2240 CO_{2} one shot pistol, (.22 pellet caliber)

CO_{2} guns, like other pneumatic guns using compressed air, offer power for repeated shots in a compact package without the need for complex pumping or filling mechanisms. The ability to store power for repeated shots also means that repeating arms are possible. There are many replica revolvers and semi-automatic pistols on the market that use CO_{2} power. Most CO_{2} guns use a disposable cylinder called a "Powerlet" cartridge, that is often purchased with 12 grams (0.42 oz) of pressurized CO_{2} gas, although some, usually more expensive models, use larger refillable CO_{2} reservoirs like those typically used with paintball markers.

CO_{2} guns are popular for training, as the guns and ammunition are inexpensive, relatively safe to use, and no specialized facilities are needed for safety. In addition, they can be purchased and owned in areas where firearms possession is either strictly controlled or banned outright. Most CO_{2} powered guns are relatively inexpensive, and there are a few precision target guns available that use CO_{2}.

==== High-pressure air ====
The high-pressure air (HPA) system, or N_{2}, was originally developed for paintball markers as a replacement for CO_{2} cartridges, and uses powerlet interface-compatible diving cylinders filled with either pure nitrogen or compressed air (which is 78% nitrogen). Because nitrogen is more inert than CO_{2}, it remains in the gaseous state longer when compressed; when it expands, it cools due to the Joule-Thomson effect, but at a far lower rate than liquid CO_{2} because there is no change in state from liquid to gas. This thermostability reduces the variation in output pressure associated with rapid successions of firing cycles, improving accuracy and reliability in extreme climates. However, because compressed air is stored at higher pressures (up to 34 MPa or 4,900 psi) than liquid CO_{2} (stored at around 8 MPa or 1,200 psi), HPA cylinders are more expensive. Cylinders smaller than 1.1 L (67 cu in) may not even last as long as a standard CO_{2} cartridge when subjected to frequent use.

It is also possible to power an HPA-compatible gun directly from a plug-in air compressor without using a gas cylinder, though this type of setup is rare.

==== Air cartridge system ====
First developed in the United Kingdom during the 1980s as the Saxby-Palmer Ensign, and then by Brocock as the "Brocock Air Cartridge System" (BACS) and later into the "Tandem Air Cartridge" (TAC), this variation of the pre-charged pneumatic design has no pressure reservoir built into the gun, but instead use removable and reusable metallic gas cylinders often known as "Brocock cartridges" after its British manufacturer. Each air cartridge is essentially a self-contained gas reservoir housed inside a cartridge case (usually in the size of a .38 Special), with an internal bash valve designed to release the content when the base of the cartridge is struck. Prior to shooting, each cartridge is pre-filled with sufficient compressed air for one shot (typically via a multi-stroke hand pump) and has a .177/.22 caliber pellet pre-seated to its front slot, and the entire cartridge is then inserted into a chamber in the gun barrel. When shooting, the hammer hits the rear of the air cartridge, mimicking the function of a centerfire ammunition. This allows the airgun to be constructed and operated in similar fashions to genuine firearms. It also allows for higher shot consistency because each cartridge can be easily filled to an identical air charge, essentially removing the "power curve" of conventional PCP guns and bypassing any need for regulators. It also simplifies the magazine feed design and eliminates the risk of deforming the projectiles when the action seats each pellet, as the soft lead pellet is protected from contact with the action probe by the harder cartridge casing.

The air cartridge system, both in the rifle and revolver forms, was at the peak of its popularity throughout the 1990s. The popularity of the Brocock range was such that, by 2002, estimates put the number of air cartridge guns in circulation around 70,000–80,000. However, a small number of incidents relating to the alleged illegal conversion of (mainly) Brococks to allow them to discharge live ammunition sparked a media frenzy. In early 2002, the BBC reported that figures from the National Criminal Intelligence Service showed converted Brococks accounted for 35 per cent of all guns recovered by the police, and David McCrone, firearms adviser to the Association of Chief Police Officers and Deputy Chief Constable of Greater Manchester Police, told the BBC's Newsnight "there is evidence which would justify banning them". After the UK government implemented the Anti-social Behaviour Act 2003 in January 2004, it became illegal to possess such airguns without a firearm certificate in the United Kingdom. Brocock subsequently ceased production of all air cartridge systems and turned to focus primarily on PCP airguns.

== Ammunition ==
=== Pellet ===
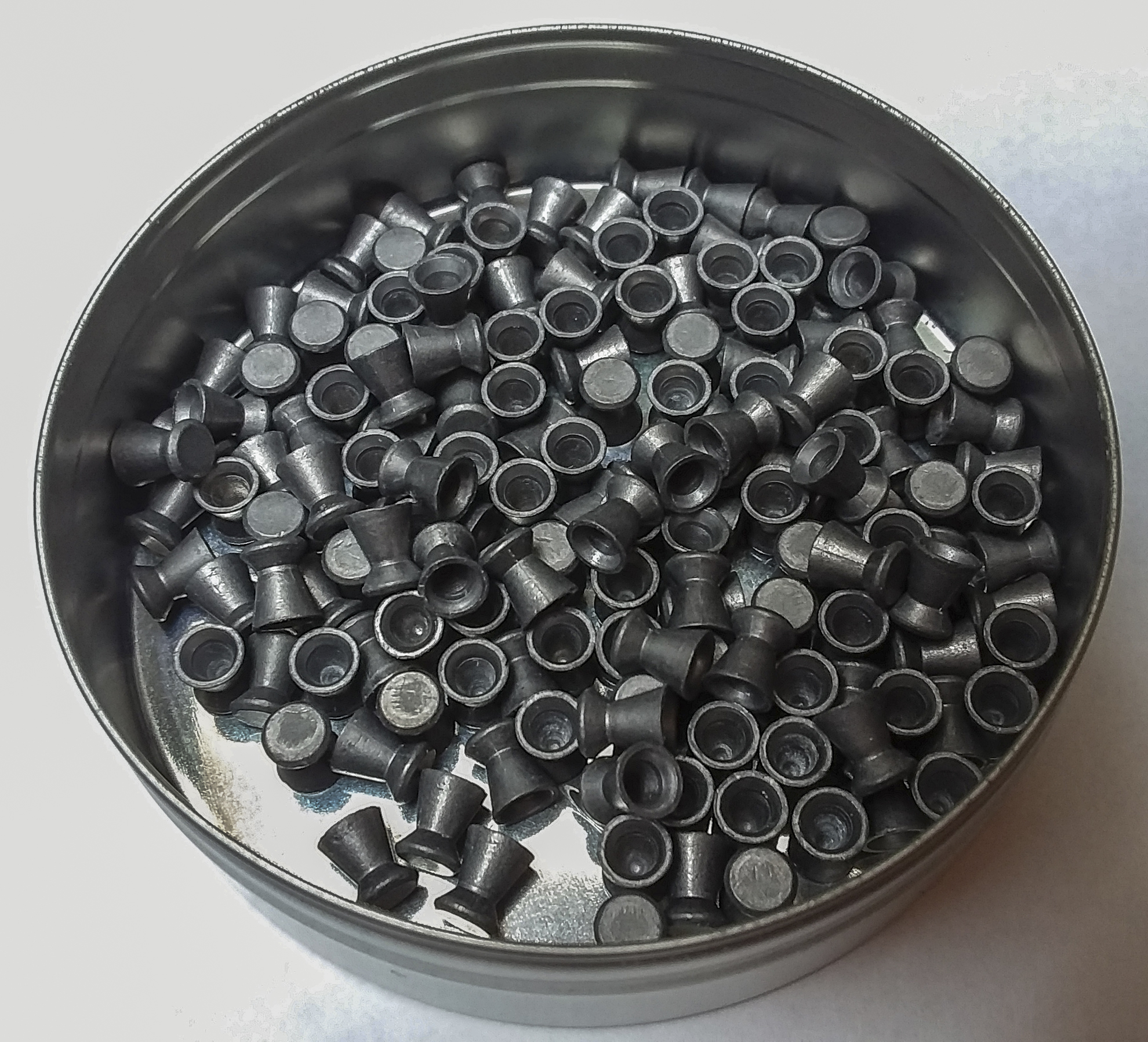
Wadcutter or Flathead pellets

The most popular ammunition used in rifled air guns is made of lead, a heavy metal. Lead is highly poisonous (whether inhaled or swallowed), affecting almost every organ and system in the human body. For this reason, lead-free pellets are becoming increasingly popular, and are available in all major shapes and styles, just like traditional lead pellets.

By far the most popular shape is the wasp-waisted diabolo pellet, which has two sections – a solid front portion called the "head", which contains the center of mass and is available in a variety of shapes and styles such as flat (wadcutter), round (domed), cone-shaped (pointed) and pitted (hollow point); and a hollowed, thin-walled conical rear portion called the "skirt", which expands and fully engages the bore to provide a good seal and thus allows maximal efficiency in pellet propulsion during shooting. In flight, the skirt has greater drag-to-weight ratio than the head and exerts a rearward pull behind the center of mass, similar to that of a shuttlecock. This produces a phenomenon known as drag stabilization, which helps to counteract yawing and maintain a consistent flight path. However, the diabolo shape also means that the overall pellet will have poor ballistic coefficient and tends to lose energy quickly and be more unstable especially in the transonic region (272–408 m/s ~ 893–1340 ft/s).

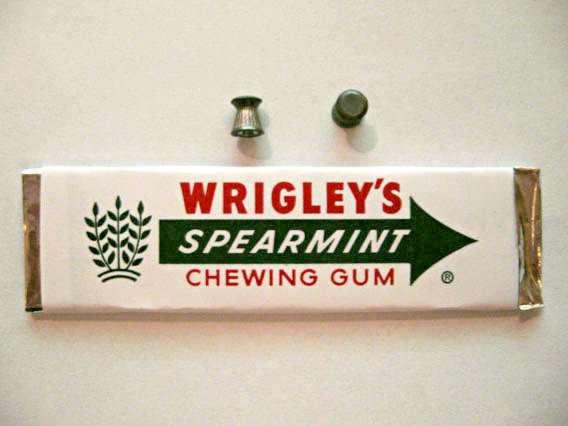
A .177 (4.5mm) caliber "Wadcutter" pellet next to a stick of chewing gum

Diabolo pellets are conventionally made from lead, but are widely available in non-lead alternatives, such as tin, or a combination of materials such as steel or gold alloys with polymer tips. A variety of lead-free pellets are offered by all major pellet manufacturers, including H&N Sport, RWS, JSB, Gamo, and others. Since lead is very dense, it has a higher ballistic coefficient than lightweight alternatives such as tin, copper, or plastic. At the present time, the airgun industry does not mass-produce dense alternatives to lead with a high ballistic coefficient for long-range shooting.

==== Slug ====
Some manufacturers also have recently introduced the more cylindro-conoidal-shaped "slug" pellets for the more powerful modern PCP air rifles. Compared to the commonly used diabolo pellets, these slug pellets resemble cast bullets and have more contact surface with the bore and hence need greater propelling force to overcome friction, but have better aerodynamics, ballistic coefficient, and longer effective ranges due to the more aerodynamic shape, however they also require a fully rifled barrel for spin stabilization in flight. Appropriately sized bullets cast from firearm bullet molds can be used in big bore air rifles. Caution should be used when handling lead projectiles or preparing animals for food, as lead fragments can be easily missed inside the meat. Lead-free slugs in airgun calibers are gradually being developed and becoming available for purchase from manufacturers such as Zan Projectiles, due in part to regulations on hunting with lead projectiles in many areas.

=== BB ===
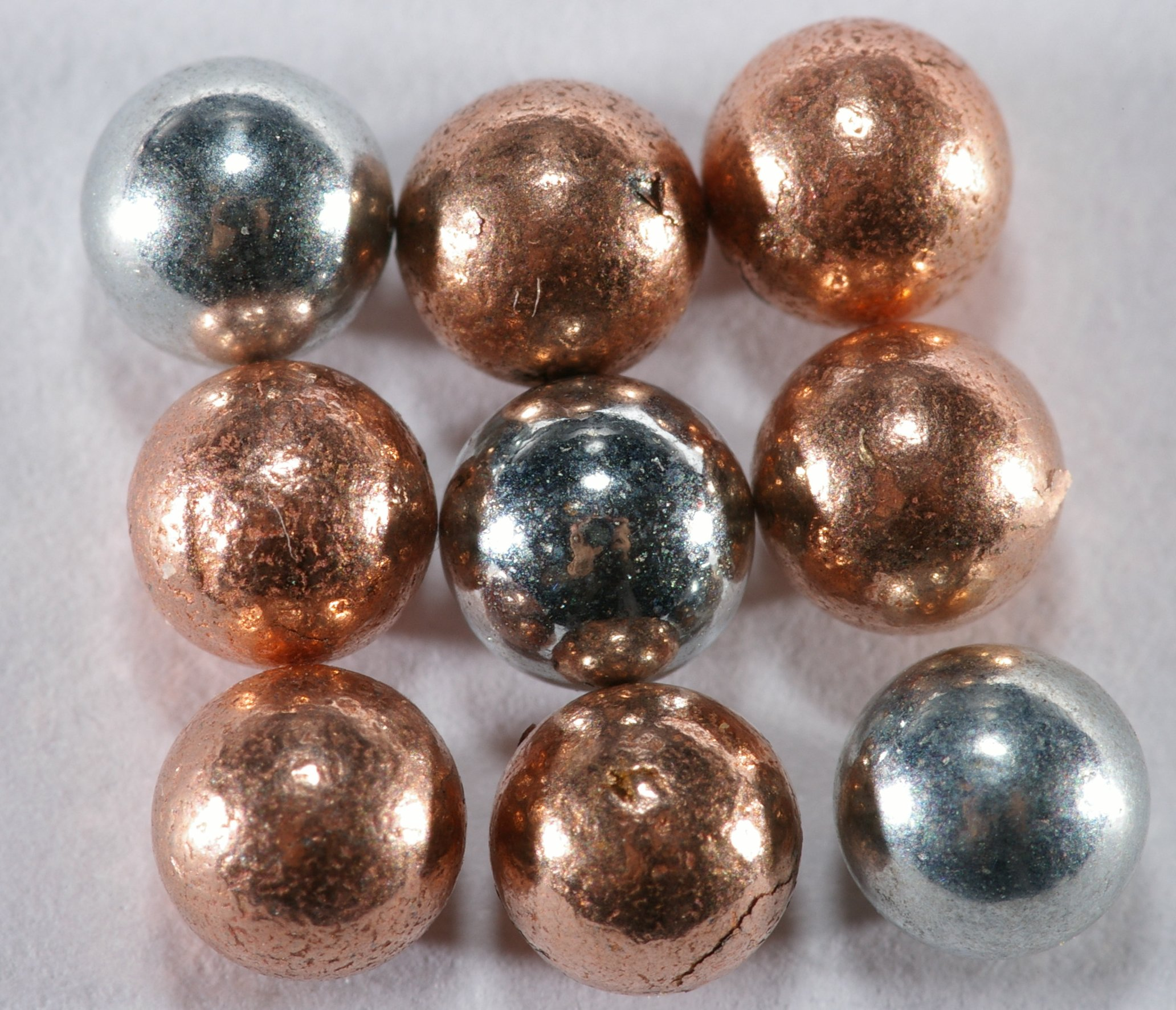
Steel BBs coated with copper and nickel

The BB shot was once the most common airgun ammunition in the US, thanks to the popularity of Daisy's line of BB airguns. A BB is a small metallic ball in 4.5 mm/.177" diameter, typically made of steel (with a copper or zinc coating) or lead. Originally called the "round shot", the contemporary name came from the "BB"- size lead birdshot used in shotgun shells, which the first BB gun invented in 1886 was designed to shoot. Steel BBs can be acceptably accurate at short distances when fired from properly designed BB guns with smoothbore barrels. Lead #3 buckshot pellets can be used in .25" caliber airguns as if they were large BBs.

Due to the hardness of the steel, steel BBs cannot "take" to rifled barrels, which is why they are undersized (4.4 mm ball against 4.5 mm bore) to allow them to be used in .177" rifled barrels, which when used in this configuration can in effect be considered smoothbore, but with a poorer gas-seal, and if 4.5 mm diameter BBs are used, they would jam in the bore. Therefore, steel BBs lack the spin stabilization required for long-range accuracy, and usage in any but the cheapest rifled guns is discouraged. The softer lead BBs, however, can be used in rifled barrels.

Typically BBs are used for indoor practice, casual outdoor plinking, training children, or to save money, as they are significantly cheaper than pellets. Replica CO_{2} pistols allow people to train with a BB gun, saving a lot of money to centerfire firearm cartridges. Care should be exercised to avoid ricochet, and safety glasses are recommended. Recently, manufacturers have created frangible BBs, which break apart and do not ricochet, reducing the hazards associated with BB guns.

Some shotgunners use sightless BB rifles to train in instinctive shooting. Similar guns were also used briefly by the United States Army in a Vietnam-era instinctive shooting program called "Quick Kill".

=== Darts and arrows ===
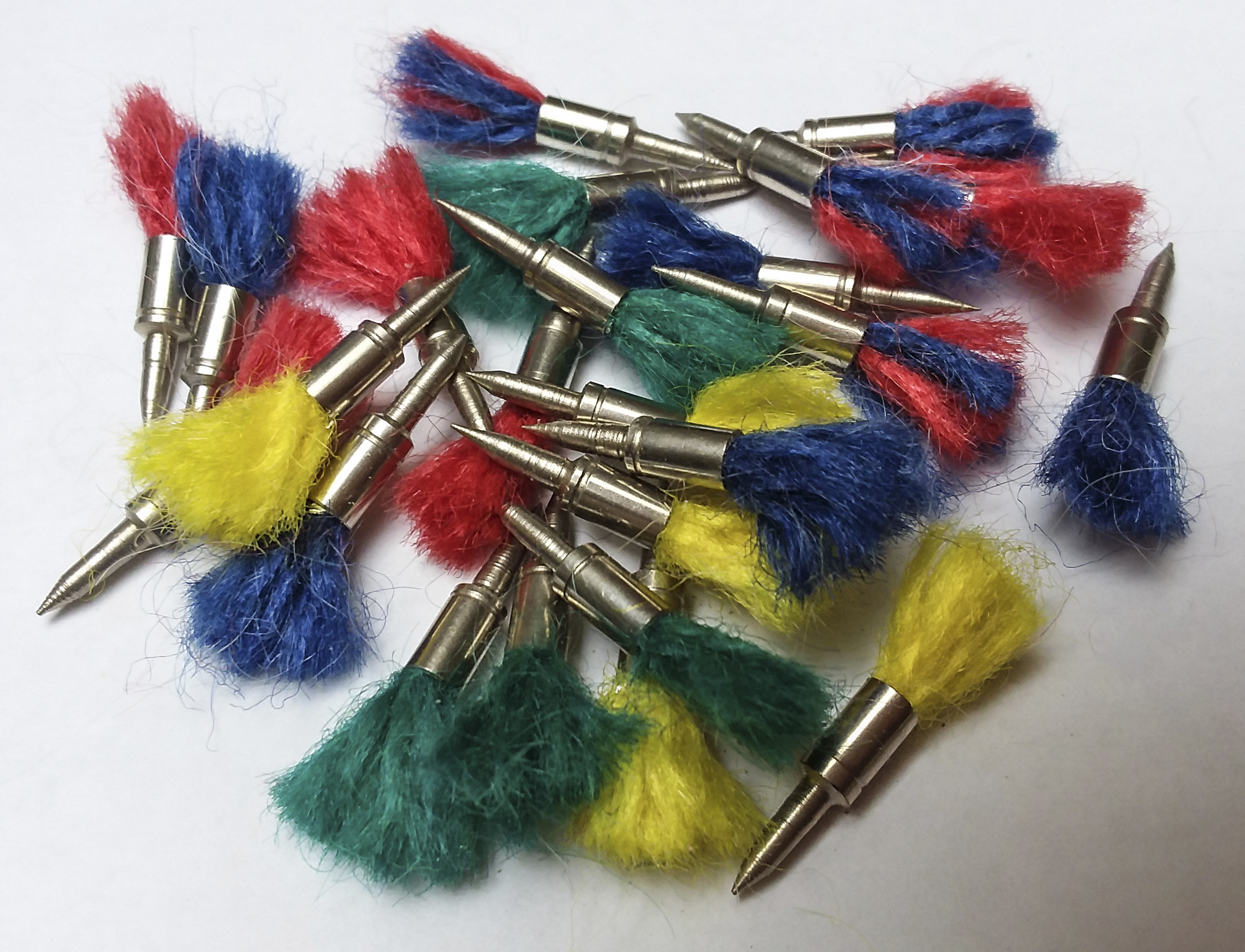
Darts for an air gun

In the 18th and 19th centuries, air gun darts were popular, largely because they could be reused. Although less popular now, several different types of darts are made to be used in air guns, but it is not recommended that darts be used in air guns with rifled bores or in spring-powered air guns. Air guns that shoot darts are sometimes called dart guns, and tranquilizer guns if the darts used are loaded with anesthetic (tranquilizer) compounds.

Some modern air guns are designed to discharge arrows and are called arrow guns or sometimes airbows. These arrows are designed with a hollow shaft that is open in the rear where the nock would normally be. When loaded, the hollow arrow shaft is slid rearwards over a barrel whose external diameter is only fractionally smaller than the shaft's interior diameter, providing a close-enough fitting that minimizes rattling and gives a reasonable enveloping seal without causing too much friction. During shooting, the trigger releases high-pressure air from the barrel to the front portion of the hollow arrow shaft, pushing the arrow forward. Such air guns can shoot arrows at launch velocities rivaling or even exceeding high-end crossbows, while retaining consistency of precision unaffected by archer's paradox, but they are also more expensive to set up and maintain.

=== Laser beam ===
The modern pentathlon has since 2009 included a laser-run event that replaced the traditional cross country run of 3,200 meters and timed air-pistol shoot. The competitors run 4 laps of 800 m combined with 4 rounds of firing. The pistols used are modified air pistols that fire an eye-safe laser beam towards a target at the same time as a discharge of air. This has made the organization of the events easier from a safety point of view and allows competitors to travel more easily with their weapons.

=== Airsoft pellets ===
Airsoft pellets are plastic BB shaped ammunition shot from airsoft guns.

== Calibers ==
The most common air gun calibers are

- .177 (4.5 mm): the most common caliber. Mandated by the ISSF for use in international target shooting competition at 10m, up to Olympic level in both rifle and pistol events. It has also been adopted by most National Governing Bodies for domestic use in similar target shooting events. It has the flattest trajectory of all the calibers for a given energy level. At suitable energy levels it can be used effectively for hunting.
- .22 (5.5 mm & 5.6 mm): for hunting and general use. In recent years air rifles and pistols in .22" (and some other calibers) have been allowed for use in both domestic and international target shooting in events not controlled by the ISSF. Most notably in FT/HFT and Smallbore Benchrest competitions. These events often allow the use of any caliber air gun, up to a maximum which is often .22", rather than a fixed caliber.

Other less common traditional calibers include:

- .20 (5 mm): initially proprietary to the Sheridan multi-pump pneumatic air rifle, later more widely used.
- .25 (6.35 mm): the largest commonly available caliber for most of the 20th century.
- .30 (7.62 mm): the current largest available for non-PCP powered airguns

Larger caliber air rifles suitable for hunting large animals are offered by major manufacturers. These are usually PCP guns. The major calibers available are:

- .357 (9mm)
- .45 (11.43 mm)
- .50 (12.7 mm)
- .58 (14.5 mm)
- .72 (18.28 mm)

Custom air guns are available in even larger calibers such as 20 mm (0.79") or .87 (22.1 mm).

== Legislation ==
While in some countries air guns are not subject to any specific regulation, in most, there are laws which differ widely. Each jurisdiction has its definition of an air gun. Regulations may vary for weapons of different bore, muzzle energy, velocity, or ammunition material. Guns designed to fire metal pellets are often more tightly controlled than airsoft weapons. There may be a minimum age for possession, and sales of both air guns and ammunition may be restricted. Some areas require permits and background checks similar to those required for propellant type firearms.

== Safety and misuse ==
While historical air guns have been made specifically for warfare, modern air guns can also be deadly. In medical literature, modern air guns have been noted as a cause of death. This has been the case for guns of caliber .177 and .22 that are within the legal muzzle energy of air guns in the United Kingdom.

For reason of safety and security a rule of use of the safety flag has been strictly mentioned by ISSF for the 10m air pistol and rifle shooting sports events.

== See also ==
- Blowgun
- Marksmanship
- Airsoft
- Paintball
