= Shitaya =

Neighborhood in Taitō-ku, Tokyo, Japan

Shitaya (下谷) is the name of a neighborhood in Taito, Tokyo, and a former ward (下谷区 Shitaya-ku) in the now-defunct Tokyo City. The former ward encompassed 15 neighborhoods in the western half of the modern Taito ward, including Ueno, Yanaka and Akihabara.

The area currently referred to as Shitaya is a long, narrow strip stretching from northeast of Ueno Park to south of Minowa Station.

== History ==
In 1947, when the city was transformed into a metropolis, the Shitaya ward was merged with Asakusa to form the modern Taito ward.

== Transport ==
Iriya Station of the Tokyo Metro Hibiya Line is on the border of Shitaya and Iriya neighborhoods.

== Education ==
Taito City Board of Education operates public elementary and junior high schools.

Shitaya 1-chome and portions of 2-chome are zoned to Taishō Elementary School (大正小学校). Shitaya 3-chome and parts of 2-chome are zoned to Kanasogi Elementary School (金曽木小学校).

Shitaya 1-chome and portions of 2-chome are zoned to Shinobugaoka Junior High School (忍岡中学校). Shitaya 3-chome and portions of 2-chome are zoned to Hakuyō Junior High School (柏葉中学校).

== Notable people ==
- Kimura Ihei
- Takayama Torakichi
