= Girardoni air rifle =

18th-century Austrian air rifle

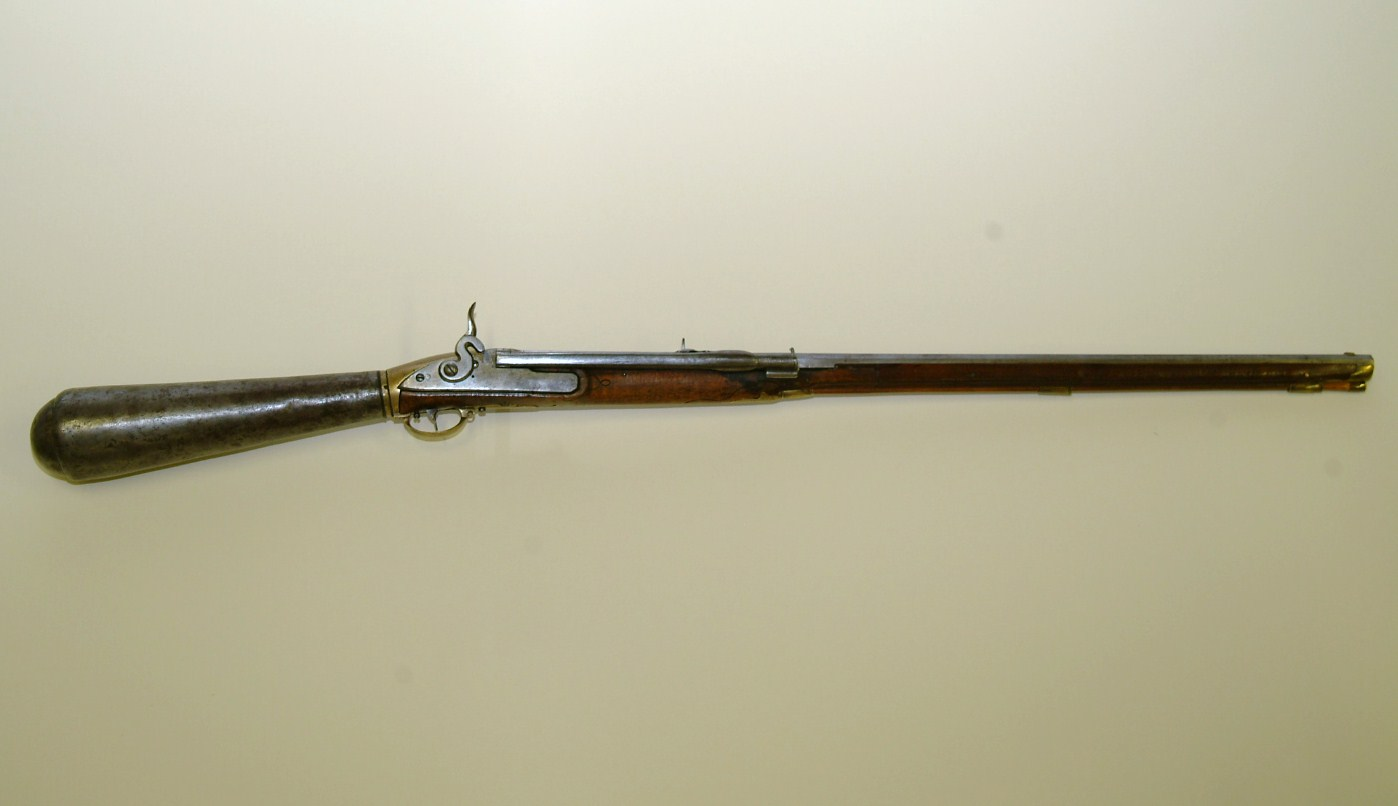
- Girardoni system Austrian repeating air rifle, circa 1795, believed to have been taken on the Lewis and Clark Expedition
- Type: Air rifle
- Place of origin: Holy Roman Empire

Service history
- In service: 1780–1816
- Used by: Austrian Empire; United States
- Wars: Austro-Turkish War (1788–1791); Coalition Wars; Lewis and Clark Expedition; Napoleonic Wars

Production history
- Designer: Bartolomeo Girardoni
- Designed: 1779 or 1780
- No. built: 1,300

Specifications
- Mass: 4.5 kg (9.9 lb)
- Length: 120 cm (3.9 ft)
- Cartridge: spherical balls
- Caliber: .46", 11.7 mm 146.3 grains (9.48 g), or .51", 13 mm, 201.49 grains (13.06 g)
- Action: Pre-charged pneumatic: Pressurized air ~800 psi (5515.8 kpa)
- Muzzle velocity: about 690 fps (152 m/s), 117 ft lbs (159 J)
- Feed system: 20/22 shot tubular magazine
- Sights: Iron

The Girardoni air rifle is one of the first repeating rifles, designed by Ladin artisan watchmaker and gunsmith Bartolomeo Girardoni in Austria circa 1779. Girardoni made both customary flintlocks and the innovative air guns, called Windbüchse ("wind rifle" in German).

One of the air rifle's more famous associations is its use on the Lewis and Clark Expedition to explore and map the Louisiana Purchase of 1803.

== Biography ==
Bartolomeo Girardoni was born 30 May 1744 in Cortina d'Ampezzo, a town populated by Ladins and part of the County of Tyrol and Austria until after World War I.

In early 1779, Austrian Field Marshal Franz Moritz von Lacy became aware of Girardoni's repeating rifle and wrote a positive report to Joseph II, Holy Roman Emperor. After some tests, Lacy proposed that he should make 1,000 flintlock rifles and 500 air guns, to be delivered to Wenzel Joseph von Colloredo. In December 1779, accompanied by his family, his assistant Franz Colli and two workers, Girardoni moved to Penzing near Vienna. Having lost his left hand in a gun accident, he made himself an iron hand prosthesis. In his spare time, he continued to make individual pocket watches, while for rifle production, he had to organize some sort of mass production.

Until 1784, 111 flintlocks and 274 air guns were made, and the army was not satisfied with the output. Relieved of flintlock duties, he focused on air rifles and the necessary additional equipment, with each worker making specific parts that were assembled by him. Apart from the rifle itself, air reservoirs, air pumps, sealings, valves, and other non-standard components parts had to be made, precise enough to be interchangeable.

After Frederick the Great had died, Catherine the Great and the Ottoman Empire in 1787 started another war regarding control of Crimea, which triggered a war between Austria and Turkey, from 1788 until 1791. At that time, some 1,000 air guns had been made, but only 200 complete sets were delivered to the depot at Petrovaradin Fortress, and 500 in April 1788. Girardoni died in Vienna on 21 March 1799.

== History and use ==
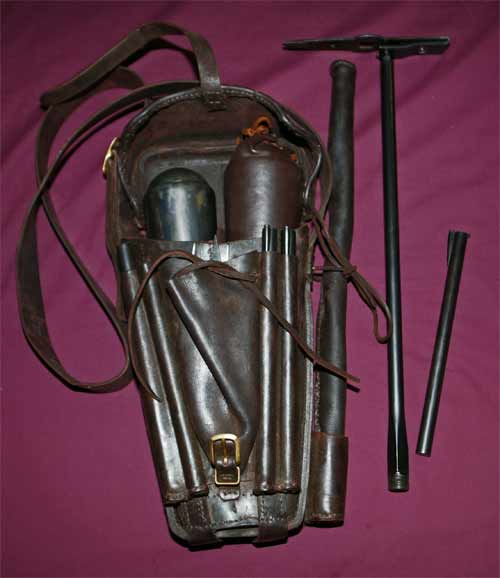
Recreation of an Austrian Girardoni system accoutrements bag, including bullet mold, air pump, spare air flasks, wrenches, and ladle

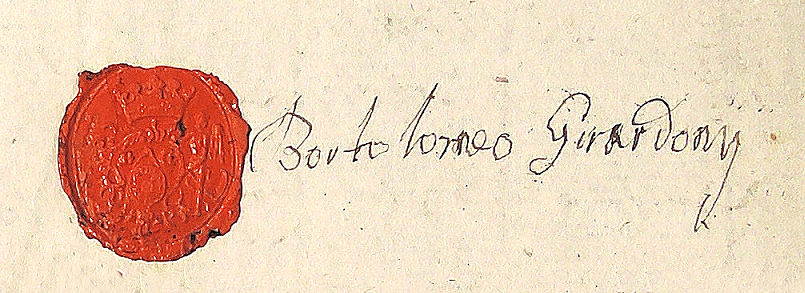
Signature Bartolomeo Girardony, 1799

Around 1803, one of the Girardoni rifles wound up in Philadelphia, where an aide to President Thomas Jefferson, Captain Meriwether Lewis acquired the piece. Lewis stated in his journals that he purchased the air gun, but not when or where he did so. Lewis took the gun with him on the Lewis and Clark Expedition (1803-1806), and used it in demonstrations that they performed for nearly every Native American tribe they encountered on the expedition. Some scholars have argued that the airgun carried by Merriwether Lewis was not a Girardoni, but a Lukens, made by Isaiah Lukens of Philadelphia. However, Colonel Thomas Rodney wrote the following on 8 September 1803: "Visited Captain [Lewis's] barge. He [showed] us his air gun which fired 22 times at one charge." All Lukens's known air guns were single-shot muzzleloaders, not repeaters, making it very likely that Lewis's gun was a Girardoni, the only repeating airgun of the time. Lewis fired the air gun on at least 16 occasions to demonstrate it to various Native American tribes. On 24 January 1806, Lewis wrote "My air gun also astonishes them very much, they cannot comprehend its shooting so often and without powder; and think that it is great medicine."

== Design and capabilities ==
The Girardoni air rifle was four feet (1.2 m) long and weighed ten pounds (4.5 kg), about the same size and weight as infantry muskets of the time. It fired a .46 or .51 caliber ball and had a tubular, gravity or spring-fed magazine with a capacity of 20-22 balls. Unlike its contemporary, muzzle-loading muskets, which required the rifleman to stand up to reload with powder and ball, the Girardoni air rifle permitted the shooter to load a ball by pushing the transverse spring-loaded chamber bar out of the breech which allowed a ball to be supplied to it from the magazine and which then rebounded back to its firing position, all while lying down.

The detachable air reservoir was in the club-shaped stock. With a full air reservoir, the Girardoni air rifle had the capacity to shoot 30 shots at useful pressure. These balls were effective to approximately 125 yd (114 m) on a full air reservoir. The power declined as the air reservoir was emptied. To recharge the air reservoir, it was attached to the top of the accessory pump, the base of which was placed on the ground and secured with the feet, which then required some 1,500 strokes to bring it up to its working pressure of approximately 800 psi (55 bar).

Contemporary regulations of 1788 required that each rifleman be equipped with the rifle, three compressed air reservoirs (two spare and one attached to the rifle), cleaning stick, hand pump, lead ladle, and 100 lead balls, 1 in the chamber, 19 in the magazine built into the rifle, and the remaining 80 in four tin tubes, (or speed loaders in the modern vernacular). Equipment not carried attached to the rifle was held in a special leather knapsack. It was also necessary to keep the leather gaskets of the reservoir moist to maintain a good seal and prevent leakage.

The advantages of the weapon compared to other guns of the time were that on a full charge it had a high rate of fire, low recoil, no smoke, less noise than a musket, and needed less cleaning. It could be loaded while lying flat, while muskets typically had to be reloaded standing up. The disadvantages were that the mechanism was fragile and complex, and could easily become non-functional given the rigors of troops in the field. Charging the air cylinder required 1,500 strokes of a hand pump, similar to a modern bicycle pump, which was time-consuming, and left the shooter helpless for the many minutes it took to recharge. If the pump was lost or damaged the gun became useless. The air gun was useful as a specialty weapon, but not as a practical everyday soldier's tool.

== See also ==
- Kunitomo air gun
- Weaponry of the Austro-Hungarian Empire
