= Kunitomo air gun =

Kunitomo air rifle
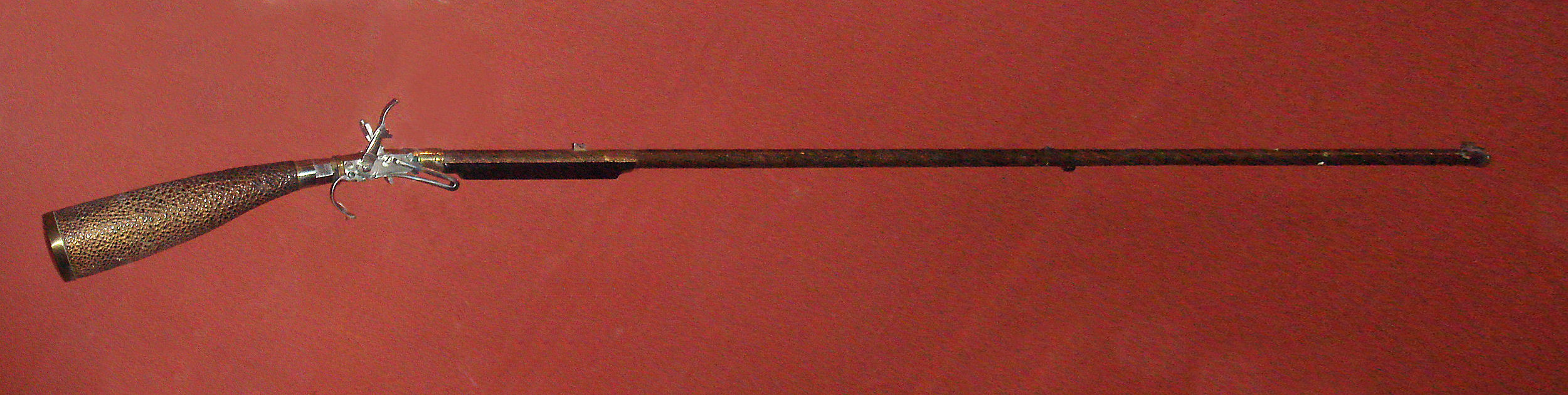
- Type: Air rifle
- Place of origin: Japan

Production history
- Designer: Kunitomo Ikkansai
- Designed: 1820–1830

Specifications
- Barrels: 1
- Sights: Iron

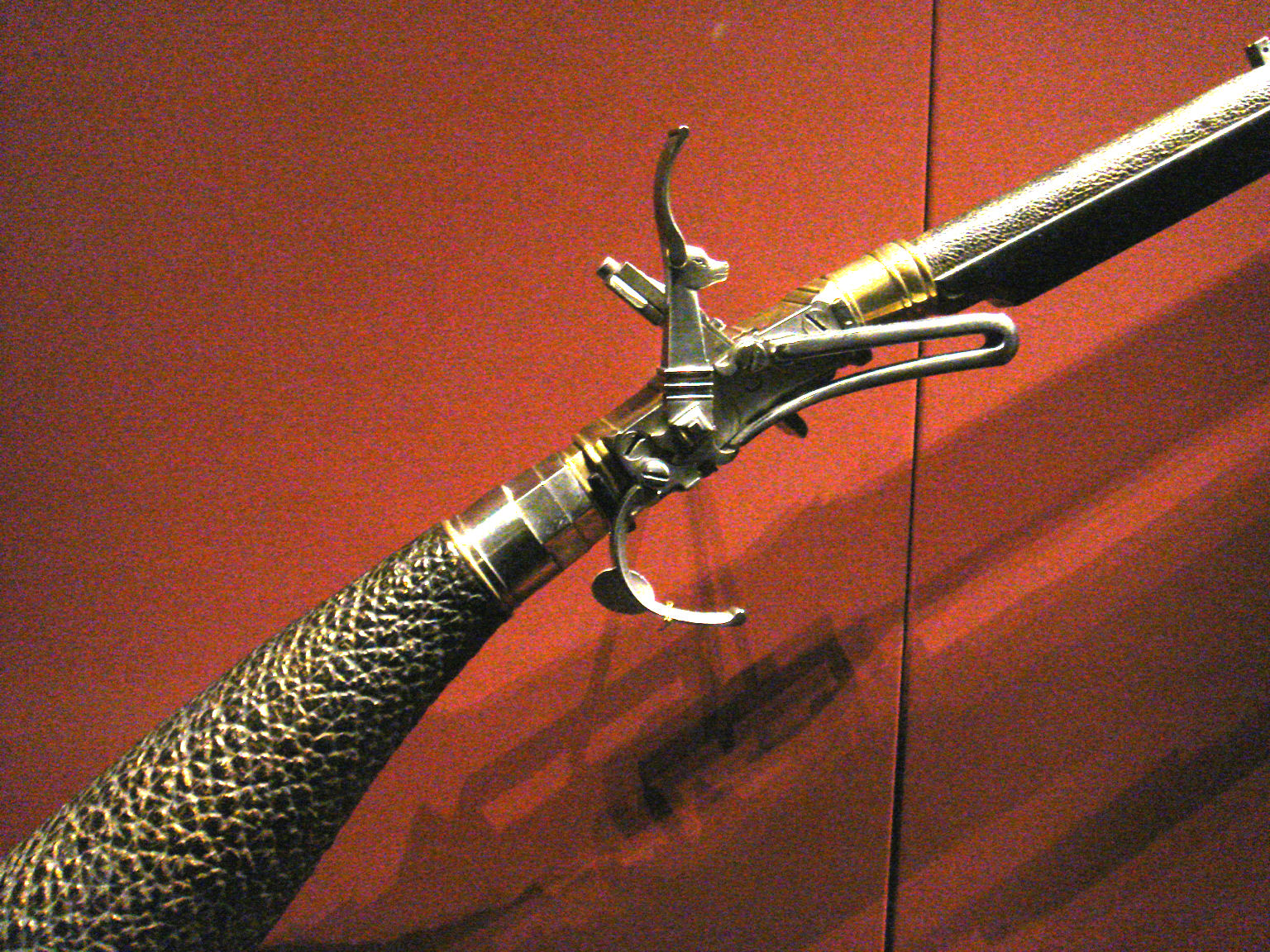
Kunitomo air gun's trigger mechanism.

The Kunitomo air gun was an air rifle circa 1820, by the Japanese inventor Kunitomo Ikkansai who developed various manufacturing methods for guns and also created an air gun based on the study of Western knowledge ("rangaku") acquired from the Dutch in Dejima. Kunitomo's invention of a new type of air gun in 1819 is well known in the history of Japanese technology.

== See also ==
- Girardoni M1780 repeating air rifle
- List of air guns
