= Aoyama Kagemichi =

Japanese samurai (1819-1891)

- 青山 景通

Personal details
- Born: 1819 Nakatsugawa, Naegi Domain, Tokugawa Japan
- Died: December 11, 1891 (aged 71–72) Empire of Japan

Aoyama Kagemichi (青山 景通; 1819-1891) was a Japanese samurai, student of Hirata kokugaku, and low-ranking retainer of the Naegi Domain. He also used the name Inakichi (稲吉). His eldest and third sons were Aoyama Naomichi (青山直通) and Aoyama Tanemichi respectively.

== Biography ==
In 1852, Aoyama enrolled in the Ibukinoya academy founded by Hirata Atsutane. At the time, the Ibukinoya was led by Atsutane's adopted heir Hirata Kanetane.

Because his superior Tōyama Tomoyoshi was both a sōshaban and wakadoshiyori, Aoyama was able to stay informed on political developments of the time. One such event was the attempted assassination of Andō Nobumasa.

During his studies under Kanetane, Aoyama inducted a number of other students into the Ibukinoya, particularly from the region surrounding his native Nakatsugawa.

The kokugaku scholar Suzuki Shigetane was excommunicated by Kanetane for heresy after having sought to find precedents for removing unworthy Emperors from the throne. Suzuki was later murdered at his home in 1863. The assassin was allegedly Aoyama, although it is unclear if Kanetane himself had any involvement. Itō Masura (伊藤 益荒) and Umemura Shin'ichirō (梅村 真一郎) were also suspects in the killing.

Aoyama and his son Naomichi assisted the new government's fledgling bureaucracy during the Boshin War. During that time, Aoyama was assigned to a post in the Department of Divinities. As part of the Hirata school's nativist program, they spearheaded a violent campaign of anti-Buddhist persecution. This saw the demolition of the Unrin-ji, the Naegi domainal bodaiji, as well as the destruction of numerous other Buddhist facilities. Shocked by this as well as the accompanying purge of Confucian education, a number of Confucian karō of Naegi planned a revolt. The conspirators included the local leaders Chiba Gon'emon (千葉 権右衛門), Chiba Takeo (千葉 武男), Chiba Ryōgorō (千葉 鐐五郎), Higashi Yūnoshin (東 侑之進), and Kamiyama Kennoshin (神山 健之進). Aoyama detected the conspiracy, however, and orchestrated the arrests of those involved on January 12, 1870. On May 6 of the same year, Aoyama was joined by fellow scholars Ogiwara Itsuo and Miwada Mototsuna for a festival honoring the spirits of the Four Great Men of Kokugaku.

In 1876, the Aoyama house was destroyed by an arson attack. Aoyama himself died in 1891.
