= Toyama =

Toyama may refer to:

== Places ==
- Toyama Prefecture, a prefecture of Japan located in the Hokuriku region on the main Honshu island
- Toyama (city), the capital city of Toyama Prefecture
- Toyama Station, the main station of Toyama, Toyama
- Toyama Bay, a bay in Japan
- Toyama, Shinjuku, a district in Shinjuku ward in Tokyo, Japan
- Toyama Domain, a feudal domain in Edo period Japan
- Yamaoka Station, in Gifu Prefecture (formerly Tōyama Station)
- 6381 Toyama, a main-belt asteroid

== Organizations ==
- Kataller Toyama, a professional football club formed from the merger of the ALO's Hokuriku and YKK AP clubs that plays in Toyama Stadium
- Toyama Grouses, a Japanese basketball team
- Toyama-ryū, an iaido school

== People ==
- Toyama (surname), a Japanese surname

== See also ==
- Toyama Maru, a Japanese ship
