= Toyama (surname) =

Toyama (Tōyama, Tooyama, Tohyama or Touyama) is the transliteration of several Japanese surnames.

Notable people with the surname include:

- Atsuko Toyama (遠山 敦子, born 1938), Japanese karate master
- Ema Tōyama (遠山 えま, born 1981), Japanese manga artist
- Haruki Toyama (遠山 悠希, born 2003), Japanese footballer
- Itsuki Toyama (外山 斎, born 1976), Japanese politician
- Jiro Barriga Toyama (バリガ 外山 ジロ, born 1995), Panamaian footballer
- Tōyama Kagemoto (遠山 景元, 1793–1855), a samurai and official of the Tokugawa shogunate during the Edo period of Japanese history
- Kanken Tōyama (遠山 寛賢, 1888-1966), Japanese karate master
- Kathryn Toyama, pianist
- Katsuya Toyama (當山 克也, born 1967), Japanese canoeist
- Kazuhiko Toyama (外山 和彦, born 1956), Japanese composer
- Keiichiro Toyama (外山 圭一郎, born 1978), Japanese video game designer and creator of the survival horror video game series Silent Hill and Siren
- Kentaro Toyama, computer scientist
- Kiichiro Toyama (遠山 喜一郎, 1909–1999), Japanese gymnast
- Kiyohiko Toyama (遠山 清彦, born 1969), Japanese politician
- Koichi Toyama (外山 恒一, born 1970), a Japanese street musician and political activist
- Koto Toyama (遠山 向人), Japanese coach
- Kyōko Tōyama (遠山 景織子) born 1975, Japanese actress; recipient of Blue Ribbon Award for Best Newcomer
- Kyuzo Toyama (當山 久三, 1868-1910), Okinawan activist
- Toyama Masakazu (外山 正一) 1848-1900, Japanese sociologist known for writing Battōtai
- Tōyama Masasuke (遠山 政亮, 1625-1693), 1st daimyō of Yunagaya Domain
- Tōyama Masanori (遠山 政徳, 1674-1703), 2nd daimyō of Yunagaya Domain
- Michiko Toyama (1908–2000), Japanese American composer
- Michiko Tōyama (當山 美智子, born 1996), Japanese singer better known as Michi
- Toyama Midori and Chidori Toyama, stage names of Kumeko Urabe
- Tōyama Mitsuru (頭山 満, 1855–1944), nationalist political leader in early 20th-century Japan and founder of the Gen'yōsha nationalist secret society
- Mori Tōyama (塔山 森), pen name of Naoki Yamamoto (manga artist)
- Nao Tōyama (東山 奈央, born 1992), Japanese voice actress
- Seiei Toyama (遠山 正瑛, 1906-2004), recipient of Roman Magsaysay Award
- Shigeru Toyama (藤山 茂, born 1970), Japanese judoka
- Shoji Toyama (唐山 翔自, born 2002), Japanese footballer
- Shuichi Toyama (外山 秀一, born 1954), Japanese archaeologist and historian
- Tetsuo Toyama (当山 哲夫, 1883–1971), Okinawan journalist
- Tim Toyama (born 1952), American playwright
- Tōyama Tomoyoshi (遠山 友禄, 1819-1894), Japanese daimyō
- Yuichi Toyama (外山 雄一, born 1967), Japanese video game designer
- Yūsuke Tōyama (遠山 雄亮, born 1979), Japanese professional shogi player
- Yuzo Toyama (外山 雄三, 1931–2023), Japanese composer and conductor

== Fictional characters ==
- Toyama (戸山), a character in Atashin'chi
- Akira Toyama (外山 晶), a character in the manga series Bamboo Blade
- Asuka Toyama (戸山 明日香), a character in the media franchise BanG Dream!; younger sister of Kasumi Toyama
- Haruka Tōyama (遠山 遥), a character in the manga series Until Death Do Us Part
- Hiroshi Toyama (遠山 博), a character in The Ring (franchise)
- Ippei Toyama (外山 一平), a character in the manga series Whistle!
- Kasumi Toyama (戸山 香澄), a character in the media franchise BanG Dream!
- Kayo Tōyama (遠山 佳代), a character from the manga series Hitohira
- Kazuha Toyama (遠山 和葉), a character in Case Closed
- Tōyama no Kin-san (遠山の金さん), a character based on Tōyama Kagemoto
- Kinji Tōyama (遠山 金次), a character in the novel series Aria the Scarlet Ammo
- Kintaro Toyama (遠山 金太郎), a character in the manga series The Prince of Tennis
- Kintarō Tōyama (遠山 金太郎), a character in the manga series Detective School Q
- Maho Tōyama (遠山 まほ), a character in the manga series The Girl I Like Forgot Her Glasses
- Mao Toyama (遠山 麻央), a character in the manga series Dark Edge
- Megumi Toyama (遠山 恵), a character in the novel series Boogiepop
- Midori Tōyama (遠山 翠), a character in the novel series Yoake Mae yori Ruriiro na
- Riesling Tooyama (リースリング 遠山), a character in the novel Twinkle Crusaders
- Rin Toyama (遠山 りん), a character in the anime series New Game!
- Sachi Toyama (遠山 幸), a character in the anime series Jubei-chan: The Ninja Girl
- Saku Tōyama (遠山 咲), a character in the media franchise Tantei Opera Milky Holmes
- Satoru Toyama (兎山悟), a character in the anime series Wonderful PreCure!
- Shinobu Toyama (外山 忍), a character in the manga series Bamboo Blade; sister of Akira Toyama
- Tadayoshi Tooyama (遠山 忠義), a character in the manga series Rainbow: Nisha Rokubō no Shichinin
- Takeshi Toyama (富山 健), a character in the anime series Re-Main
- Tōjin Tōyama (唐山 陶人), a character in the manga series Oishinbo
