= Aoyama Tanemichi =

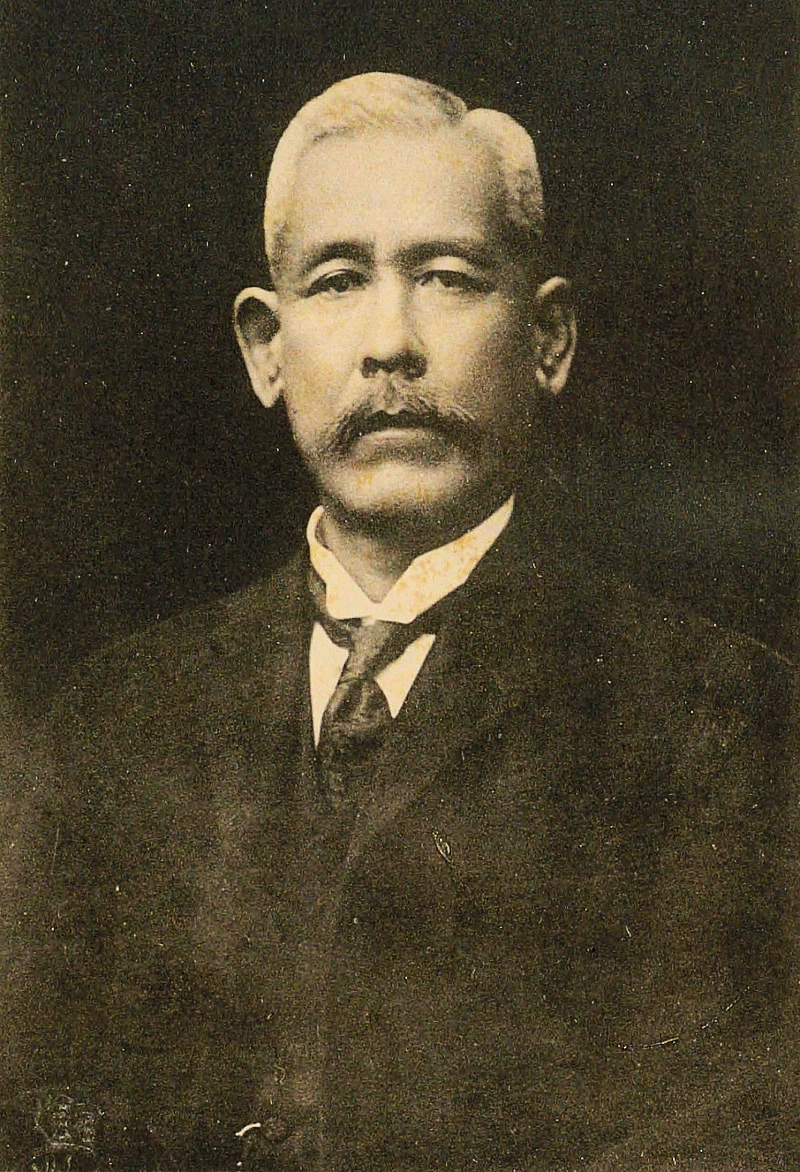
Aoyama Tanemichi

Aoyama Tanemichi (青山 胤通; June 15, 1859–December 23, 1917) was a medical scientist and doctor specializing in internal medicine. He became a member of the Imperial Japan Academy in 1906, received the first class medal, "Order of the Sacred Treasure", in 1916, and was given the title of Danshaku (baron) in 1917.

== Early life and career ==
He was born in Edo, the third son of Aoyama Kagemichi, a member of the Naegi Domain. He was employed as a pathology classroom assistant at Tokyo University after graduating from its medical school in 1882. He later studied abroad at the University of Berlin, and returned to Japan to become a professor at the Tokyo Imperial University medical college (reigning as the Aoyama of internal medicine). He later served as the headmaster at Tokyo Imperial University medical college, director of the Institute of Infectious Diseases (the present-day University of Tokyo Institute of Medical Science), and the Court Physician of Meiji Taitei (Mutsuhito the Great). In 1901, he established the Cancer Institute.

Aoymama's grave is in the Yanaka cemetery in Taito-ku. A memorial statue by Shinkai Taketaro also exists near the University of Tokyo school of pharmaceutical sciences.
