= Suzuki Shigetane =

- 鈴木 重胤
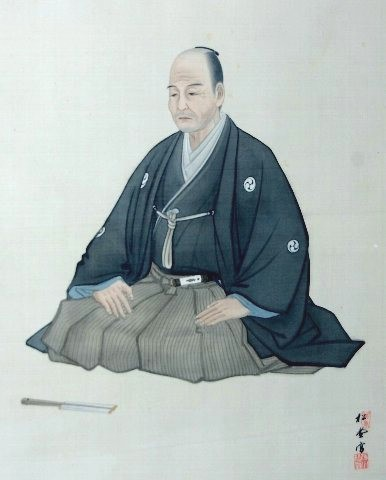

Personal details
- Born: June 13, 1812 Awaji Province, Japan
- Died: September 27, 1863 (aged 51) Edo, Musashi Province, Japan

Suzuki Katsuzaemon Shigetane (Japanese: 鈴木 勝左衛門 重胤; 1812-1863) was a Japanese kokugakusha and historian. His kokugaku pen name was Kashinoya (橿廼家; transl. "house of the oak").

== Biography ==
Suzuki Shigetane was the fifth son of Hozumi Shigetaka (穂積 重威), the hereditary head of a small village in Awaji Province. He studied kokugaku with his father from an early age, and continued his studies even after he moved to Osaka and later Kobe to work as an apprentice.

Suzuki began kokugaku studies under Hirata Atsutane in 1832, and was associated with the Hirata school for most of the remainder of his life. He later moved to Edo where he built a house.

Suzuki traveled deep into Ōu in order to promote kokugaku studies there. With the patronage of the Ōtaki (大滝) family of Dewa Province, Suzuki began work on his Nihonshoki-den (日本書紀伝), a commentary on the Nihon Shoki.

Suzuki gradually came to disagree with the Hirata school, and by 1857 he was in conflict with Atsutane's successor Hirata Kanetane.

In 1858, Kanetane excommunicated Suzuki from the school for heresy. This came about after Suzuki had investigated mechanisms and precedents for removing unworthy Emperors from the throne (廃帝) in the manner of Emperor Yōzei, with special concern for the possibility that a future Emperor might convert to Christianity or otherwise come to doubt the legendary origin of the Imperial line.

In 1863, several years later, Suzuki was murdered at his home in Edo. The assassin was alleged to have been either Aoyama Kagemichi, Itō Masura (伊藤 益荒), or Umemura Shin'ichirō (梅村 真一郎).

At the time he was murdered, Suzuki had not finished the Nihonshoki-den and had only reached as far as the 15th volume, "On the Descent of the Heavenly Grandson" (天孫降臨章, Tenson kōrin shō). Suzuki's draft of the manuscript was completed with remarkable speed and contains almost no errors or omissions. Ibaraki Yoshiyuki comments that if Suzuki had not been killed, his completed work would likely have compared favorably even with Motoori Norinaga's great Kojiki-den. The 15 completed volumes of the Nihonshoki-den show Suzuki's simple and straightforward interpretation of the text.

== See also ==
- Fujiwara no Mototsune, who removed a reigning Emperor from the throne in 884
