= Naegi Castle =

Castle in Nakatsugawa, Gifu Prefecture, Japan

- 苗木城
- Nakatsugawa, Gifu Prefecture, Japan
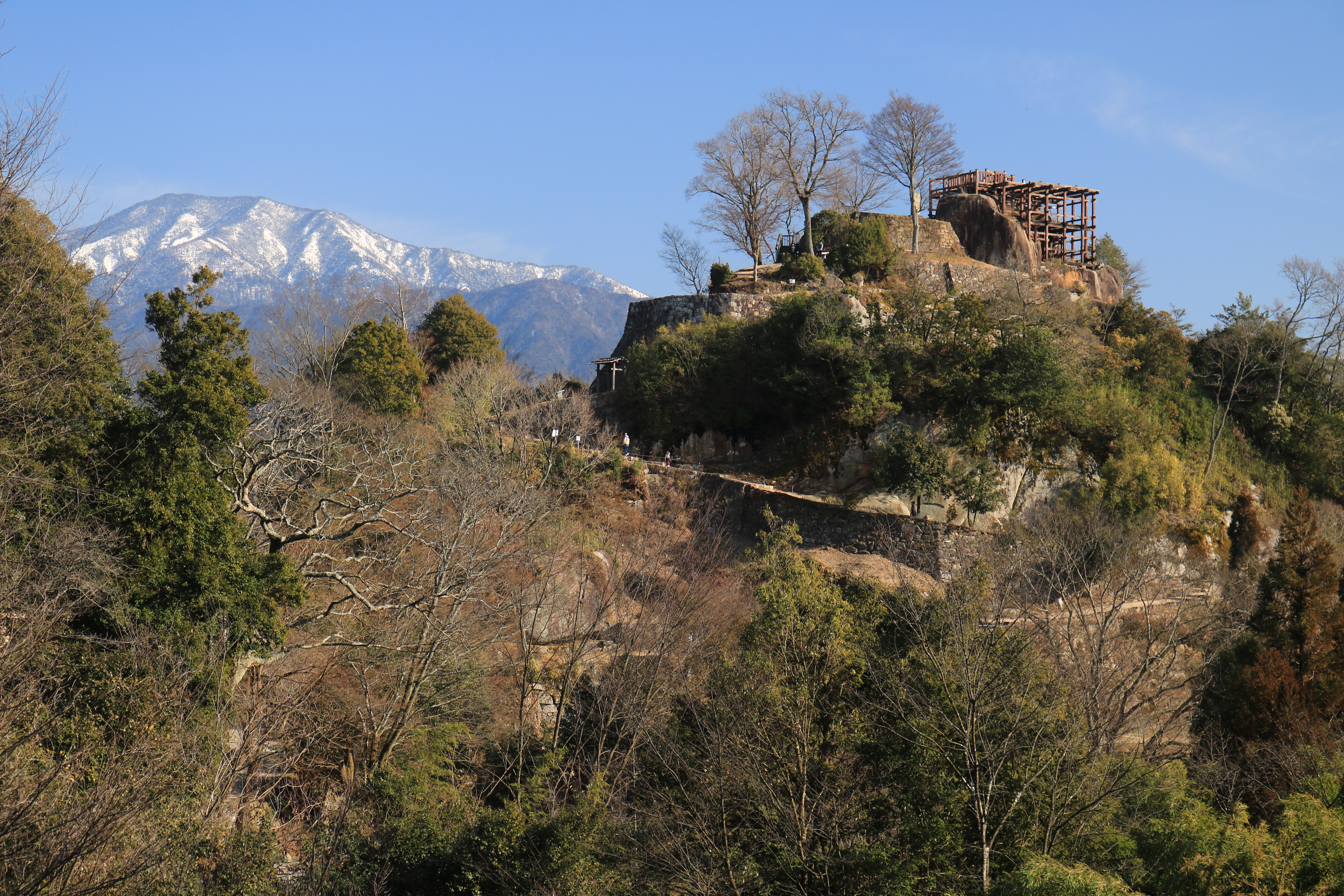
- Naegi Castle and Mount Ena

Site information
- Type: Yamajiro-style Japanese castle
- Open to the public: yes
- Condition: ruins

Location
- Naegi Castle
- Location within Gifu Prefecture Location within Japan
- Coordinates: 35°30′47.1″N 137°29′6.94″E

Site history
- Built: 1532-1555
- In use: Edo period
- Demolished: 1871

Naegi Castle (苗木城, Naegi-jō) was a Japanese castle that formed the administrative center of Naegi Domain, a feudal domain of the Tōyama clan, located in what is now part of the city of Nakatsugawa in Gifu Prefecture, Japan. It also referred to as the Misty Castle (霞ケ城, Kasumi-ga-jō), Naegi Castle was also known as "Akakabe Castle", as its walls were not white like many Japanese castles, but made with a reddish colored clay. The ruins have been protected as a National Historic Site since 1981.

== History ==
The Tōyama clan were rulers of southeastern Mino Province since at least the Kamakura period. Naegi Castle was constructed in 1532 by Tōyama Naokado, the second son of Tōyama Kagetomo, the lord of Iwamura Castle and husband of Oda Nobunaga’s sister, Otsuya no Kata. His daughter was adopted by Nobunaga, and married to Takeda Katsuyori in an effort to stave off Takeda designs on Mino. After Iwamura Castle fell to the Takeda, Nobunaga considered Naegi Castle to be the most important defense against the Takeda clan.

However, following the assassination of Nobunaga in 1583 at the Honnō-ji Incident, the castle fell into the hands of Mori Nagayoshi, one of Toyotomi Hideyoshi's generals. The Mori assigned Kawajiri Hidenaga as castellan and the Tōyama clan fled to Hamamatsu, where they went into the service of Tokugawa Ieyasu.

At the Battle of Sekigahara in 1600, Kawajiri sided with the pro-Toyotomi Western Army under Ishida Mitsunari, and was killed in battle. Ieyasu sent Tōyama Tomomasa, the son of its former castellan to retake Naegi Castle. Afterwards, he was confirmed as a daimyō over his clan's ancestral holdings, which marked the start of Naegi Domain under the Tokugawa shogunate. The Tōyama clan remained at the castle through 12 generations until the Meiji Restoration.

Naegi Castle was abandoned and dismantled in 1871, with its furnishing and most of the buildings’ timbers being auctioned off to help pay off the domain's massive debt. Today, a restoration of the main keep strut-work now serves as a lookout over Nakatsugawa and the Kiso River. There is a museum below the castle site with a diorama showing what the castle looked like before its destruction.

== Description ==
Naegi Castle occupies a very unusual layout on a bluff called "Mount Takamori" (432 meters) overlooking the Kiso River and the Nakasendō highway. This was a very strategic location, as it controlled both land and river routes between Owari Province and Mino Province.

The castle's layout utilizes the Kiso River as a natural moat to one side. The main gate of the castle was located at the foot of the mountain on the right bank of the Kiso River, and a steep road led to the top of the mountain with 48 sharp turns. The top of the hill was stripped of vegetation and soil; however the exposed massive boulders were left intact and were incorporated into the defensive walls. On top of the hill, an elaborate framework of timber formed a platform, on which the tenshu was constructed. The tenshu itself was nine meters wide by eleven meters long, and stood three floors high. The summit was surrounded by the Ni-no-maru enclosure in a spiral shape, with the palace located slightly lower on the mountain on the west side. Some of the outer stone walls of the castle were renovated in the Edo period, but the walls in the southwestern portion of the main bailey date from the Sengoku period.

The castle was listed as one of the Continued Top 100 Japanese Castles in 2017. The castle site is located about 17 minutes by car from Nakatsugawa Station on the JR East Chūō Main Line.

== Gallery ==
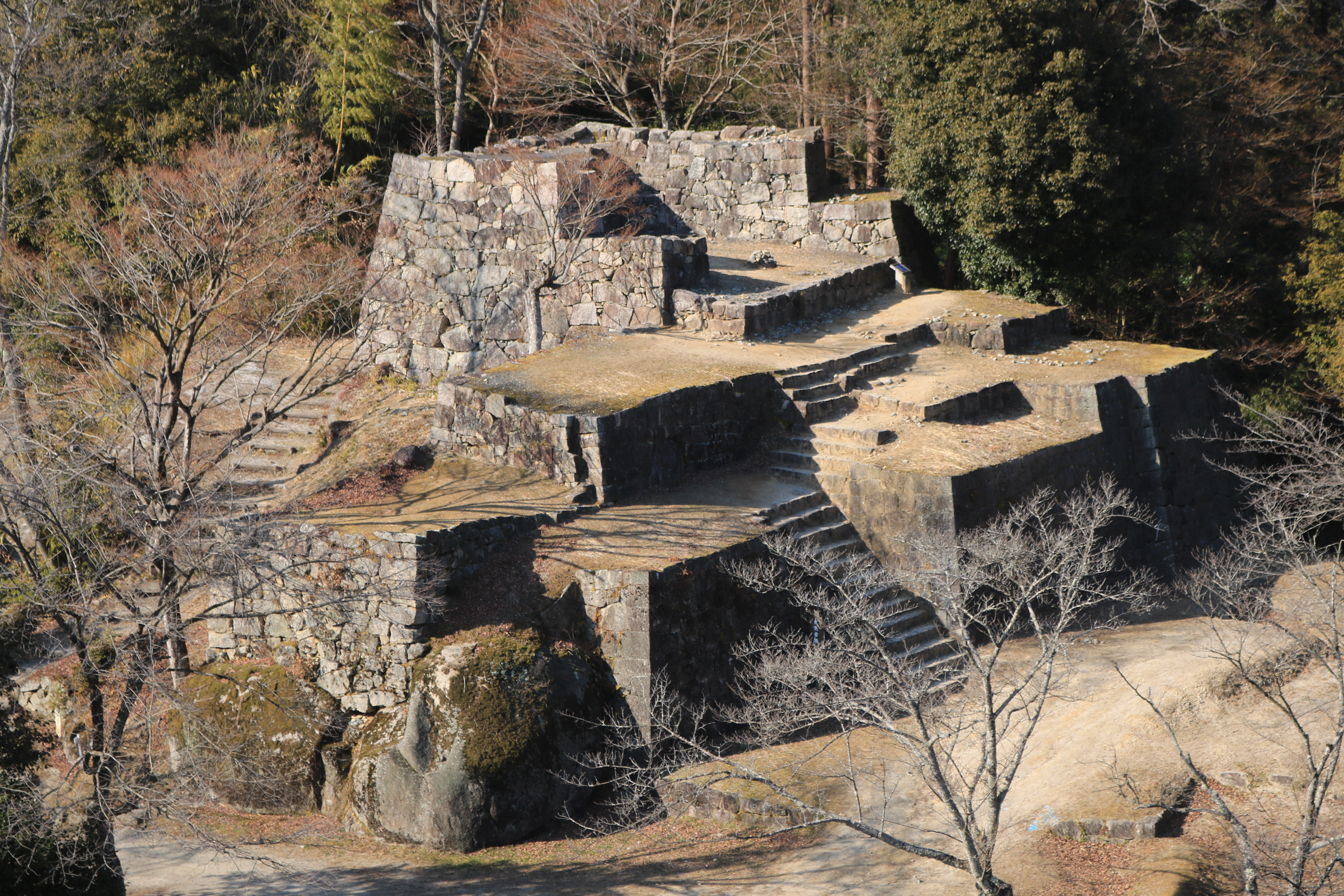
Naegi Castle Sannomaru

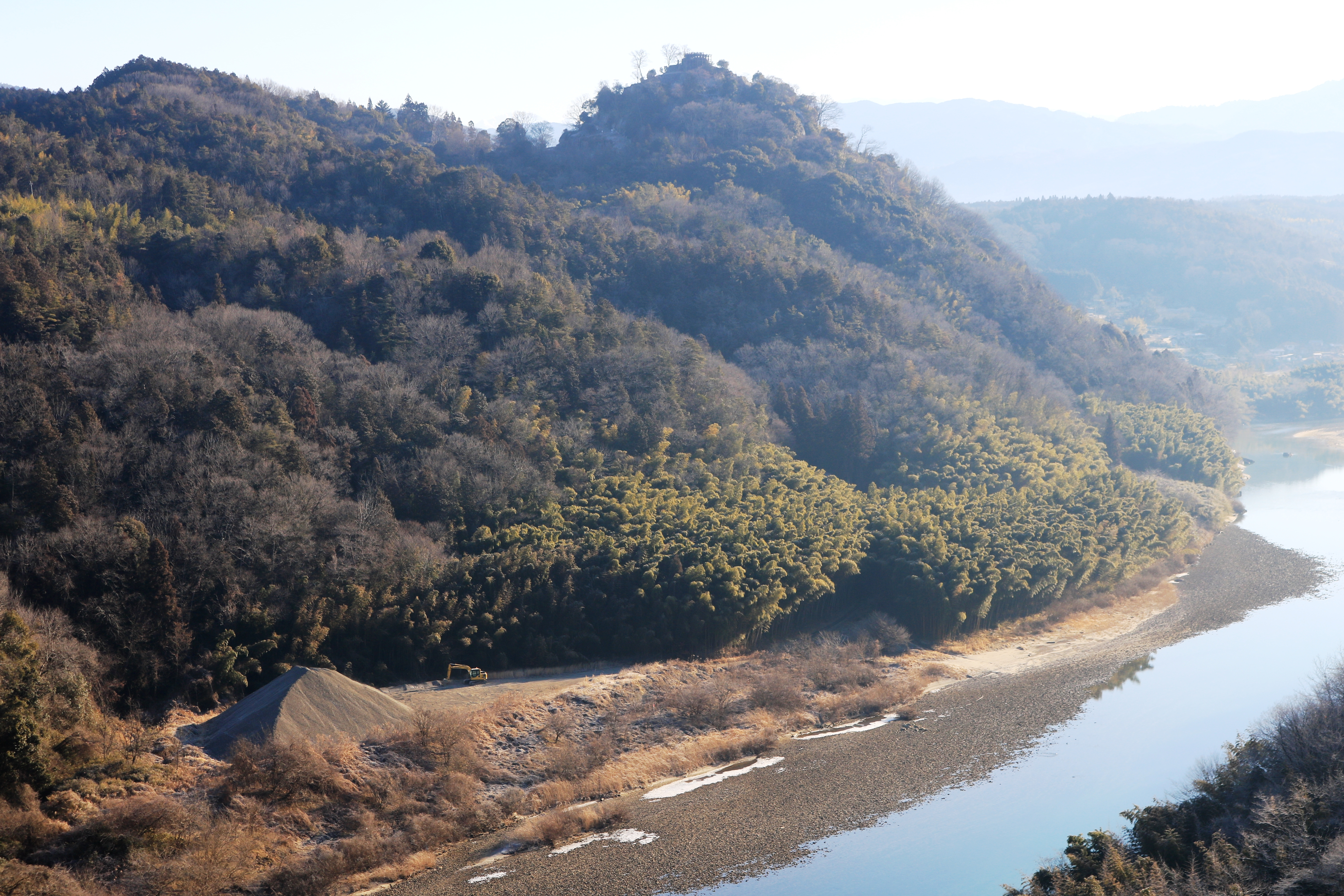
Naegi Castle from Shiroyama Bridge

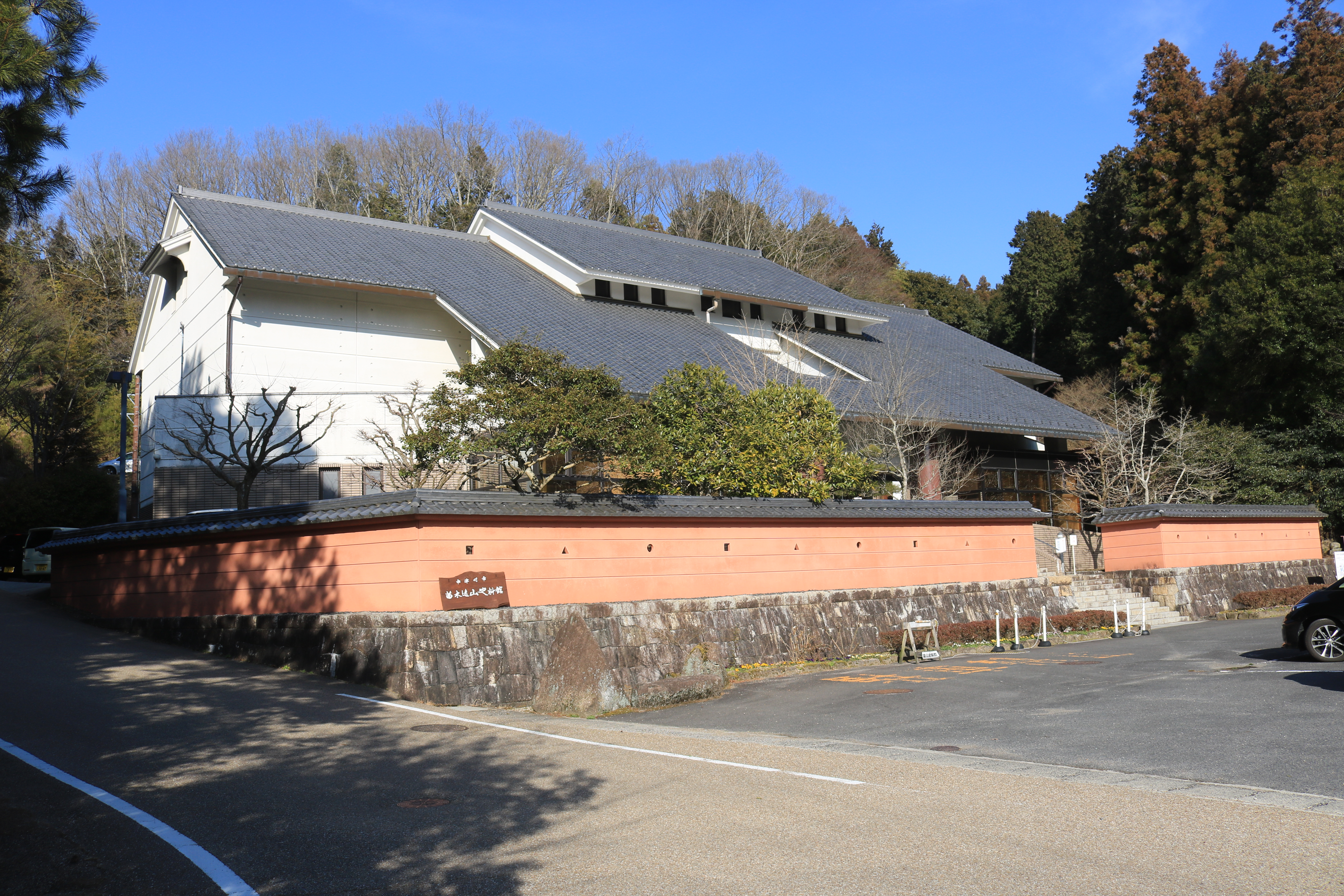
Toyama Historical Museum

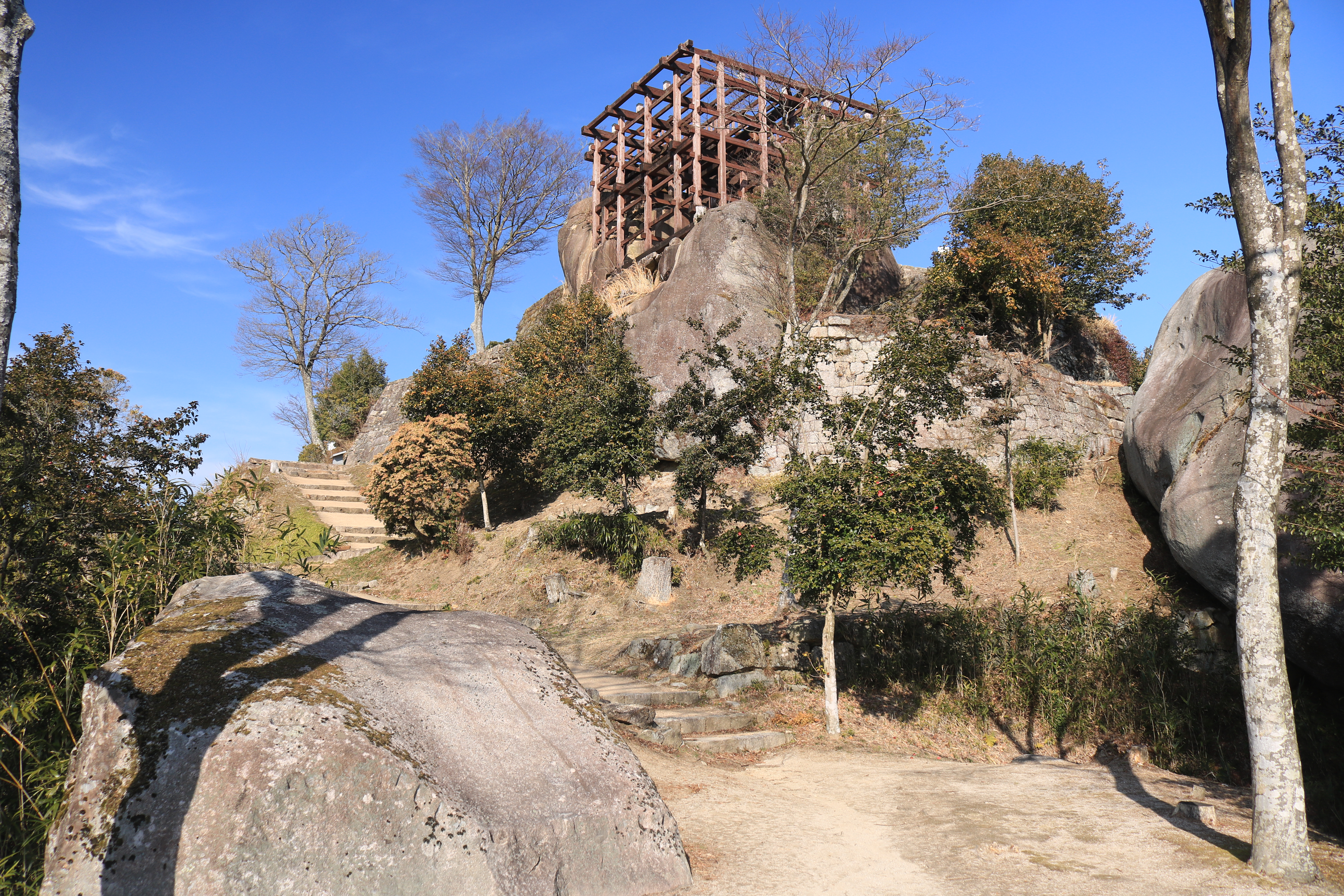
Observation deck of Naegi Castle

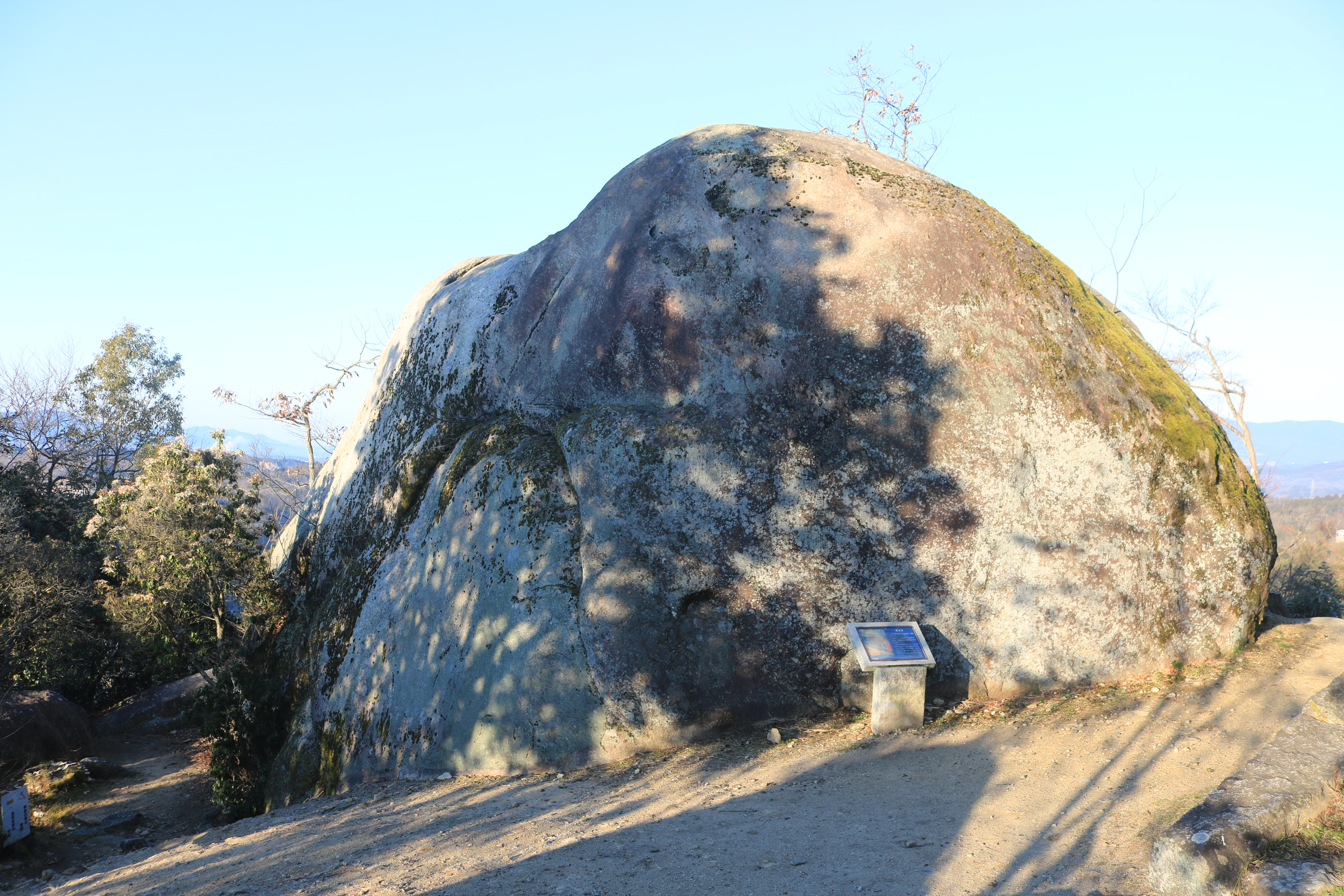
Umaarai Iwa

== See also ==
- List of Historic Sites of Japan (Gifu)

== Literature ==
- De Lange, William (2021). An Encyclopedia of Japanese Castles. Groningen: Toyo Press. pp. 600 pages. ISBN 978-9492722300.
- Schmorleitz, Morton S. (1974). Castles in Japan. Tokyo: Charles E. Tuttle Co. pp. 144–145. ISBN 0-8048-1102-4.
- Motoo, Hinago (1986). Japanese Castles. Tokyo: Kodansha. p. 200 pages. ISBN 0-87011-766-1.
- Mitchelhill, Jennifer (2004). Castles of the Samurai: Power and Beauty. Tokyo: Kodansha. p. 112 pages. ISBN 4-7700-2954-3.
- Turnbull, Stephen (2003). Japanese Castles 1540-1640. Osprey Publishing. p. 64 pages. ISBN 1-84176-429-9.
