= Yunagaya Domain =

Minor fudai feudal domain of Edo period Japan

Yunagaya Domain 湯長谷藩
- under Tokugawa shogunate Japan
- 1670–1871
- Capital: Yunagaya jin'ya
- Area
  - Coordinates: 36°59′27″N 140°50′38″E
- Government
  - Type: Daimyō
- Historical era: Edo period
  - Split from Iwakitaira Domain: 1670
  - Disestablished: 1871
- Today part of: part of Iwaki, Fukushima, Japan

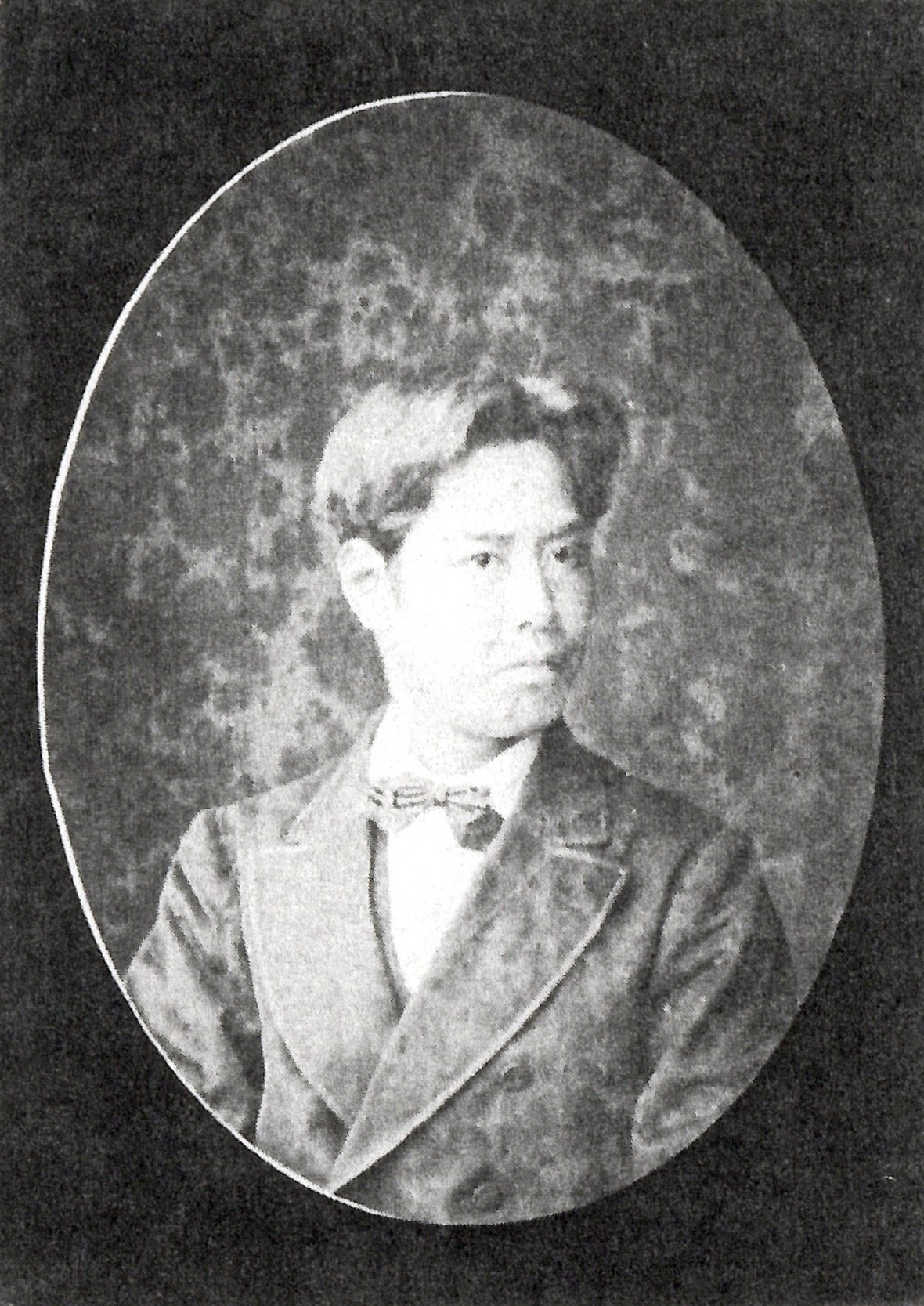
Naitō Masayasu

Yunagaya Domain (湯長谷藩, Yunagaya-han) was a minor fudai feudal domain under the Tokugawa shogunate of Edo period Japan. based in southern Mutsu Province in what is now part of modern-day Iwaki, Fukushima. It was ruled for the entirety of its history by the Naitō clan. The domain was initially known as Yumoto Domain (湯本藩, Yumoto-han)

== History ==
In 1622, the 70,000 koku Iwakitaira Domain was assigned to Naitō Masanaga. In 1670, his son and 2nd daimyō Naitō Tadaoki transferred 10,000 koku of newly developed rice lands to his younger son, Tōyama Masasuke, creating a subsidiary domain based at Yumoto jin'ya. In 1676, Masasuke moved the location of his jin'ya from Yumoto to nearby Yunagaya and laid out the foundations of his castle town. In 1680, as a reward to helping suppress a rebellion by Naitō Tadakatsu, the daimyō of Toba Domain, he was awarded an additional 2000 koku estate in Tamba Province. He served as castellan of Osaka Castle in 1687, and was rewarded with another 3000 koku in Kawachi Province, bringing the kokudaka of the domain to 15,000 koku.

Although the Naitō clan in Iwakidaira were transferred to Nobeoka Domain in distant Kyushu by the shogunate due to mismanagement in 1747, the Naitō of Yunagaya remained until the end of the Tokugawa shogunate despite a propensity of its rulers to die young and without heir. The 4th daimyō, Naitō Masaatsu, codified the domain’s laws, and the 10th daimyō, Naitō Masatami established a domain academy. In 1855, significant coal deposits were found within the domain.

At the time of the Meiji restoration, the 13th daimyō, Naitō Masayasu was still an infant. The domain joined the Ōuetsu Reppan Dōmei during the Boshin War, but was captured by Imperial forces without a struggle. The domain was reduced by only 1000 koku, and Masayasu was forced to abdicate in favor of the 14th and last daimyō, Naitō Masanori in 1869. He remained as imperial governor until the abolition of the han system in July 1871.

== Holdings at the end of the Edo period ==
As with most domains in the han system, Yunagaya Domain consisted of several discontinuous territories calculated to provide the assigned kokudaka, based on periodic cadastral surveys and projected agricultural yields.

- Mutsu Province (Iwaki)
  - 6 villages in Kikuta District
  - 27 villages in Iwasaki District
- Tamba Province
  - 2 villages in Hikami District
  - 1 village in Ikaruga District

== List of daimyō ==
- Naitō clan, 1622-1871 (fudai)

#	Name	Tenure	Courtesy title	Court Rank	kokudaka
1	Tōyama Masasuke (遠山政亮)	1670–1693	Tonomo-no-kami (主殿頭)	Junior 5th Rank, Lower Grade (従五位下)	10,000 -->15,000 koku
2	Tōyama Masanori (遠山政徳)	1693–1703	Naizen-no-kami (内膳正)	Junior 5th Rank, Lower Grade (従五位下)	15,000 koku
3	Naitō Masasada (内藤政貞)	1703–1722	Tonomo-no-kami (主殿頭)	Junior 5th Rank, Lower Grade (従五位下)	15,000 koku
4	Naitō Masaatsu (内藤政醇)	1722–1741	Harima-no-kami (播磨守)	Junior 5th Rank, Lower Grade (従五位下)	15,000 koku
5	Naitō Masanobu (内藤政業)	1741–1761	Harima-no-kami (播磨守)	Junior 5th Rank, Lower Grade (従五位下)	15,000 koku
6	Naitō Sadayoshi (内藤貞幹)	1761–1778	Inaba-no-kami (因幡守)	Junior 5th Rank, Lower Grade (従五位下)	15,000 koku
7	Naitō Masahiro (内藤政広)	1778–1787	-none-	-none-	15,000 koku
8	Naitō Masayuki (内藤政偏)	1787–1799	Tonomo-no-kami (主殿頭)	Junior 5th Rank, Lower Grade (従五位下)	15,000 koku
9	Naitō Masaakira (内藤政環)	1799–1824	Harima-no-kami (播磨守)	Junior 5th Rank, Lower Grade (従五位下)	15,000 koku
10	Naitō Masatami (内藤政民)	1824–1855	Inaba-no-kami (因幡守)	Junior 5th Rank, Lower Grade (従五位下)	15,000 koku
11	Naitō Masatsune (内藤政恒)	1855–1859	Harima-no-kami (播磨守)	Junior 5th Rank, Lower Grade (従五位下)	15,000 koku
12	Naitō Masatoshi (内藤政敏)	1859–1863	Inaba-no-kami (因幡守)	Junior 5th Rank, Lower Grade (従五位下)	15,000 koku
13	Naitō Masayasu (内藤政養)	1863–1868	Inaba-no-kami (因幡守)	Junior 5th Rank, Lower Grade (従五位下)	15,000 koku
14	Naitō Masanori (内藤政憲)	1868–1871	-none-	Lower 5th (従五位下)	15,000 -->14,000 koku

=== Tōyama Masasuke ===
Tōyama Masasuke (遠山政亮; 1625-December 3, 1693) was the 1st daimyō of Yunagaya Domain. He was the 3rd son of Naito Tadaoki, the 2nd daimyō of Iwakitaira Domain. In December 1670, when his father retired from public life, he separated out a 10,000 koku holding and authorized Masasuke to set up his own household as daimyō of Yumoto Domain (湯本藩, Yumoto han). In November 1676, he relocated his seat to Yunagaya, and the domain was renamed accordingly. Masasuke built Yunagaya Castle and the surrounding castle town. In 1680, an incident occurred at Zōjō-ji in Edo, wherein Naitō Tadakatsu (daimyō of Toba Domain) attacked and killed Nagai Nonage (daimyō of Miyazu Domain). Naitō Tadakatsu was forced to commit seppuku, and Masasuke inherited 2000 koku of his holdings in Tamba Province. In 1687, Masasuke was selected to serve in the guards at Osaka Castle, and his revenues were increased by another 3000 koku. His courtesy title was Tonomo-no-kami, and his Court rank was Junior Fifth Rank, Lower Grade. He died while in service at Osaka and his grave is at the Naitō Cemetery at Kōmyō-ji in Kamakura. Masasuke was married to a daughter of Sanada Nobuyuki, but had no children.

=== Tōyama Masanori ===
Tōyama Masanori (遠山政徳; 1674-June 26, 1703) was the 2nd daimyō of Yunagaya Domain. He was the 2nd son of Hori Naoyuki, the son of Hori Naokage, daimyō of Kariya Domain and was adopted by Tōyama Massuke to be his heir in 1690. He became daimyō in 1694. His courtesy title was Naizen-no-kami, and his court rank was Junior Fifth Rank, Lower Grade. However, Masanori never married and died childless at the age of 30 in 1703. His grave is at the Naitō Cemetery at Kōmyō-ji in Kamakura.

=== Naitō Masasada ===
Naitō Masasada (内藤政貞; 1685-June 6, 1722) was the 3rd daimyō of Yunagaya Domain. He was the 2nd son of Hijikata Katsuyoshi, a 200 koku hatamoto; however, his great-grandmother was the daughter of Naitō Masanaga and his wife was a daughter of Naitō Tadaoki. He was posthumously adopted as heir to Masanori in 1703, and died in 1722 at the age of 38. His courtesy title was Tonomo-no-kami, and his court rank was Junior Fifth Rank, Lower Grade. His grave is at the Naitō Cemetery at Kōmyō-ji in Kamakura.

=== Naitō Masaatsu ===
Naitō Masaatsu (内藤政醇; 1711-October 14, 1741) was the 4th daimyō of Yunagaya Domain. He was the son of Naitō Masasada and became daimyō at the age of two on his father’s death in 1722. He was received in formal audience by Shōgun Tokugawa Ieshige in 1755. His wife was a daughter of Kuroda Naokuni, daimyō of Shimodate Domain. His courtesy title was Harima-no-kami, and his court rank was Junior Fifth Rank, Lower Grade. He died in 1741 in Yunagaya shortly after returning from sankin kōtai in Edo at the age of 31. His grave is at the temple of Ryūshō-ji in Iwaki, Fukushima.

A highly fictionalized Naitō Masaatsu was the main character in the 2014 jidaigeki comedy film Samurai Hustle, where he was played by actor Kuranosuke Sasaki.

=== Naitō Masanobu ===
Naitō Masanobu (内藤政業; 1740-1769) was the 5th daimyō of Yunagaya Domain. He was the son of Naitō Masaatsu and became daimyō of his father’s death in 1741. He was received in formal audience by Shōgun Tokugawa Yoshimune. His courtesy title was Harima-no-kami, and his court rank was Junior Fifth Rank, Lower Grade. He turned the domain over to his adopted son, Naitō Sadayoshi in 1761 for unknown reasons and went into retirement. He died in 1769, and his grave is at the Naitō Cemetery at Kōmyō-ji in Kamakura, although some records indicate that he may have lived to 1811. He never married.

=== Naitō Sadayoshi ===
Naitō Sadayoshi (内藤貞幹; 12 December 1746-17 July 1778) was the 6th daimyō of Yunagaya Domain. He was the sixth son of Tokugawa Munenao of Kii Domain and his wife was the daughter of Hijikata Katsumasa, daimyō of Komono Domain. He became daimyō in 1761 after his adopted father was received in formal audience by Shōgun Tokugawa Ieharu and unexpectedly went into retirement immediately thereafter. He had four sons and one daughter. He died in 1778 at the age of 33, and his grave is at the Naitō Cemetery at Kōmyō-ji in Kamakura.

=== Naitō Masahiro ===
Naitō Masahiro (内藤政広; 1770-23 October 1787) was the 7th daimyō of Yunagaya Domain. He was the second son of Naitō Sadayoshi. He became daimyō in 1778 on his father’s death. During his tenure, the domain suffered greatly from the Great Tenmei famine on 1782. He died in 1787 at the age of 18, and his grave is at the Naitō Cemetery at Kōmyō-ji in Kamakura.

=== Naitō Masayuki ===
Naitō Masayuki (内藤政偏; 23 September 1773 - 4 November 1787) was the 8th daimyō of Yunagaya Domain. He was the younger brother of Naitō Masahiro and the fourth son of Naitō Sadayoshi. He became daimyō in 1787 on the unexpected death of his brother. He was married to the daughter of Matsudaira Yorikata of Saijō Domain. He was received in formal audience by Shōgun Tokugawa Ienari in 1790. His courtesy title was Tonomo-no-kami, and his court rank was Junior Fifth Rank, Lower Grade. He died in 1799 at the age of 27 and without heir, and his grave is at the Naitō Cemetery at Kōmyō-ji in Kamakura.

=== Naitō Masaakira ===
Naitō Masaakira (内藤政環; 18 November 1785 - 3 October 1836) was the 9th daimyō of Yunagaya Domain. He was the 10th son of Mizuno Tadakane, daimyō of Karatsu Domain, and was posthumously adopted in 1799 to be heir of Naitō Masayuki. He married the daughter of Naitō Masatame, the eldest son of Naitō Sadayoshi, who had died young. His courtesy title was Harima-no-kami, and his court rank was Junior Fifth Rank, Lower Grade. During his tenure, the domain suffered from floods in 1821 followed by drought in 1821. He retired in 1824 and died in 1836 at age 52. His grave is at the Naitō Cemetery at Kōmyō-ji in Kamakura.

=== Naitō Masatami ===
Naitō Masatami (内藤政民; 21 September 1806 - 23 October 1855) was the 10th daimyō of Yunagaya Domain. He was the 5th son of Sakai Tadaari, daimyō of Shōnai Domain, and was adopted in 1824 to be heir of Naitō Masaakira when the latter unexpectedly decided to retire. He married the daughter of Naitō Masaakira. he built a han school modelled after the Chidōkan in his native Dewa Province, at which he also acted as an instructor. His courtesy title was Inaba-no-kami, and his court rank was Junior Fifth Rank, Lower Grade. He died in 1855 at age 50. His grave is at the Naitō Cemetery at Kōmyō-ji in Kamakura.

=== Naitō Masatsune ===
Naitō Masatsune (内藤政恒; 29 December 1836 - 17 November 1859) was the 11th daimyō of Yunagaya Domain. He was the 3rd son of Matsudaira Mitsutsune, daimyō of Matsumoto Domain, and was adopted in 1855 to be heir of Naitō Masatami, who had only four daughters. His courtesy title was Harima-no-kami, and his court rank was Junior Fifth Rank, Lower Grade. However, he died only 4 years later in 1859 at the age of 24. His grave is at the Naitō Cemetery at Kōmyō-ji in Kamakura.

=== Naitō Masatoshi ===
Naitō Masatoshi (内藤政敏; 25 August 1843 - 11 August 1863) was the 12th daimyō of Yunagaya Domain. He was the eldest son of Naitō Masashige, daimyō of Komoro Domain and was adopted in 1859 to be the posthumous heir to Naitō Masatsune. However, he died only 4 years later in 1863 at the age of 21. His courtesy title was Inaba-no-kami, and his court rank was Junior Fifth Rank, Lower Grade. His grave is at the Naitō Cemetery at Kōmyō-ji in Kamakura.

=== Naitō Masayasu ===
Naitō Masayasu (内藤政養; 26 August 1857 - 6 March 1911) was the 13th daimyō of Yunagaya Domain. He was the posthumous third son of Naitō Masatsune, the 11th daimyō of Yunagaya and was adopted by Naito Masatoshi as his heir. He became daimyō on Masatoshi’s death in 1863. His courtesy title was Inaba-no-kami, and his court rank was Junior Fifth Rank, Lower Grade. In early 1868, the domain received orders from the new Meiji government to participate in the Battle of Aizu during the Boshin War; however, one month later, the domain joined the pro-Tokugawa Ōuetsu Reppan Dōmei instead. Masayasu was only 12 years old at the time. Meiji government forces occupied Yunagaya one month later, and Masayasu fled to Sendai. He surrendered to the Meiji government that autumn and was ordered to Tokyo, where he was placed under house arrest. He was forced to retire in favor of his adopted son, Masanori, and the domain was punished by the government by a reduction in its kokudaka of 1000 koku. He died in 1911 at the age of 55. His grave is at the Naitō Cemetery at Kōmyō-ji in Kamakura.

=== Naitō Masanori ===
Naitō Masanori (内藤政憲; 3 March 1848 - 24 March 1919) was the 14th and final daimyō of Yunagaya Domain. He born the son of the kuge Oinomikado Ietaka. The Meiji government ordered him to succeed Naitō Masaysu, then under house arrest in Tokyo for the domain’s participation in the pro-Tokugawa Ōuetsu Reppan Dōmei in 1869. Later that year, when the position of daimyō was abolished, he became imperial governor, and continued to rule Yunagaya even after the abolition of the han system in 1871. He retired in December 1881 and died in 1919 at age 72. His grave is at the Naitō Cemetery at Kōmyō-ji in Kamakura.

== See also ==
- List of Han
