= Naegi Domain =

Feudal domain of Edo period Japan

Naegi Domain 苗木藩
- Domain of Japan
- 1600–1871
- Capital: Naegi Castle
  - Type: Daimyō
- Historical era: Edo period
  - Established: 1600
  - Disestablished: 1871
- Today part of: Gifu Prefecture

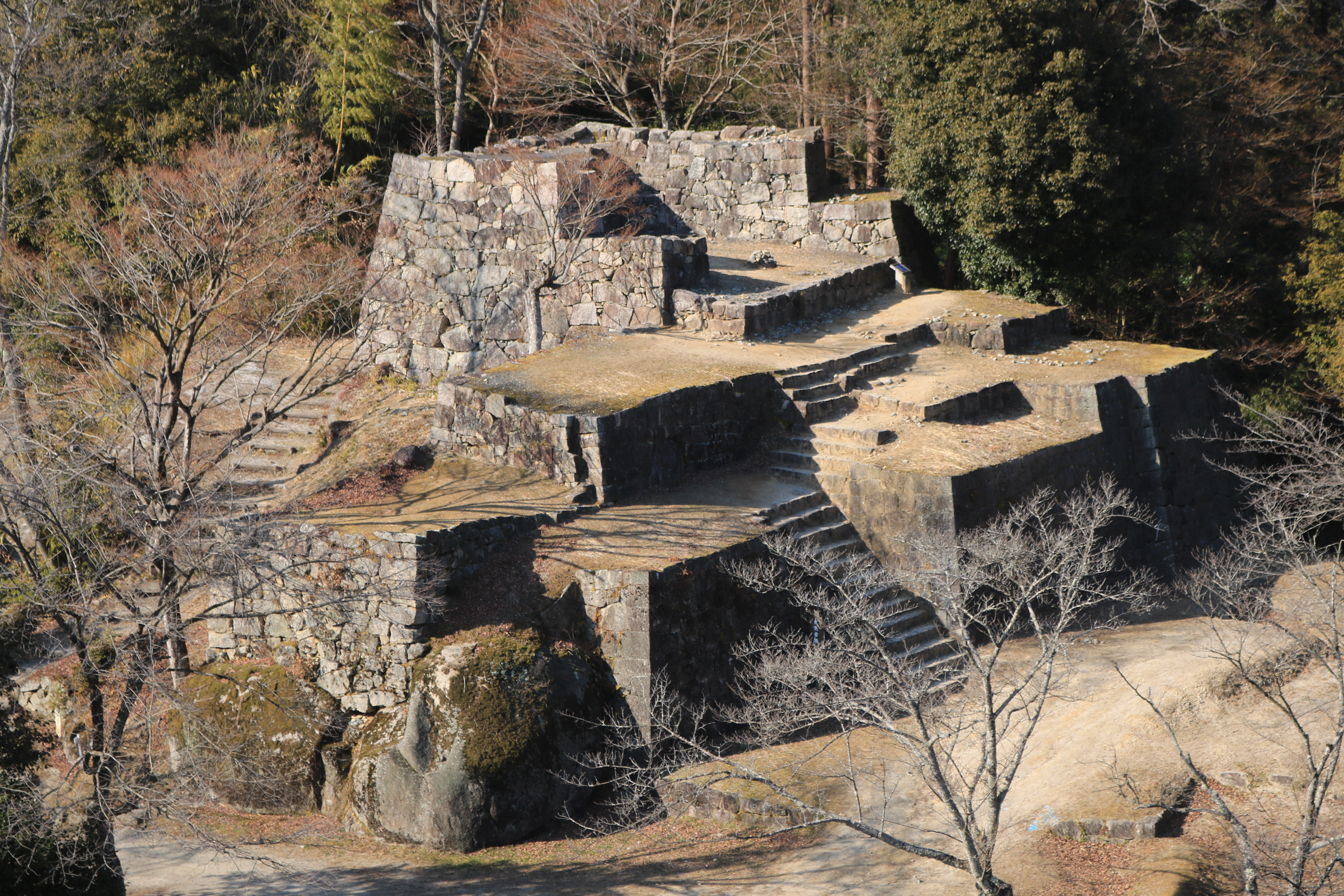
Ruins of Naegi Castle

Naegi Domain (苗木藩, Naegi-han) was a feudal domain of Edo period Japan It was located in Mino Province, in central Honshū. The domain was centered at Naegi Castle, located in what is now the city of Nakatsugawa in Gifu Prefecture. It is the smallest domain within the Tokugawa shogunate which was styled as a “castle holding domain”.

== History ==
The Tōyama clan were rulers of this portion of southeast Mino Province (a portion of the districts of Kamo and Ena) since the Kamakura period. Toyama Tomotada and his son Toyama Tomomasa pledged fealty to Oda Nobunaga. However, after Nobunaga’s death, their territory was overrun by the Mōri clan, and was given to Kawajiri Hidenaga. The Toyama fled to Hamamatsu, where they sought protection from Tokugawa Ieyasu. During the Battle of Sekigahara, Kawajiri Hidenaga sided with the pro-Toyotomi Western Army under Ishida Mitsunari, and was killed in battle. Ieyasu sent Toyama Tomomasa to retake his clan’s ancestral domains. With the establishment of the Tokugawa shogunate, he was confirmed as daimyō of the 10,500 koku Naegi Domain. Tomomasa went on to participate in the Siege of Osaka, and died in Naegi in 1619.

The domain remained in the hands of the Tōyama clan throughout its existence. However, as a small domain with heavy expenditures, it soon fell into severe debt, which continued to mount from generation to generation, despite efforts to open new rice lands, impose fiscal frugality, and the issuance of paper currency on several occasions. .

The 12th daimyō, Tōyama Tomoyoshi, served as wakadoshiyori for two terms during the Bakumatsu period and led the domain’s forces in the Second Chōshū expedition.

At the time of the Meiji restoration, the domain was 143,000 gold ryō and 15,900 paper ryō in debt. When Naegi Castle was pulled down by order of the new government, its furnishing and timber were all sold as part of the effort the repay this debt. The stipend received from the government as compensation for relinquishing the domain also went towards debt repayment, and many samurai were forced to abandon their social status in order to take up money-making trades. By August 1871, at the time of the abolition of the han system, the debt had been reduced to 52,600 gold and 5000 paper ryō. The former domain lands were absorbed into Gifu Prefecture; however, due to the remaining debt, all samurai left in the domain were reduced to commoner status, and were denied the government stipend promised to their social class. This created great discontent, and the State Councilor responsible, Aoyama Naomichi, faced several assassination attempts, the last of which was in 1891.

== Bakumatsu period holdings ==
As with most domains in the han system, Naegi Domain consisted of a discontinuous territories calculated to provide the assigned kokudaka, based on periodic cadastral surveys and projected agricultural yields.

- Mino Province
  - 34 villages in Kamo District,
  - 13 villages in Ina District

== List of daimyō ==
- Tōyama clan (fudai) 1600-1871

	Name	Tenure	Courtesy title	Court Rank	kokudaka
1	Tōyama Tomomasa (遠山友政)	1600-1620	-none-	-none-	10,500 koku
2	Tōyama Tomohide (遠山秀友)	1620–1642	Gyōbu-no-shō (刑部少輔)	unknown -	10,500 koku
3	Tōyama Tomosada (遠山友貞)	1642–1675	Shinano-no-kami (信濃守)	Junior 5th Rank, Lower Grade (従五位下)	10,500 koku
4	Tōyama Tomomasa (遠山友春)	1675–1712	Izumi-no-kami (和泉守)	Junior 5th Rank, Lower Grade (従五位下)	10,500 koku
5	Tōyama Tomoyoshi (遠山友由)	1712–1722	Iyo-no-kami (伊予守)	Junior 5th Rank, Lower Grade (従五位下)	10,500 koku
6	Tōyama Tomomasa (遠山友将)	1722–1732	Buzen-no-kami (豊前守)	Junior 5th Rank, Lower Grade (従五位下)	10,500 koku
7	Tōyama Tomonaka (遠山友央)	1732–1740	Izumi-no-kami (和泉守)	Junior 5th Rank, Lower Grade (従五位下)	10,500 ->10,000 koku
8	Tōyama Tomoakira (遠山友明)	1740–1753	Tango-no-kami (丹後守)	Junior 5th Rank, Lower Grade (従五位下)	10,000 koku
9	Tōyama Tomokiyo (遠山友清)	1753–1777	Dewa-no-kami (出羽守)	Junior 4th Rank, Lower Grade (従四位下)	10,000 koku
10	Tōyama Tomoyori (遠山友随)	1777-1792	Omi-no-kami (近江守)	Junior 5th Rank, Lower Grade (従五位下)	10,000 koku
11	Tōyama Tomoisa (遠山友寿)	1792–1838	Mino-no-kami (美濃守)	Junior 5th Rank, Lower Grade (従五位下)	10,000 koku
12	Tōyama Tomoyoshi (遠山友禄)	1839–1871	Mino-no-kami (美濃守)	Junior 5th Rank, Lower Grade (従五位下)	21,000 koku

== See also ==
- List of Han
