= Tōyama Tomoyoshi =

- 遠山友禄
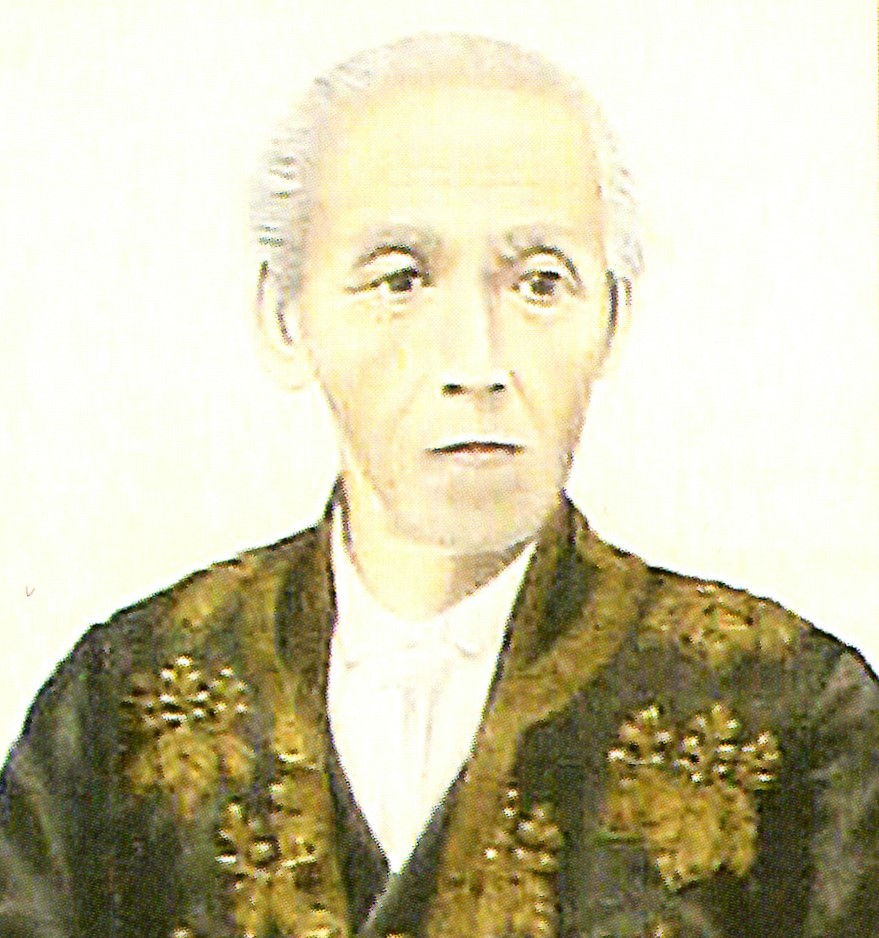
- Tōyama Tomoyoshi, post Meiji restoration

12th Daimyō of Naegi Domain
- In office 1838–1869
- Monarchs: Shōgun: Tokugawa Ieyoshi; Tokugawa Iesada; Tokugawa Iemochi; Tokugawa Yoshinobu
- Preceded by: Tōyama Tomohisa
- Succeeded by: -- none--

Imperial Governor of Naegi
- In office 1869–1870
- Monarch: Emperor Meiji

Personal details
- Born: October 20, 1819
- Died: April 4, 1894 (aged 74) Tokyo, Japan
- Parent: Tōyama Tomohisa (father)

Tōyama Tomoyoshi (遠山友禄; October 20, 1819 – April 4, 1894) was the 12th and final daimyō of Naegi Domain under the Bakumatsu period Tokugawa Shogunate of Japan. His wife was a daughter of Shimazu Tadayuki of Sadowara Domain. His courtesy titles were Buzen-no-kami, Shinano-no-kami and Mino-no-kami, and he was also called Tōyama Tomoaki (遠山友詳).

== Biography ==
Tōyama Tomoyoshi was the third son of the 11th daimyō of Naegi Domain, Tōyama Tomohisa, but both of his elder brothers died young. He was proclaimed heir in 1828 and became daimyō in 1838 on the death of his father. He was appointed to the guard of the Uchisaiwai Gate of Edo Castle, Sumpu kaban and later became a sōshaban. In 1861 he became a wakadoshiyori. The following year, the Namamugi Incident occurred, in which a British merchant was killed by the retinue of Shimazu Hisamitsu near Yokohama. Tōyama Tomoyoshi was assigned to apologize to the British government. Having completed this task, he was relieved of his position as wakadoshiyori, and returned to Naegi. The following year, he was appointed as Osaka kaban, and in 1865 was appointed wakadoshiyori for a second time. It was around this time that he changed his name from "Tomoaki" to "Tomoyoshi". He was assigned by Shogun Tokugawa Iemochi to accompany the abortive Second Chōshū expedition. In 1866, after the sudden death of Tokugawa Iemochi, he was part of the escort that brought his body back to Edo. He resigned as wakadoshiyori in June 1867, and returned to Naegi in February 1868. He soon submitted to the new Meiji government and was asked to dispatch troops to guard Iwakura Tomomi and the imperial army advancing along the Nakasendō through Shinano Province.

He was appointed imperial governor of Naegi in 1869. He ordered all of his samurai to become farmers and spent all of the remaining wealth of the domain in an effort to pay of the domain's debts and to provide relief to his former retainers when the Meiji government decided that it would no longer provide any stipends to the ex-samurai class. Not having an heir, he adopted a son of Oda Nagayasu of Shibamura Domain to succeed the Tōyama family line. In 1870, he also missed an order that all Buddhist temples in Naegi, including the clan's bodaiji of Unrin-ji were to be destroyed, and that only Shinto shrines would be permitted in his domain. The following year, with the abolition of the han system in 1871 he relocated to Tokyo.

He retired in 1875, and spent his remaining years organizing relief efforts for his former samurai. His grave is at the cemetery of the former temple of Unrin-in in Naegi.
