= Outline of Japan =

Overview of and topical guide to Japan

The flag of Japan

The Imperial Seal of Japan

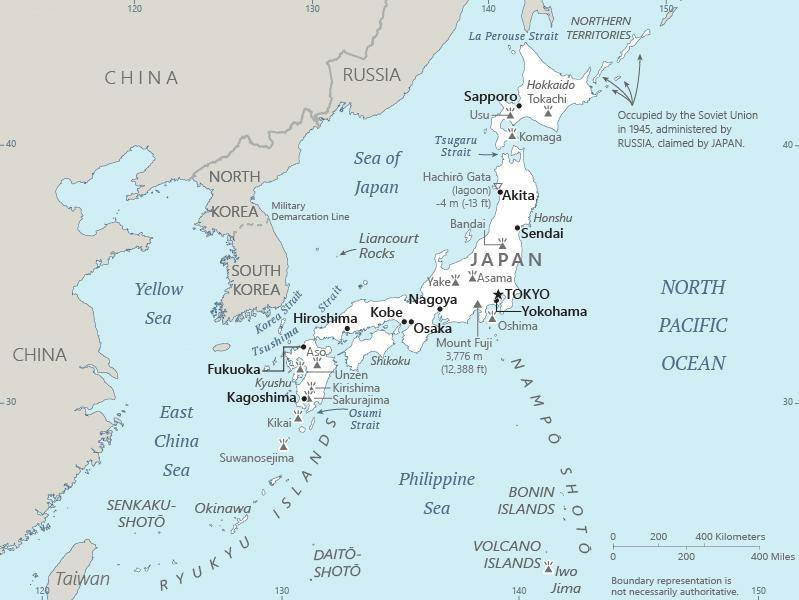
An enlargeable map of Japan

The following outline is provided as an overview of and topical guide to Japan:

Japan – an island nation in East Asia, located in the Pacific Ocean. It lies to the east of the Sea of Japan, China, North Korea, South Korea and Russia, stretching from the Sea of Okhotsk in the north to the East China Sea and Taiwan in the south. The characters that make up Japan's name mean "sun-origin" (because it lies to the east of nearby countries), which is why Japan is sometimes referred to as the "Land of the Rising Sun". Japan is an archipelago of 14,125 islands. The four largest islands are Honshu, Hokkaido, Kyushu, and Shikoku, which together comprise about ninety-seven percent of Japan's land area.

== General reference ==
- Pronunciation: /dʒəˈpæn/
  - Japanese: [ɲihoꜜɴ] or [ɲippoꜜɴ]
- Common endonyms: Nippon, Nihon (日本)
- Official endonym: Nippon-koku (日本国)
- Adjectival: Japanese
- Etymology: Name of Japan
- International rankings of Japan
- ISO country codes: JP, JPN, 392
- ISO region codes: ISO 3166-2:JP
- Internet country code top-level domain: .jp

== Geography of Japan ==
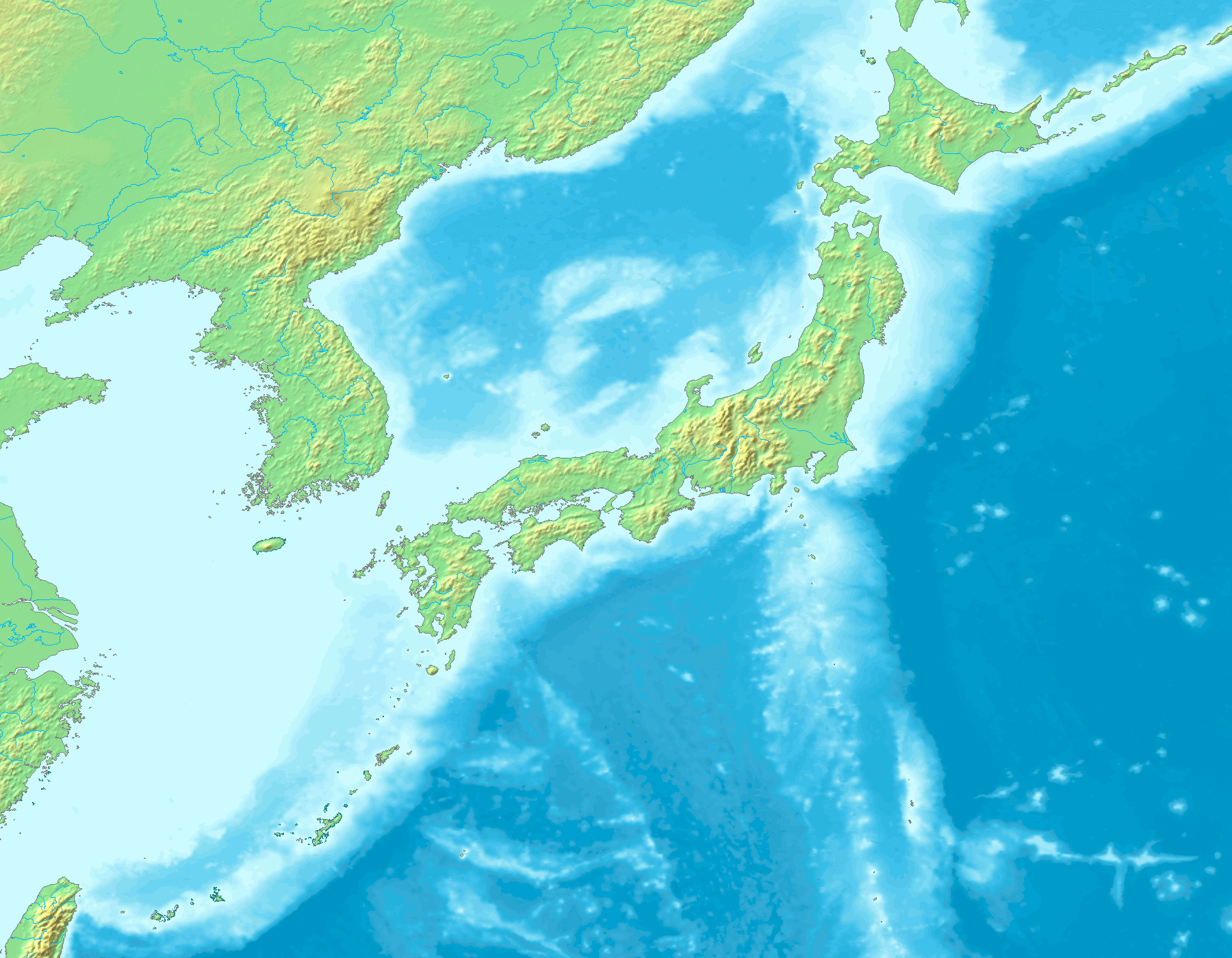
An enlargeable topographic/hydrographic map of Japan

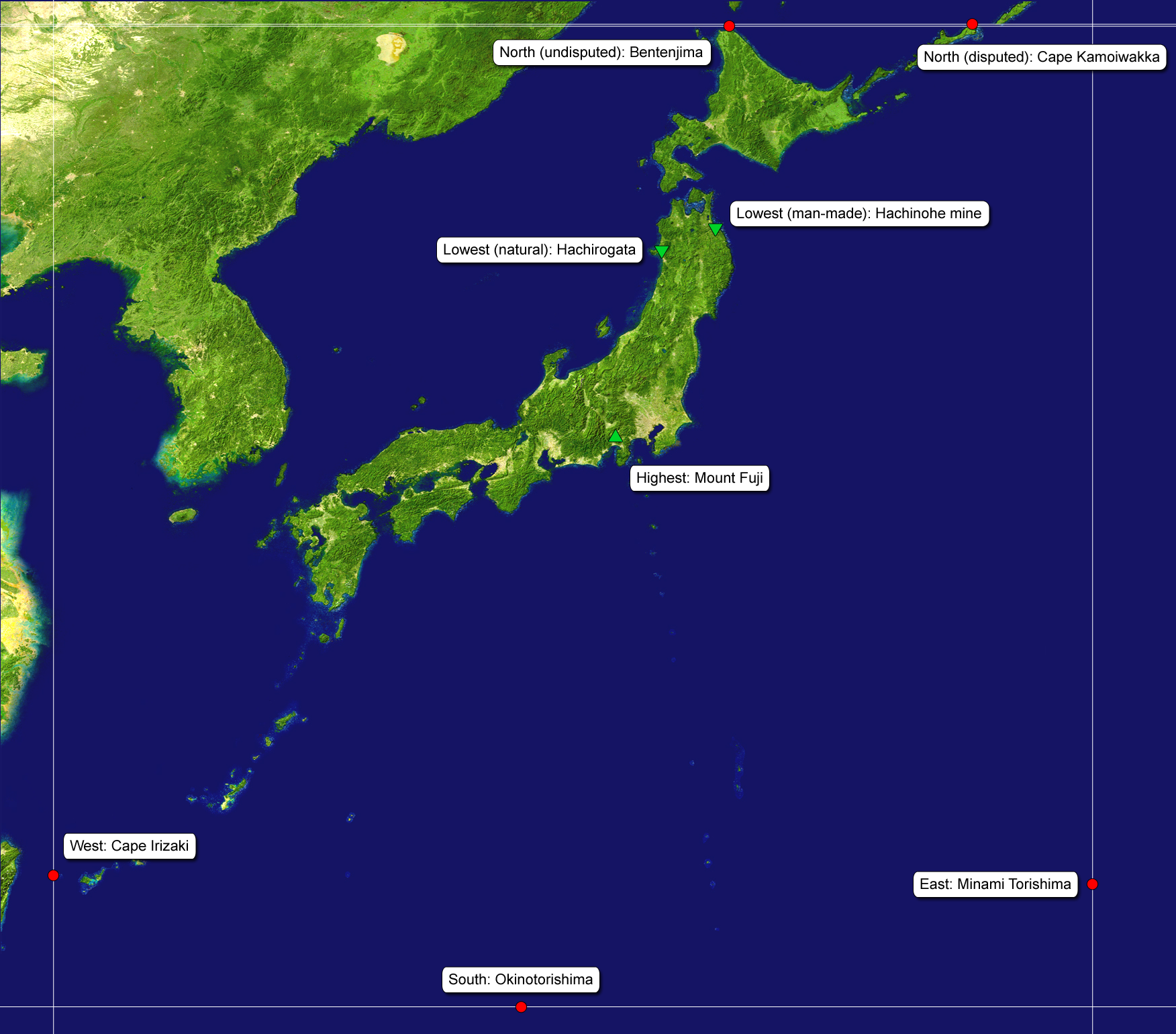
An enlargeable map of the extreme points of Japan

- Japan is: an island country and archipelago of 6,852 islands, shaped like the lowercase letter j.
- Location:
  - Pacific Ocean
  - Northern Hemisphere and Eastern Hemisphere
    - Asia
      - East Asia
  - Time zone: Japan Standard Time (UTC+09)
  - Extreme points of Japan
    - High: Mount Fuji 3,776 m (12,388 ft)
    - Low: Hachirōgata −4 m (−13 ft)
  - Land boundaries: none
  - Coastline: 29,751 km (18,486 mi)
- Population of Japan: 125,950,000 people - 11th most populous country
- Area of Japan: 377,873 km^{2} (145,898 sq mi) - 62nd largest country
- Atlas of Japan
- Addressing system in Japan
- Historic provinces of Japan
- Japan Standard Time

=== Environment of Japan ===
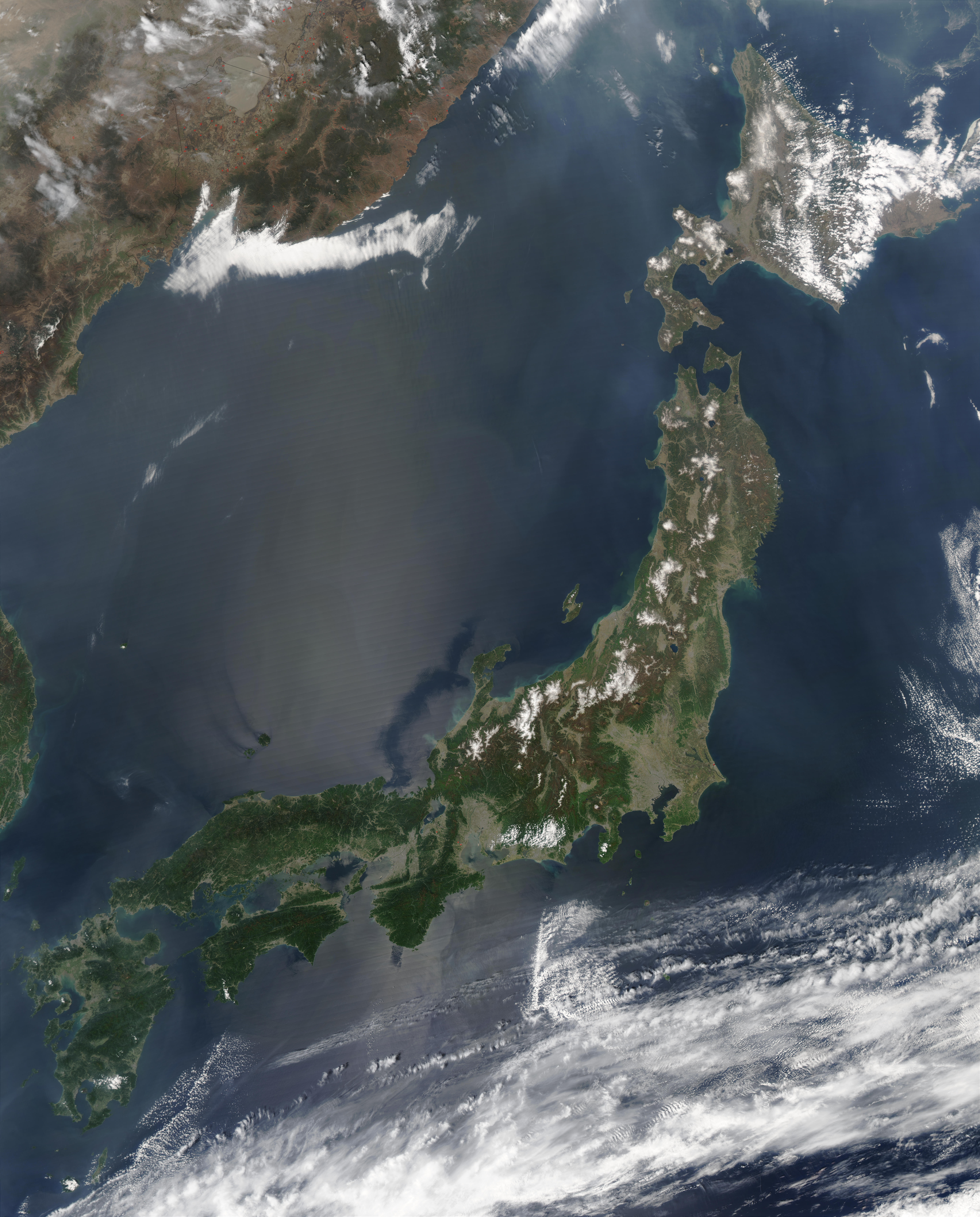
An enlargeable satellite image of Japan

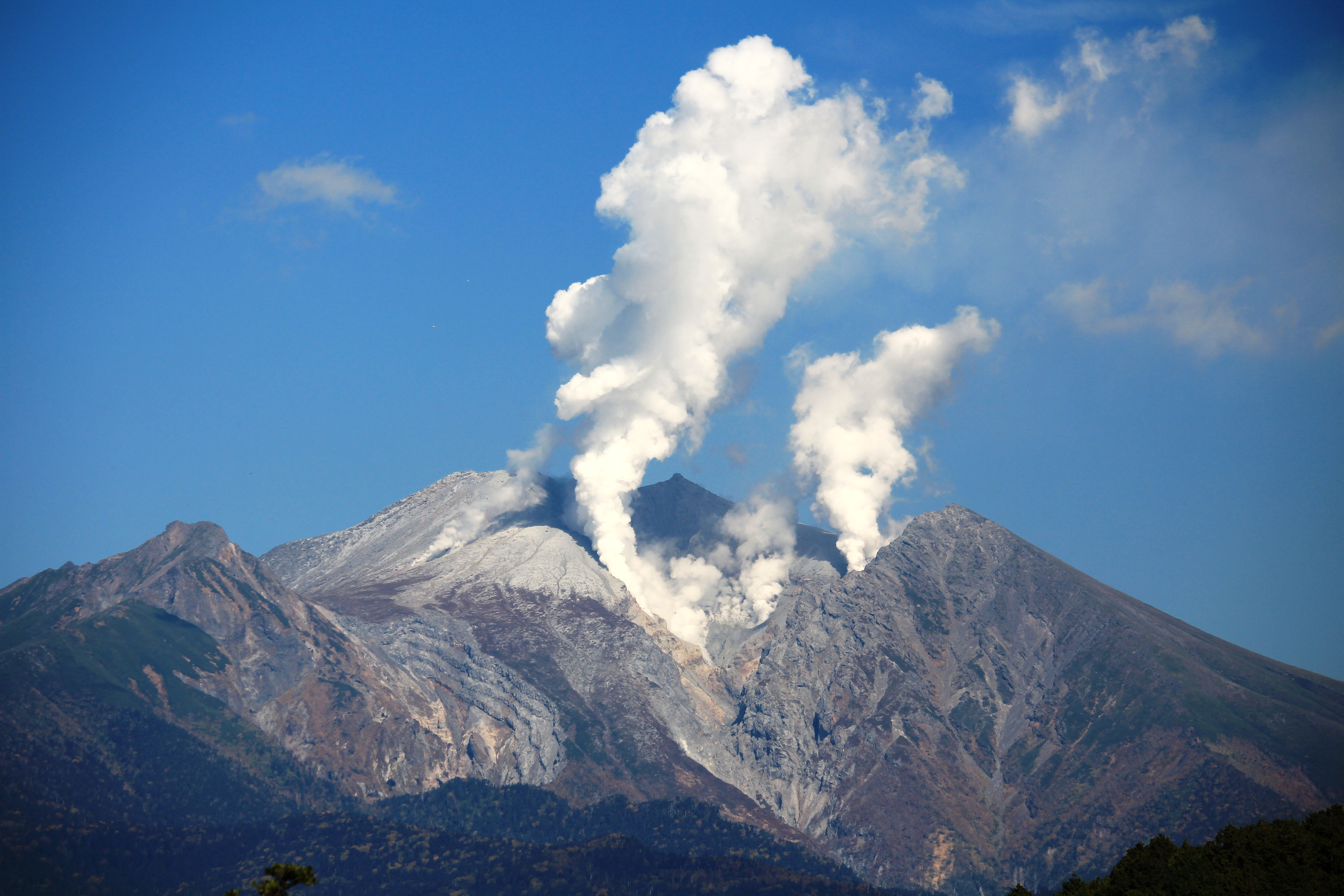
Mount Ontake seen from Kurakake Pass

- Climate of Japan
  - Climate change in Japan
- Environmental issues in Japan
- Ecoregions in Japan
- Energy in Japan
- Geology of Japan
- National parks of Japan
- Tsunami
- Wildlife of Japan
  - Flora of Japan
  - Fauna of Japan
    - Birds of Japan
    - Mammals of Japan

==== Geographic features of Japan ====
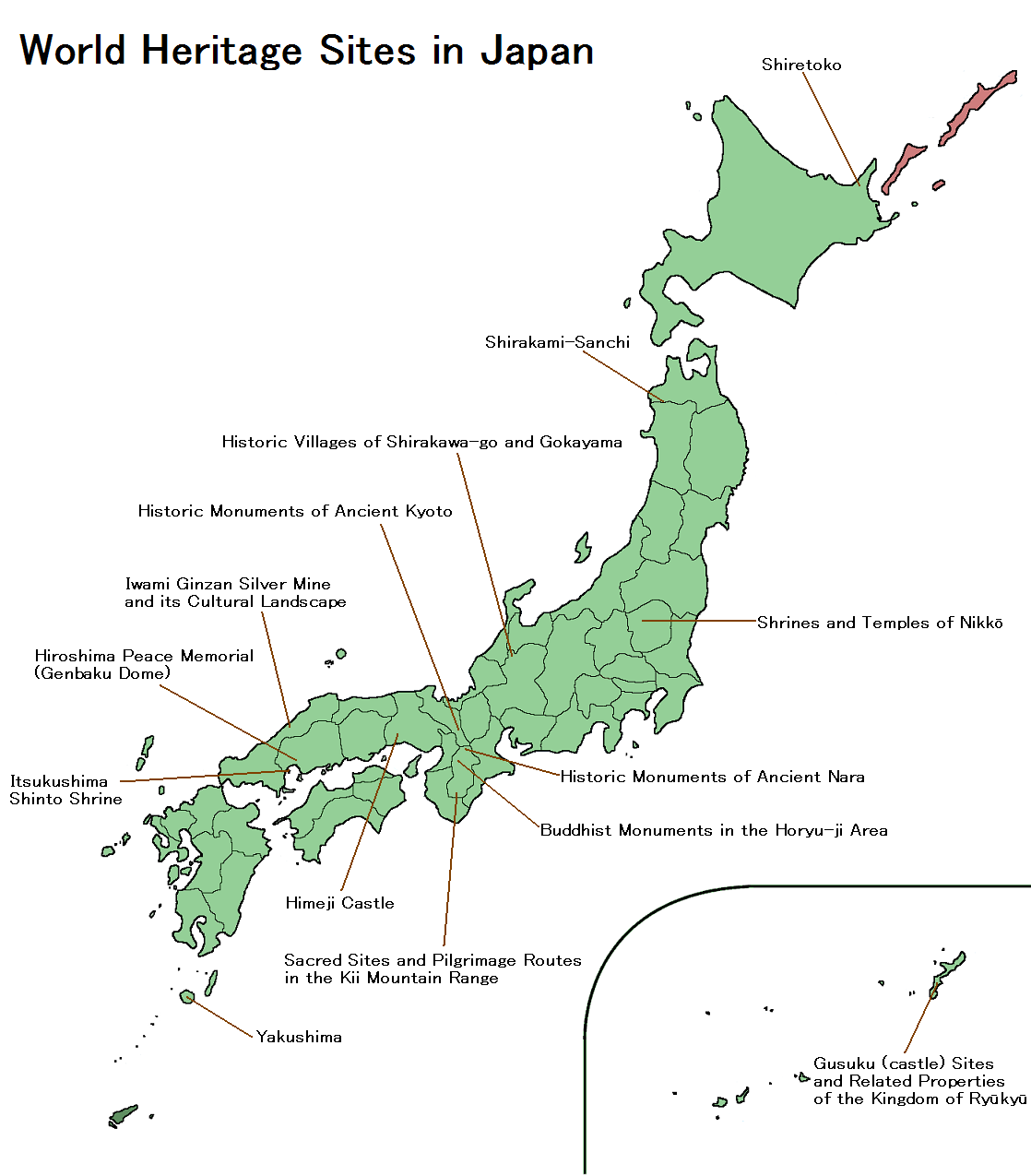
An enlargeable map of the World Heritage Sites of Japan

- Glaciers of Japan
- Islands of Japan
- Lakes of Japan
- Mountains of Japan
  - Volcanoes in Japan
- Rivers of Japan
  - Waterfalls of Japan
- Three Views of Japan
- List of World Heritage Sites in Japan

=== Regions of Japan ===
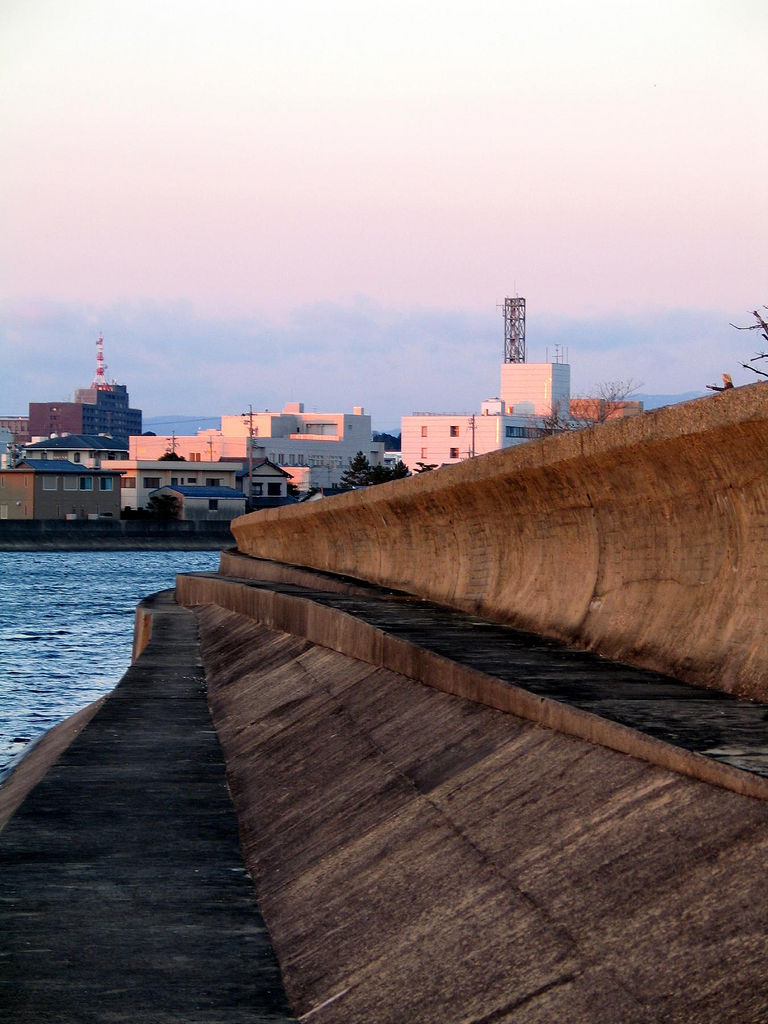
Tsunami wall at Tsu, Mie

The four main islands of Japan are:

- Hokkaido
- Honshu
- Kyushu
- Shikoku

Major regions of Japan include:

- Hokkaido (the island of Hokkaido and nearby islands, largest city Sapporo)
- Tōhoku region (northern Honshu, largest city Sendai)
- Kantō region (eastern Honshu, largest cities Tokyo and Yokohama)
  - Nanpō Islands: part of Tokyo Metropolis
- Chūbu region (central Honshu, including Mount Fuji), sometimes divided into:
  - Hokuriku region (northwestern Chūbu)
  - Kōshin'etsu region (northeastern Chūbu, largest city Nagano)
  - Tōkai region (southern Chūbu, largest city Nagoya, Hamamatsu, and Shizuoka)
- Kansai or Kinki region (west-central Honshu, largest cities Osaka, Kobe, and Kyoto)
- Chūgoku region (western Honshu, largest city Hiroshima, and Okayama)
- Shikoku (island, largest city Matsuyama, and Takamatsu)
- Kyushu (island, largest city Fukuoka) which includes:
  - Ryukyu Islands, including Okinawa

==== Administrative divisions of Japan ====
- Administrative division types
  - Regions of Japan (unofficial)
    - Prefectures of Japan
      - Subprefectures of Japan
        - Districts of Japan
          - Municipalities of Japan
            - Wards of Japan

===== Prefectures of Japan =====
Map of the prefectures of Japan in ISO 3166-2:JP order and the regions of Japan

From north to south (numbering in ISO 3166-2:JP order), the prefectures of Japan and their commonly associated regions are:

| Hokkaido: 1. Hokkaido; Tōhoku: 2. Aomori; 3. Iwate; 4. Miyagi; 5. Akita; 6. Yamagata; 7. Fukushima; Kantō: 8. Ibaraki; 9. Tochigi; 10. Gunma; 11. Saitama; 12. Chiba; 13. Tokyo; 14. Kanagawa | Chūbu: 15. Niigata; 16. Toyama; 17. Ishikawa; 18. Fukui; 19. Yamanashi; 20. Nagano; 21. Gifu; 22. Shizuoka; 23. Aichi; Kansai: 24. Mie; 25. Shiga; 26. Kyoto; 27. Osaka; 28. Hyōgo; 29. Nara; 30. Wakayama | Chūgoku: 31. Tottori; 32. Shimane; 33. Okayama; 34. Hiroshima; 35. Yamaguchi; Shikoku: 36. Tokushima; 37. Kagawa; 38. Ehime; 39. Kōchi; Kyushu and Okinawa: 40. Fukuoka; 41. Saga; 42. Nagasaki; 43. Kumamoto; 44. Ōita; 45. Miyazaki; 46. Kagoshima; 47. Okinawa |

Karafuto, a portion of the island of Sakhalin north of Hokkaido (not shown on the map), was part of Japan from 1907 until World War II. The entire island is now governed by Russia.

===== Municipalities of Japan =====
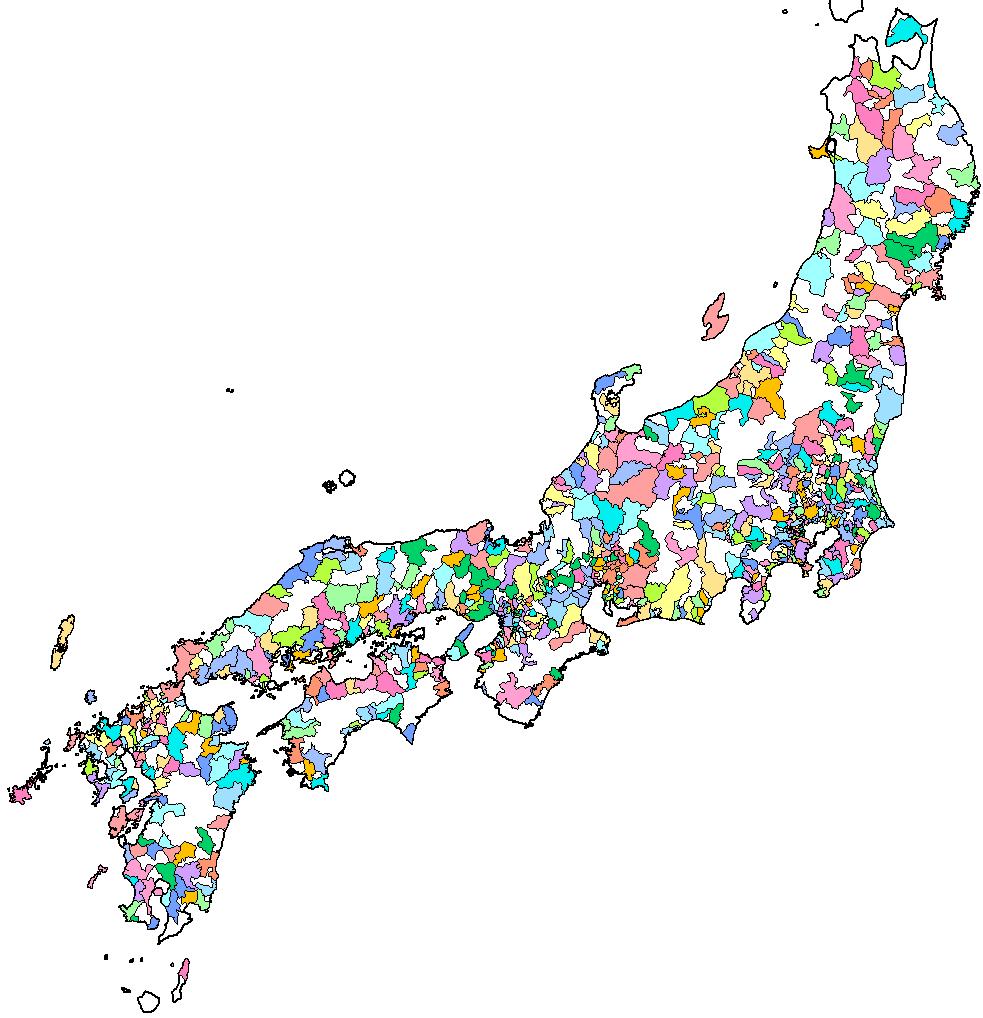
Cities of Japan

- Cities of Japan
  - Capital of Japan: Tokyo
  - Cities designated by government ordinance
  - Cities, by population
- Towns of Japan
- Villages of Japan

=== Demography of Japan ===
- Aging of Japan

== Government and politics of Japan ==
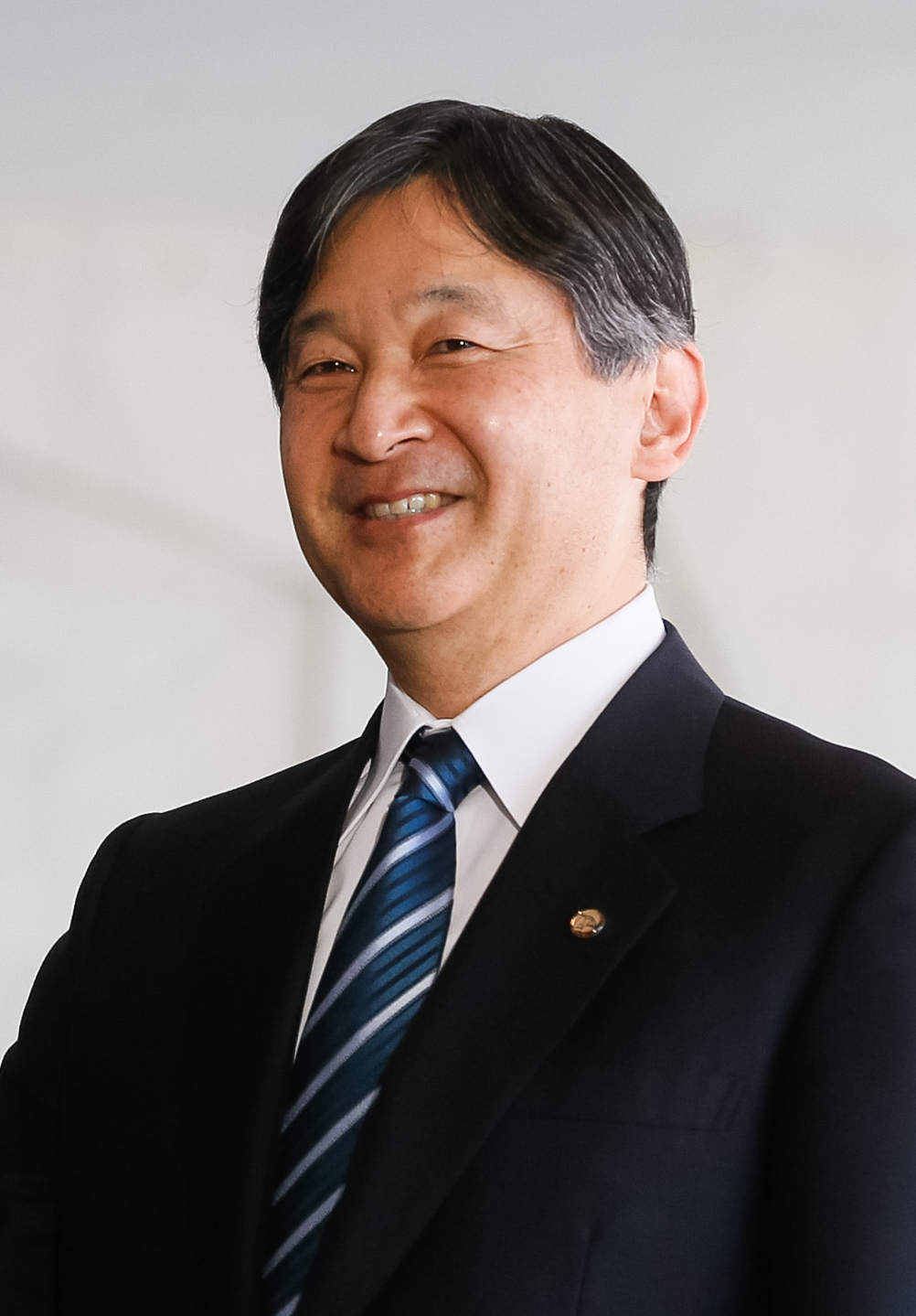
Naruhito, 126th Emperor of Japan

- Form of government: parliamentary multi-party representative democratic constitutional monarchy
- Capital of Japan: Tokyo
- Elections in Japan
- Imperial House of Japan (Imperial family)
  - Imperial Guard of Japan
  - Imperial Household Law
  - Imperial Household Agency
- Civil service of Japan
- Japanese public corporations
- Independent administrative institutions of Japan
- Political parties in Japan
- Government-business relations in Japan
- Human rights in Japan
- Mass media and politics in Japan
- Monetary and fiscal policy of Japan
- Political funding in Japan
- Political extremism in Japan
- Taxation in Japan
- Health care system in Japan
- Social welfare in Japan

=== Branches of the government of Japan ===
==== Executive branch of the government of Japan ====
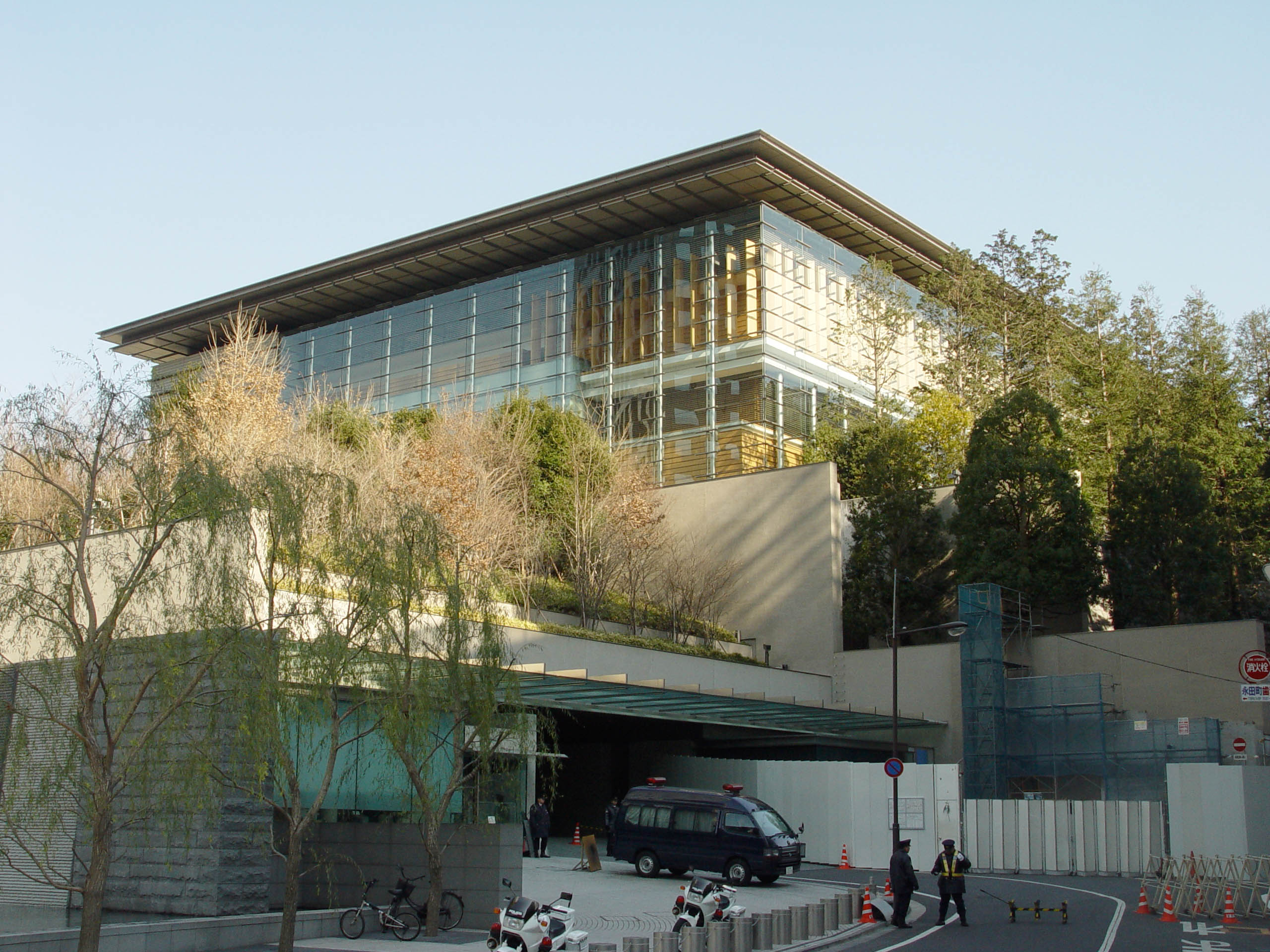
Present-day Kantei, office and residence of the Prime Minister

- Symbol of state: Naruhito, Emperor of Japan (Note: The Emperor has no executive authority, but is treated as a head of state under diplomatic protocol)
  - Controversies regarding the role of the Emperor of Japan
  - Emperors of the past
- Head of state: de facto head of state of Japan is the head of government, the Prime Minister (see below)
- Head of government: Sanae Takaichi, Prime Minister of Japan
  - Kantei (Office and residence of the Prime Minister)
  - Prime Ministers of the past
- Cabinet of Japan
- Ministries of Japan
  - National Public Safety Commission
  - Ministry of Internal Affairs and Communications
  - Ministry of Justice
  - Ministry of Foreign Affairs
  - Ministry of Finance (Japan)
  - Ministry of Education, Culture, Sports, Science and Technology
  - Ministry of Health, Labour and Welfare
  - Ministry of Agriculture, Forestry and Fisheries
  - Ministry of Economy, Trade and Industry
  - Ministry of Land, Infrastructure and Transport
  - Ministry of the Environment
  - Ministry of Defence

==== Legislative branch of the government of Japan ====
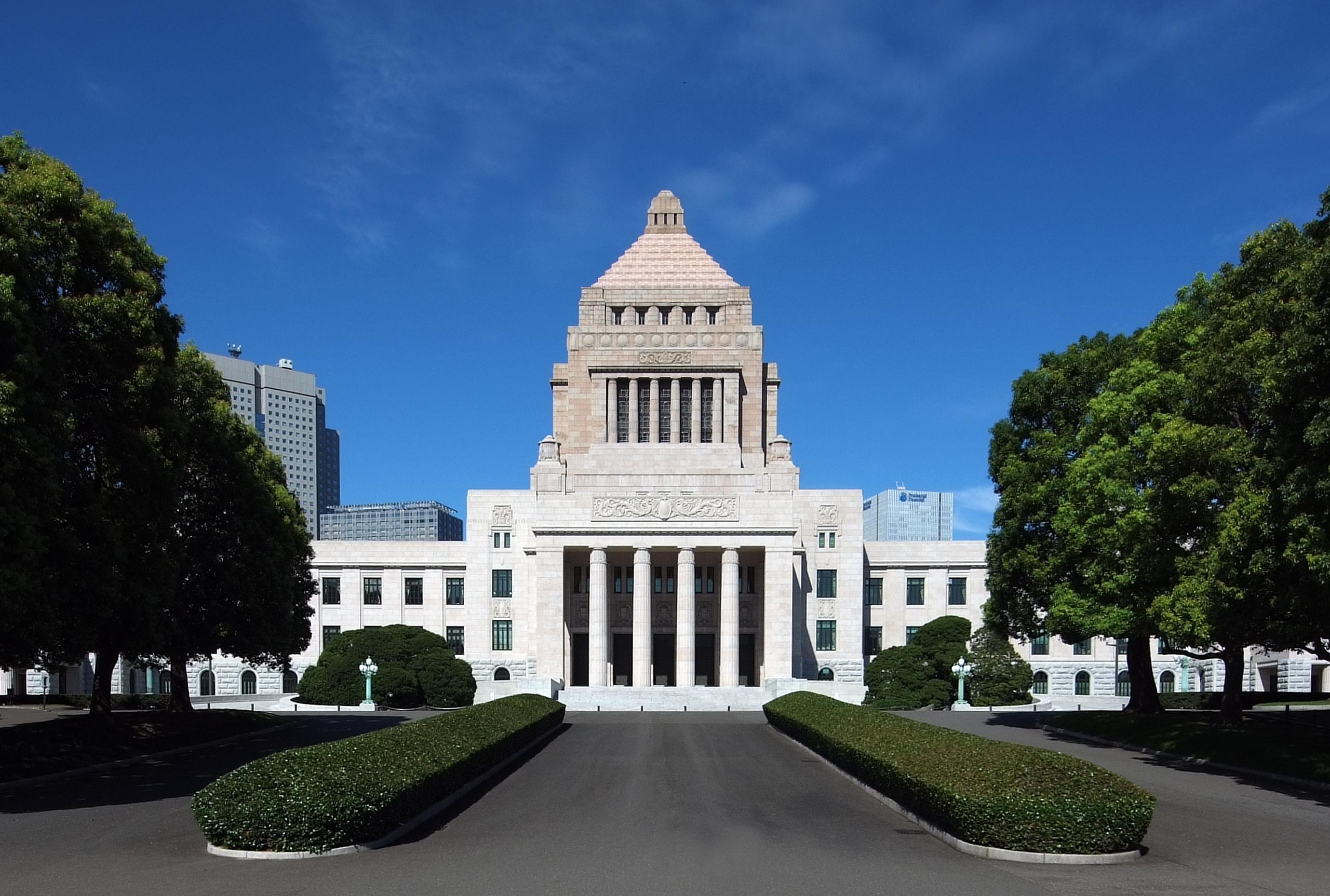
National Diet Building

- Diet of Japan (bicameral legislature of Japan)
  - House of Councillors
  - House of Representatives of Japan
- National Diet Building

==== Judicial branch of the government of Japan ====
- Judicial system of Japan
- Supreme Court of Japan

=== Foreign relations of Japan ===
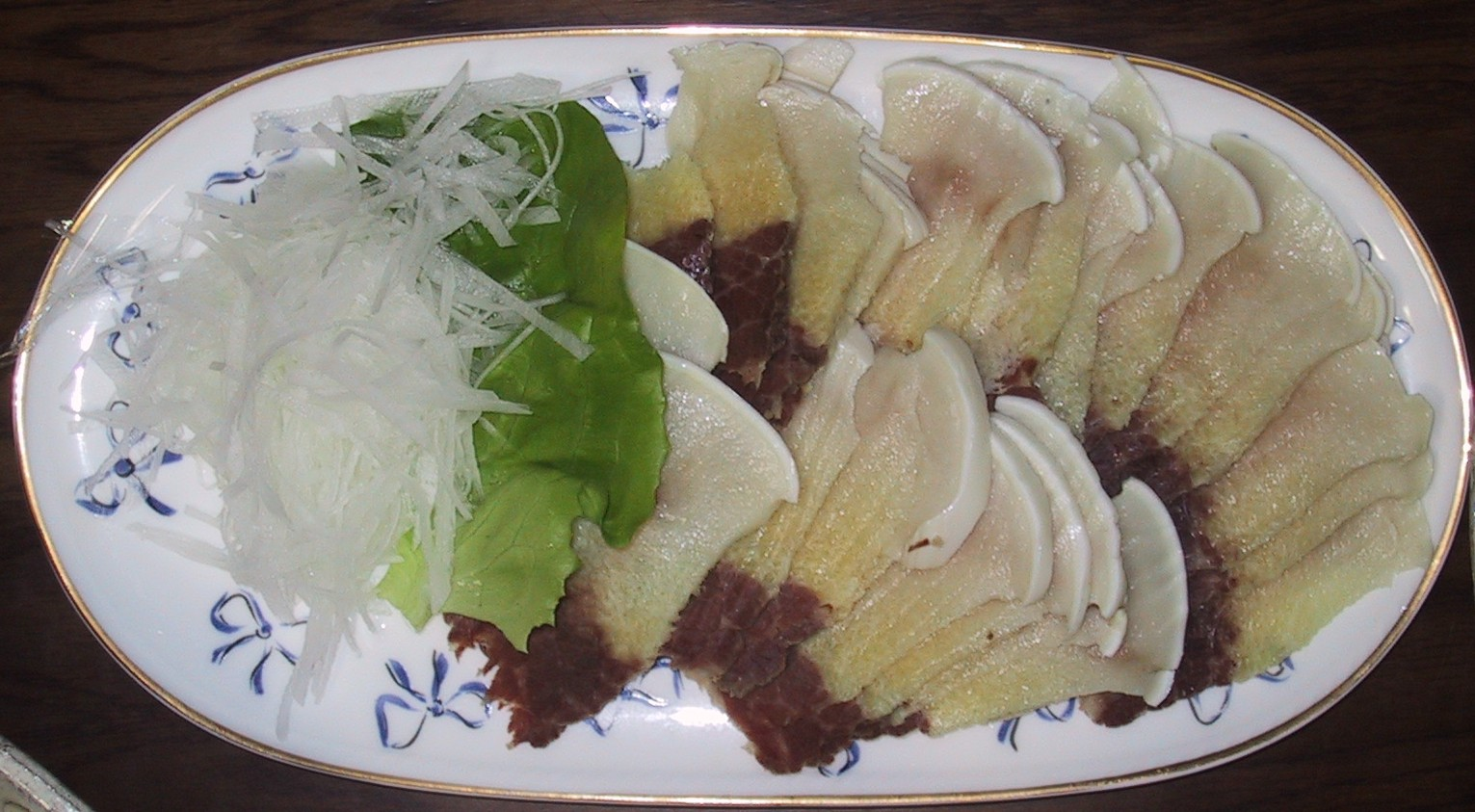
Dish of whale meat

- Diplomatic missions of Japan
- Foreign aid institutions of Japan
- Foreign policy of Japan
- Japan's non-nuclear weapons policy
- Whaling in Japan

==== International organization membership of Japan ====
Japan is a member of:

- African Development Bank (AfDB) (non-regional member)
- Asian Development Bank (ADB)
- Asia-Pacific Economic Cooperation (APEC)
- Asia-Pacific Telecommunity (APT)
- Association of Southeast Asian Nations (ASEAN) (dialogue partner)
- Association of Southeast Asian Nations Regional Forum (ARF)
- Australia Group
- Bank for International Settlements (BIS)
- Colombo Plan (CP)
- Council of Europe (CE) (observer)
- East Asia Summit (EAS)
- European Bank for Reconstruction and Development (EBRD)
- Energy Charter
- European Organization for Nuclear Research (CERN) (observer)
- Food and Agriculture Organization (FAO)
- Group of Five (G5)
- Group of Seven (G7)
- Group of Eight (G8)
- Group of Ten (G10)
- Group of Twenty (G20)
- Inter-American Development Bank (IADB)
- International Atomic Energy Agency (IAEA)
- International Bank for Reconstruction and Development (IBRD)
- International Chamber of Commerce (ICC)
- International Civil Aviation Organization (ICAO)
- International Criminal Court (ICCt)
- International Criminal Police Organization (Interpol)
- International Development Association (IDA)
- International Energy Agency (IEA)
- International Energy Charter
- International Federation of Red Cross and Red Crescent Societies (IFRCS)
- International Finance Corporation (IFC)
- International Fund for Agricultural Development (IFAD)
- International Hydrographic Organization (IHO)
- International Labour Organization (ILO)
- International Maritime Organization (IMO)
- International Mobile Satellite Organization (IMSO)
- International Monetary Fund (IMF)
- International Olympic Committee (IOC)
- International Organization for Migration (IOM)
- International Organization for Standardization (ISO)
- International Red Cross and Red Crescent Movement (ICRM)
- International Telecommunication Union (ITU)
- International Telecommunications Satellite Organization (ITSO)
- International Trade Union Confederation (ITUC)
- Inter-Parliamentary Union (IPU)
- Latin American Integration Association (LAIA)
- Multilateral Investment Guarantee Agency (MIGA)
- Nuclear Energy Agency (NEA)
- Nuclear Suppliers Group (NSG)
- Organisation for Economic Co-operation and Development (OECD)
- Organization for Security and Cooperation in Europe (OSCE) (partner)
- Organisation for the Prohibition of Chemical Weapons (OPCW)
- Organization of American States (OAS) (observer)
- Pacific Islands Forum (PIF) (partner)
- Paris Club
- Permanent Court of Arbitration (PCA)
- South Asian Association for Regional Cooperation (SAARC) (observer)
- Southeast European Cooperative Initiative (SECI) (observer)
- United Nations (UN)
- United Nations Conference on Trade and Development (UNCTAD)
- United Nations Disengagement Observer Force (UNDOF)
- United Nations Educational, Scientific, and Cultural Organization (UNESCO)
- United Nations High Commissioner for Refugees (UNHCR)
- United Nations Industrial Development Organization (UNIDO)
- United Nations Institute for Training and Research (UNITAR)
- United Nations Relief and Works Agency for Palestine Refugees in the Near East (UNRWA)
- Universal Postal Union (UPU)
- World Confederation of Labour (WCL)
- World Customs Organization (WCO)
- World Federation of Trade Unions (WFTU)
- World Health Organization (WHO)
- World Intellectual Property Organization (WIPO)
- World Meteorological Organization (WMO)
- World Tourism Organization (UNWTO)
- World Trade Organization (WTO)
- World Veterans Federation
- Zangger Committee (ZC)

=== Law and order of Japan ===
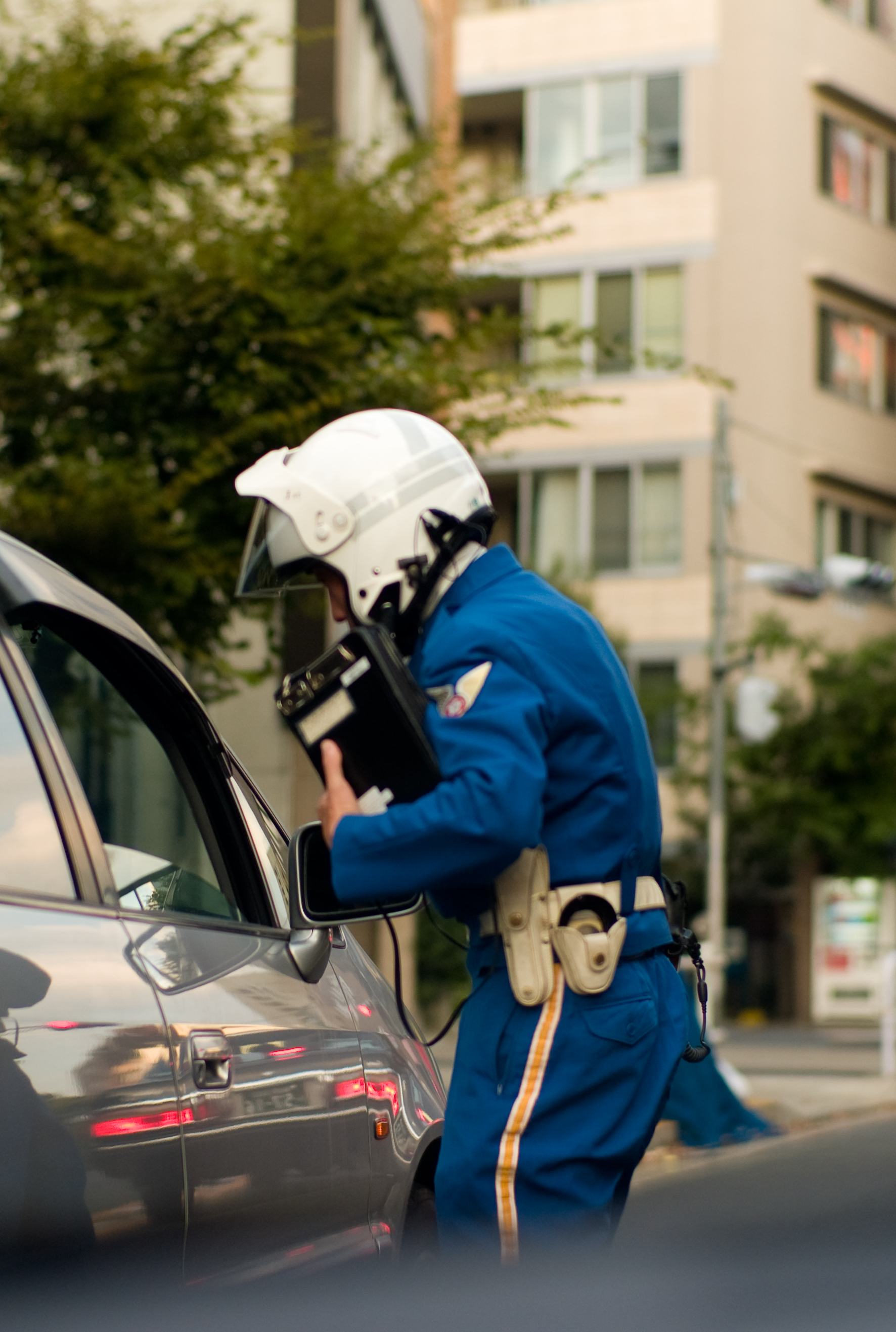
Motorcycle policeman questioning driver

- Attorneys in Japan
- Capital punishment in Japan
- Civil Code of Japan
- Constitution of Japan
- Criminal justice system of Japan
- Crime in Japan
  - Cannabis in Japan
- Juries in Japan
  - Organized crime in Japan
- Human rights in Japan
  - Freedom of the press in Japan
  - Freedom of religion in Japan
  - LGBT rights in Japan
- Law enforcement in Japan
- Penal system of Japan
- Public order and internal security in Japan

=== Military of Japan ===
- Japan's non-nuclear policy
- Japan Self-Defense Forces
  - Army of Japan: Japan Ground Self-Defense Force
  - Navy of Japan: Japan Maritime Self-Defense Force
  - Air force Japan: Japan Air Self-Defense Force
- Military history of Japan
- National security of Japan

== History of Japan ==
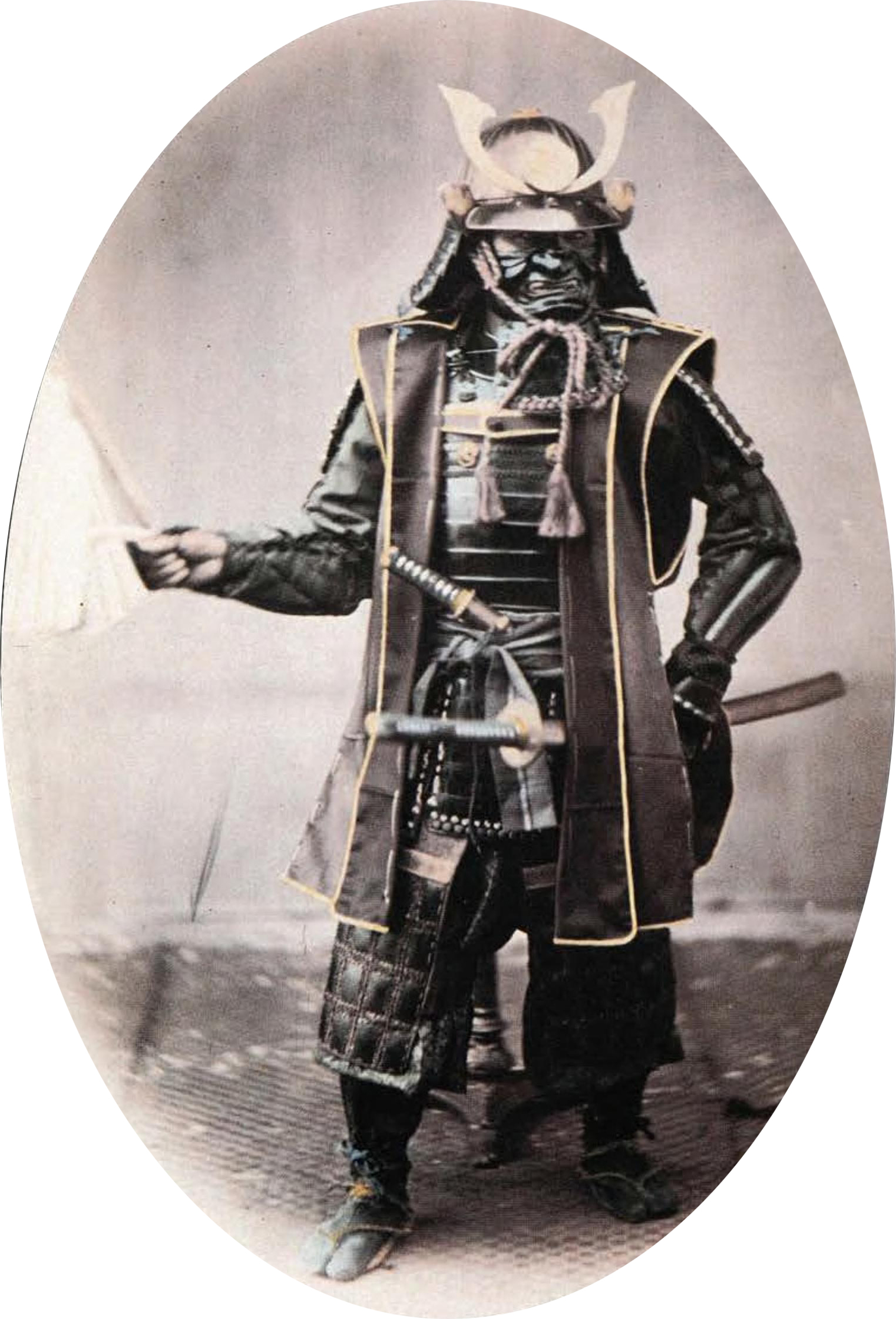
Japanese bushi in armour

- History of Japan by year
- History of Tokyo
- Japanese nationalism
- Military history of Japan
  - Samurai
  - Shōgun
  - Ninja
  - Japanese militarism
  - Pacific Ocean theater of World War II
    - Attack on Pearl Harbor
    - Kamikaze
    - Atomic bombings of Hiroshima and Nagasaki
    - Surrender of Japan
    - Aftermath of World War II: Occupation of Japan
  - Naval history

=== History of Japan by period ===
- Paleolithic
- Jōmon period
- Yayoi period
- Yamato period (Note: While the Yamato period (250–710 CE) is considered to include both the Kofun and Asuka periods, as it spans both an archaeological period (Kofun) and a historical period (Asuka), it is held by many to be an outdated period of division in Japan's history, and no longer applicable in discussions of period division.)
  - Kofun period
  - Asuka period
- Nara period
- Heian period
- Kamakura period
  - Mongol invasions of Japan
  - Kenmu Restoration
- Muromachi period
  - Nanboku-chō period
  - Sengoku period
- Azuchi–Momoyama period
  - Nanban trade
- Edo period
  - Genroku period
    - Genroku culture
  - Bakumatsu
- Meiji period
  - Meiji Restoration
    - Empire of Japan
- Taishō period
  - Japanese expansion (1941–42)
  - Japan during World War I
- Shōwa period
  - Japanese militarism
  - Occupation of Japan
  - Post-occupation Japan
- Heisei period
- Reiwa era

== Culture of Japan ==
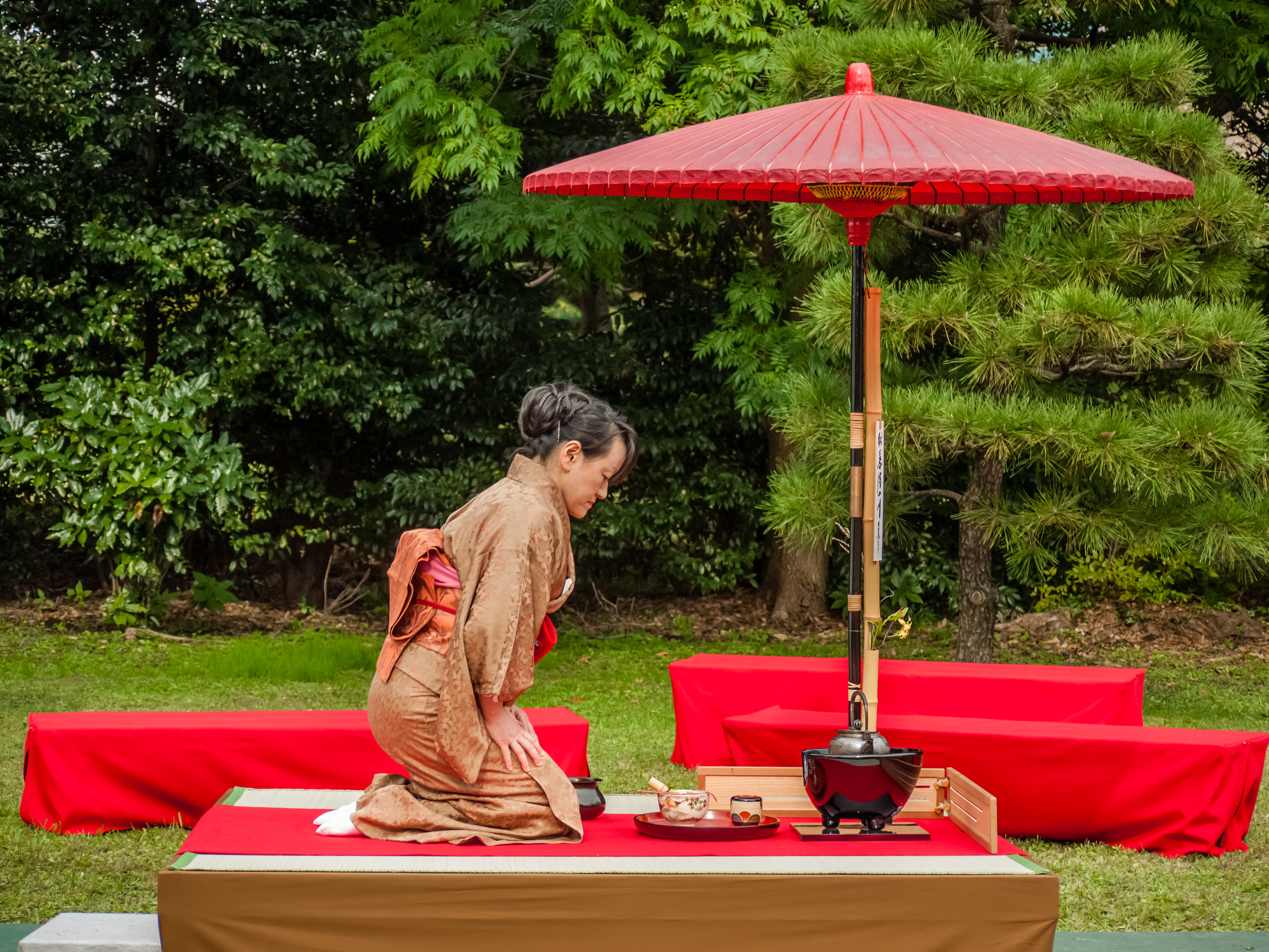
Japanese tea ceremony

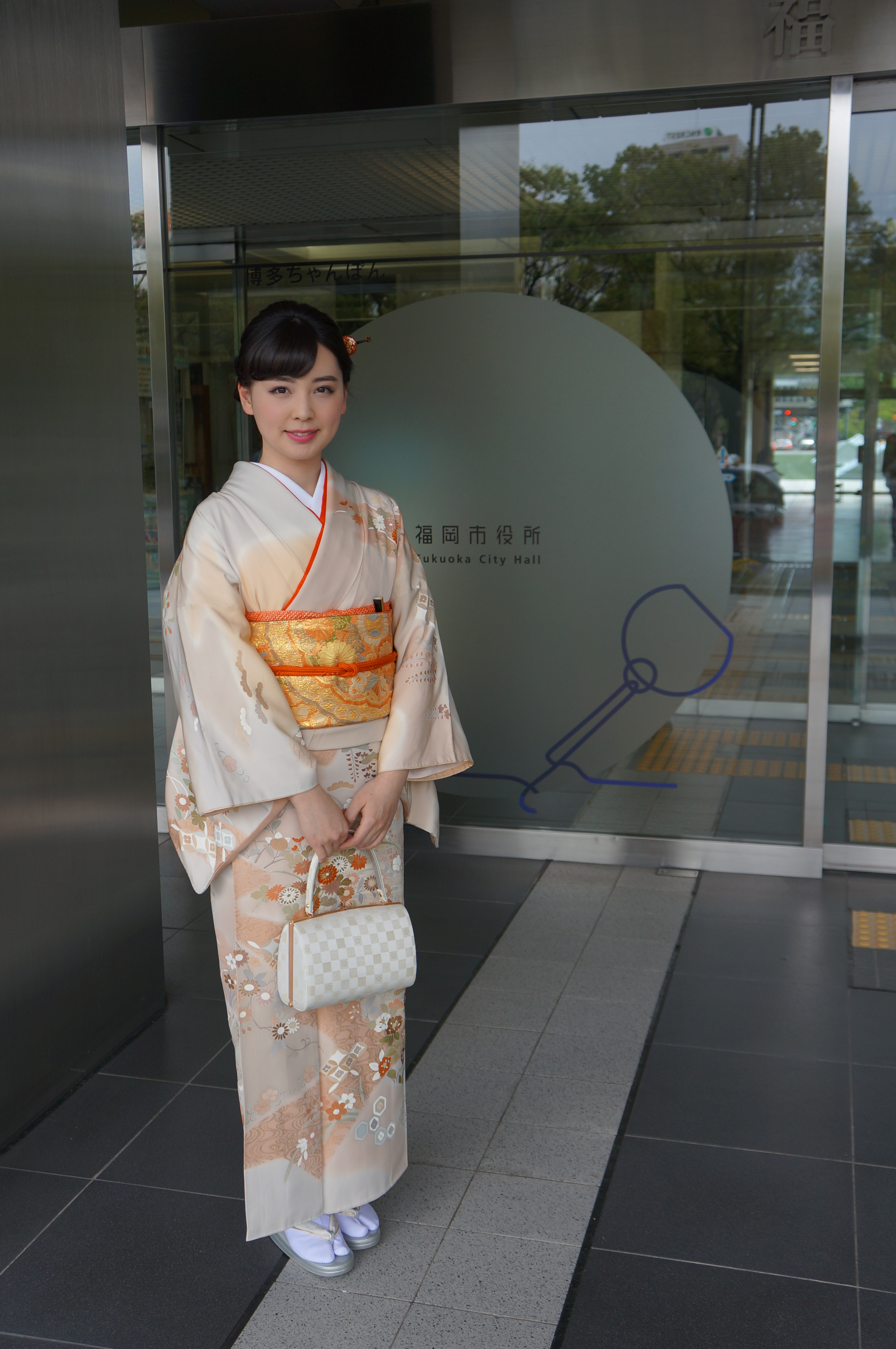
Woman in kimono at Fukuoka City Hall

- Cultural Properties of Japan
- Japanese aesthetics
- Japanese calendar
- Etiquette in Japan
  - Japanese tea ceremony
- Funerals in Japan
- Gambling in Japan
- Japanese martial arts
- Media of Japan
- Japanese museums
  - List of museums in Japan
- Television in Japan
- Pornography in Japan
- Japanese mobile phone culture
- Japanese philosophy
- National symbols of Japan
  - Imperial Regalia of Japan
  - Imperial Seal of Japan
  - Flag of Japan
  - Kimigayo (National anthem of Japan)
- National Treasures of Japan
- Public bathing
  - Onsen
  - Sentō
- Popular culture in Japan
  - Cuteness in Japanese culture
- Prostitution in Japan
- Records of Japan
- Japanese values
- Westernization
  - Americanization
- World Heritage Sites in Japan

=== Architecture of Japan ===
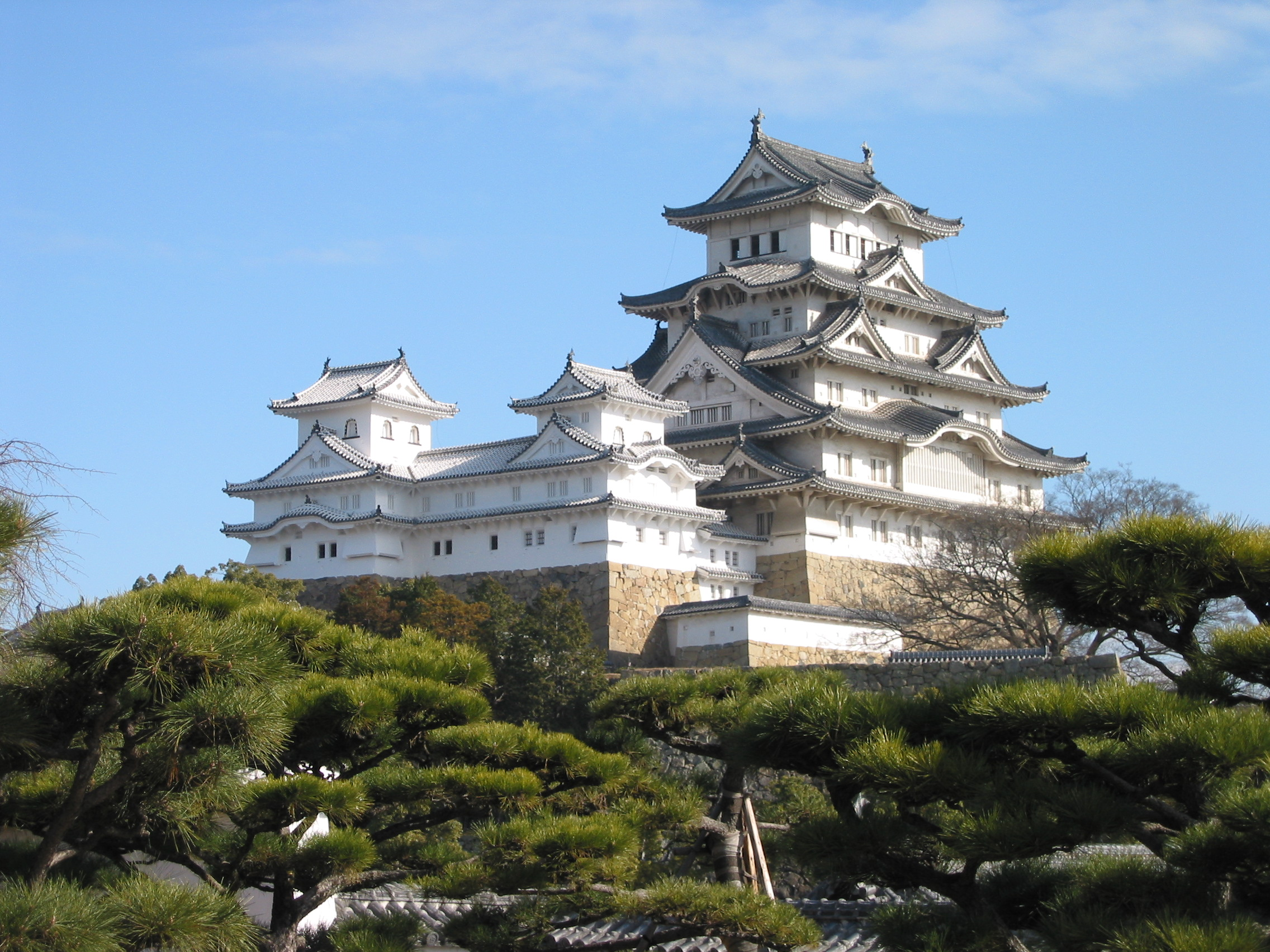
Himeji Castle (UNESCO World Heritage Site)

- Japanese Buddhist architecture
  - Buddhist temples in Japan
    - Hōryū-ji
    - Tōdai-ji
    - Enryaku-ji
    - Mount Kōya
- Castles in Japan
  - Himeji Castle
  - Matsumoto Castle
  - Osaka Castle
- Housing in Japan
- Okinawan architecture
- Shinto shrine
  - Izumo-taisha
  - Usa Shrine

=== Art of Japan ===
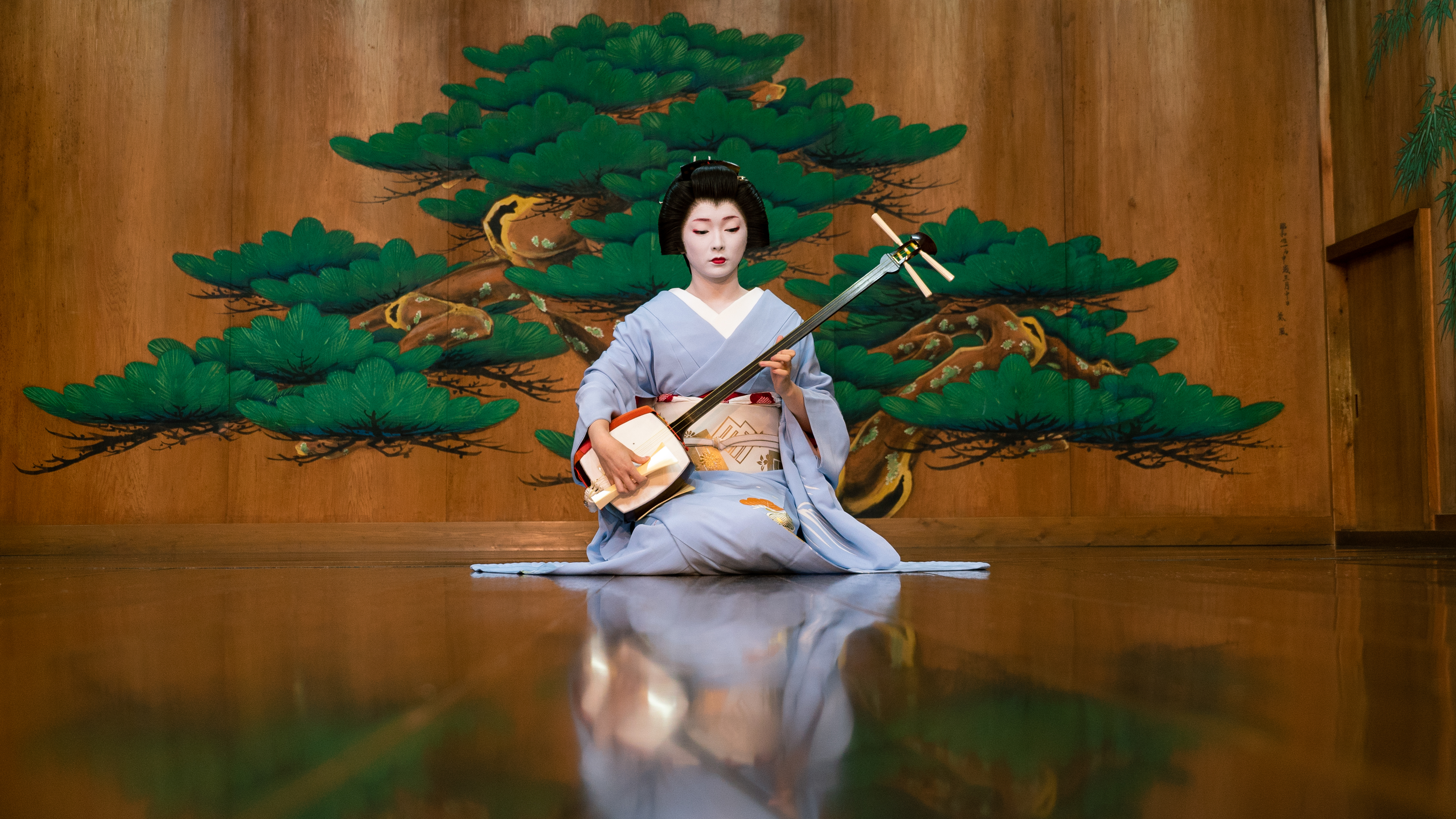
Kyoto geiko playing shamisen

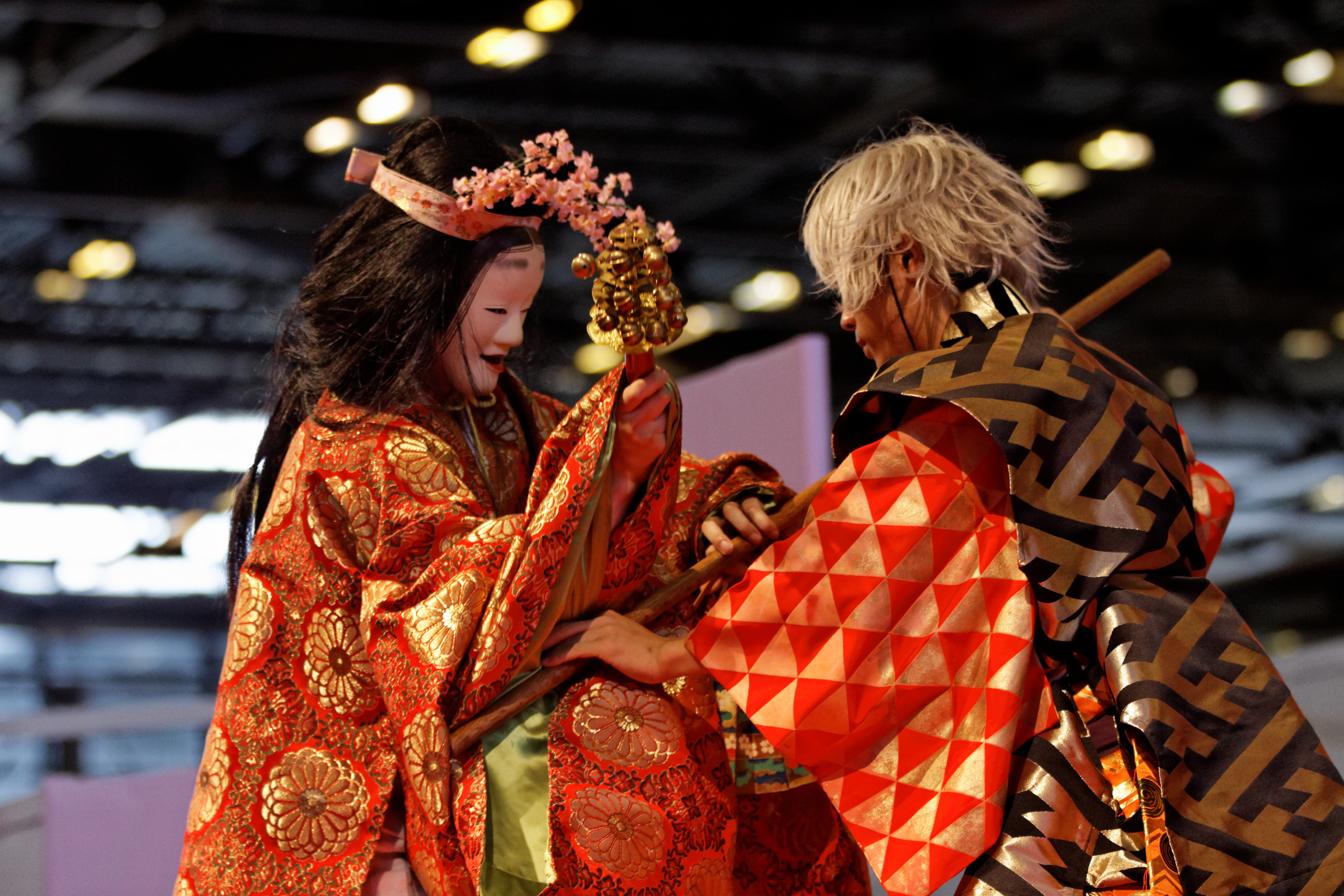
Bugaku theatre

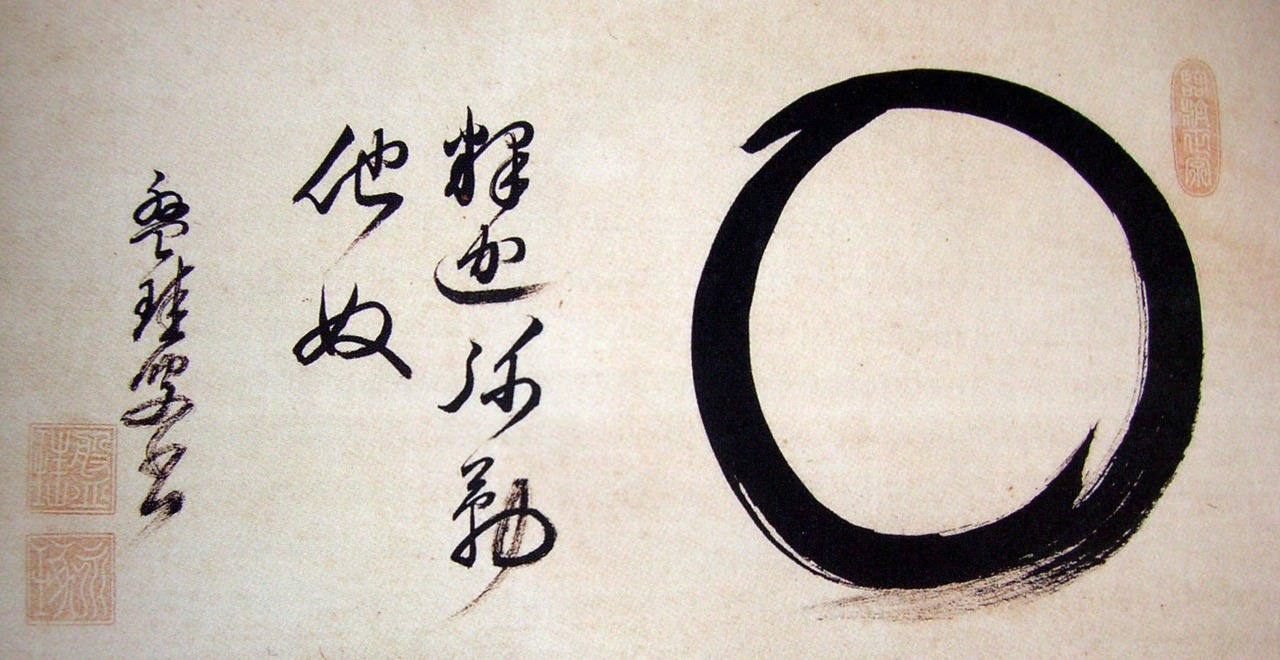
Bankei Yōtaku calligraphy

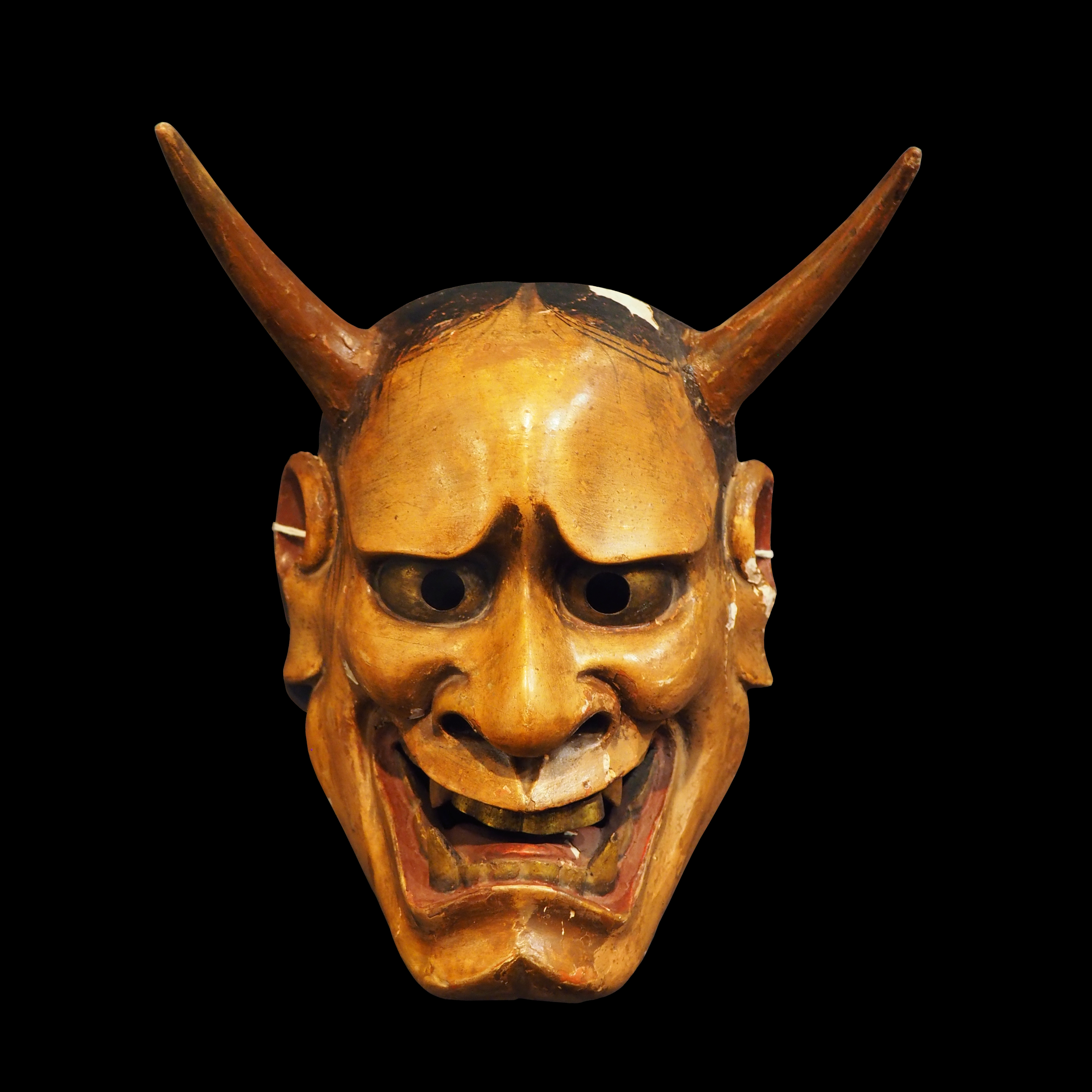
Noh mask, Bern Historical Museum

- Music of Japan
  - Shamisen
  - Taiko
  - Gagaku
  - Koto
  - Enka
  - J-pop
  - Karaoke
- Japanese traditional dance
  - Bugaku
  - Kagura
  - Nihon-buyō
- Calligraphy
  - Dogū
  - Dōtaku
  - Haniwa
  - Japonisme
  - Kagami
  - Kakemono
  - Kanō school
  - Magatama
  - Manga
  - Origami
  - Imari porcelain
  - Pottery
  - Traditional Pottery
  - Ukiyo-e
  - Yamato-e
- Cinema of Japan
  - Anime
    - Studio Ghibli
  - Directors
    - Shōhei Imamura
    - Takeshi Kitano
    - Hirokazu Koreeda
    - Akira Kurosawa
    - Takashi Miike
    - Hayao Miyazaki
    - Kenji Mizoguchi
    - Mikio Naruse
    - Nagisa Oshima
    - Yasujirō Ozu
    - Isao Takahata
  - Films
    - Godzilla
    - In the Realm of the Senses
    - Kagemusha
    - Rashōmon
    - Ring
    - Seven Samurai
- Japanese literature
  - Japanese writers
  - Kojiki
  - Nihon Shoki
  - The Tale of Genji
  - Japanese literary genres
    - Monogatari
    - Haiku
    - Waka
- Theatre in Japan
  - Kabuki
  - Bunraku
  - Noh
  - Kyōgen

=== Cuisine of Japan ===
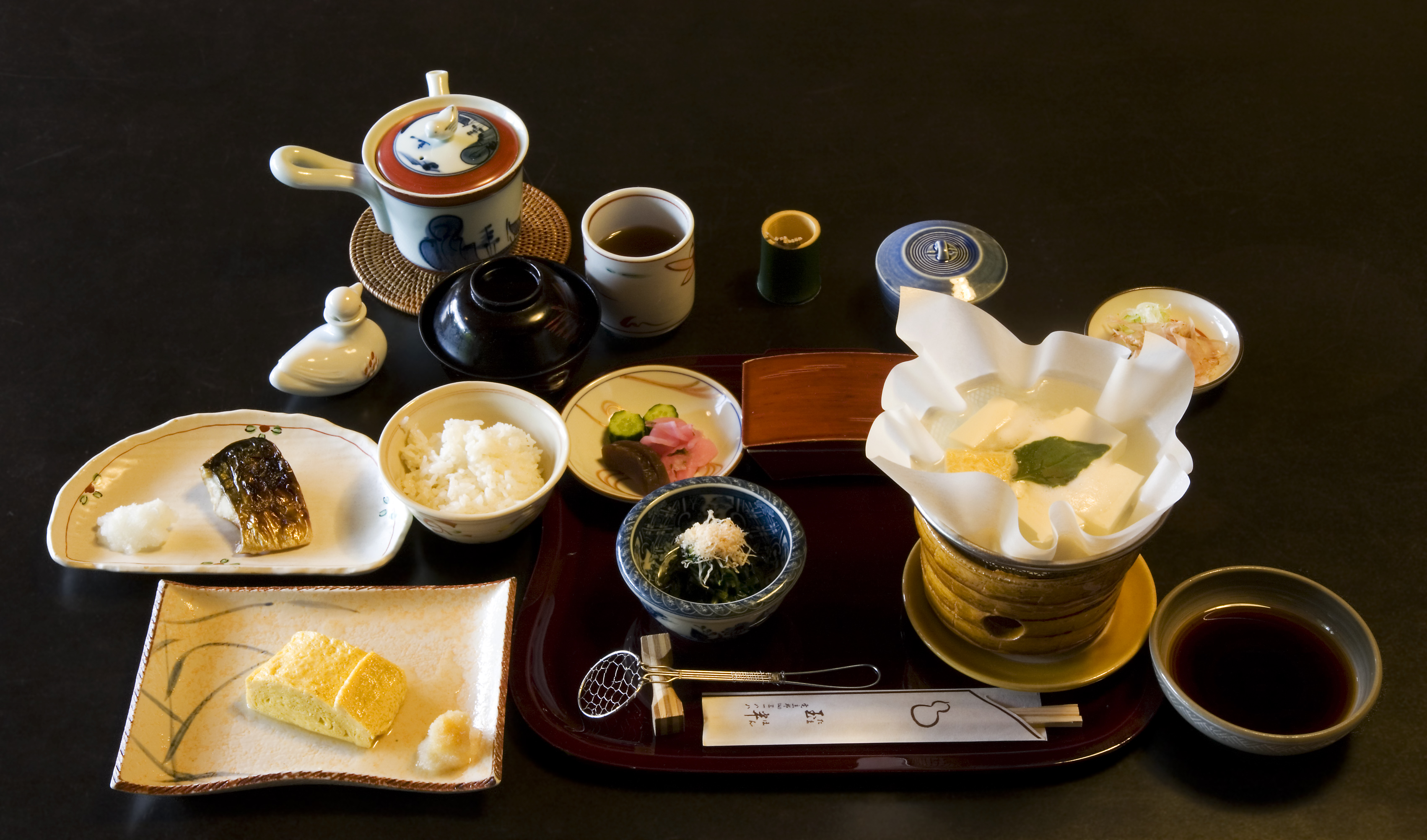
A traditional Japanese breakfast

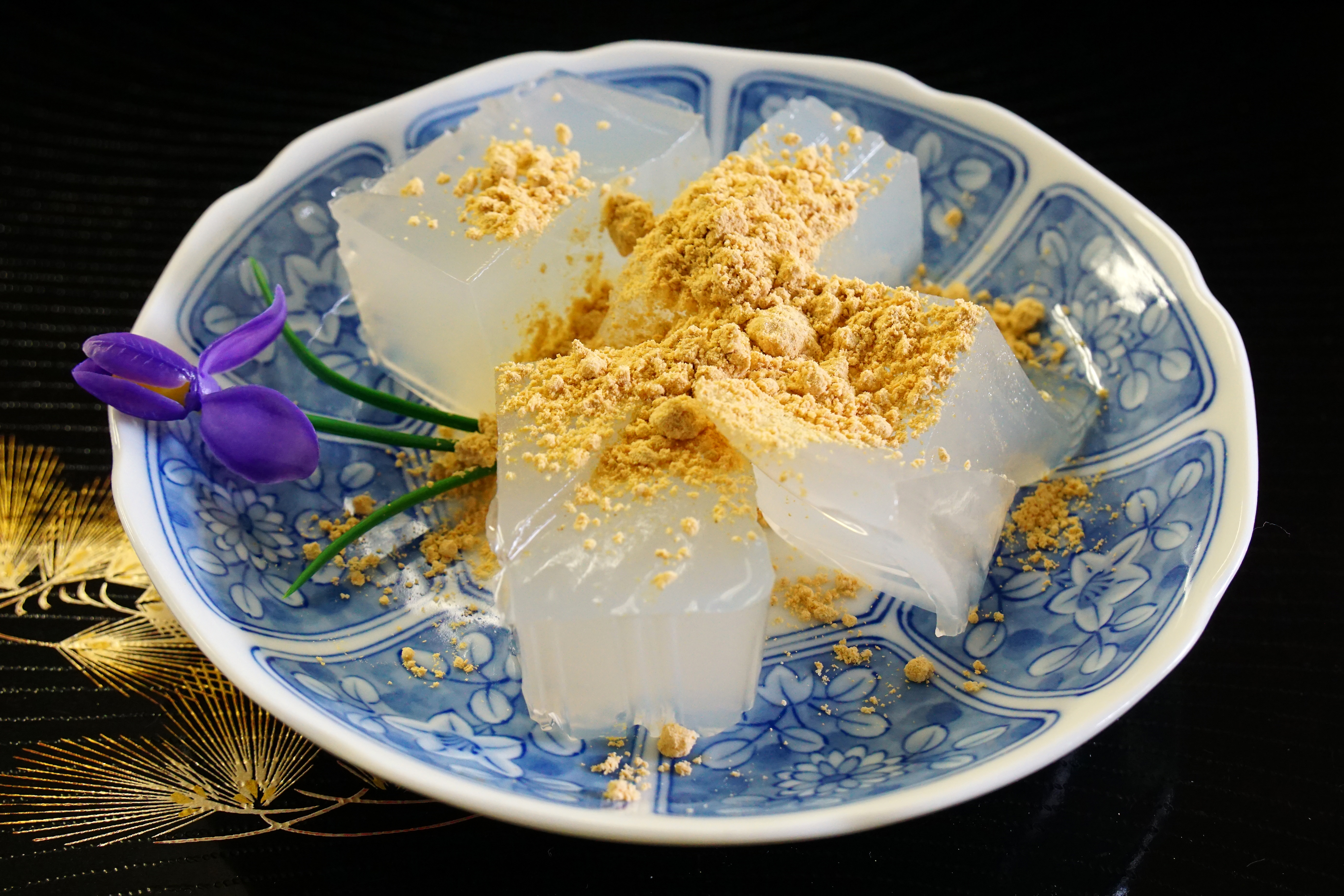
Kuzumochi, a dessert traditionally served chilled

- Japanese regional cuisine
  - Bento
  - Daikon
  - Mochi
  - Ramen
  - Sake
  - Sashimi
  - Sushi
  - Tempura
  - Wasabi
- Japanese desserts and sweets
- Japanese dishes
- Japanese snacks

=== Cultural icons of Japan ===
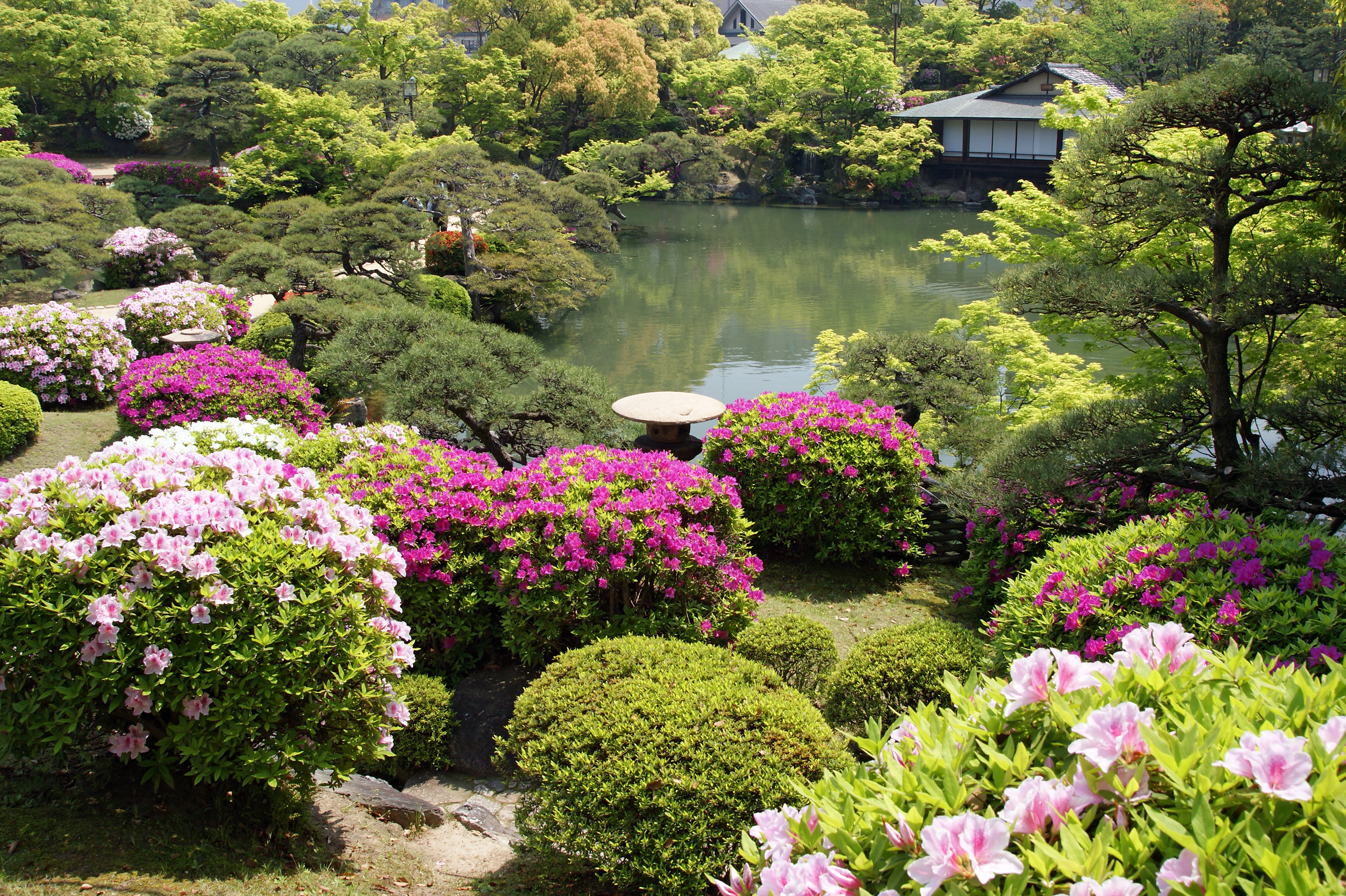
Sōraku-en rhododendron garden

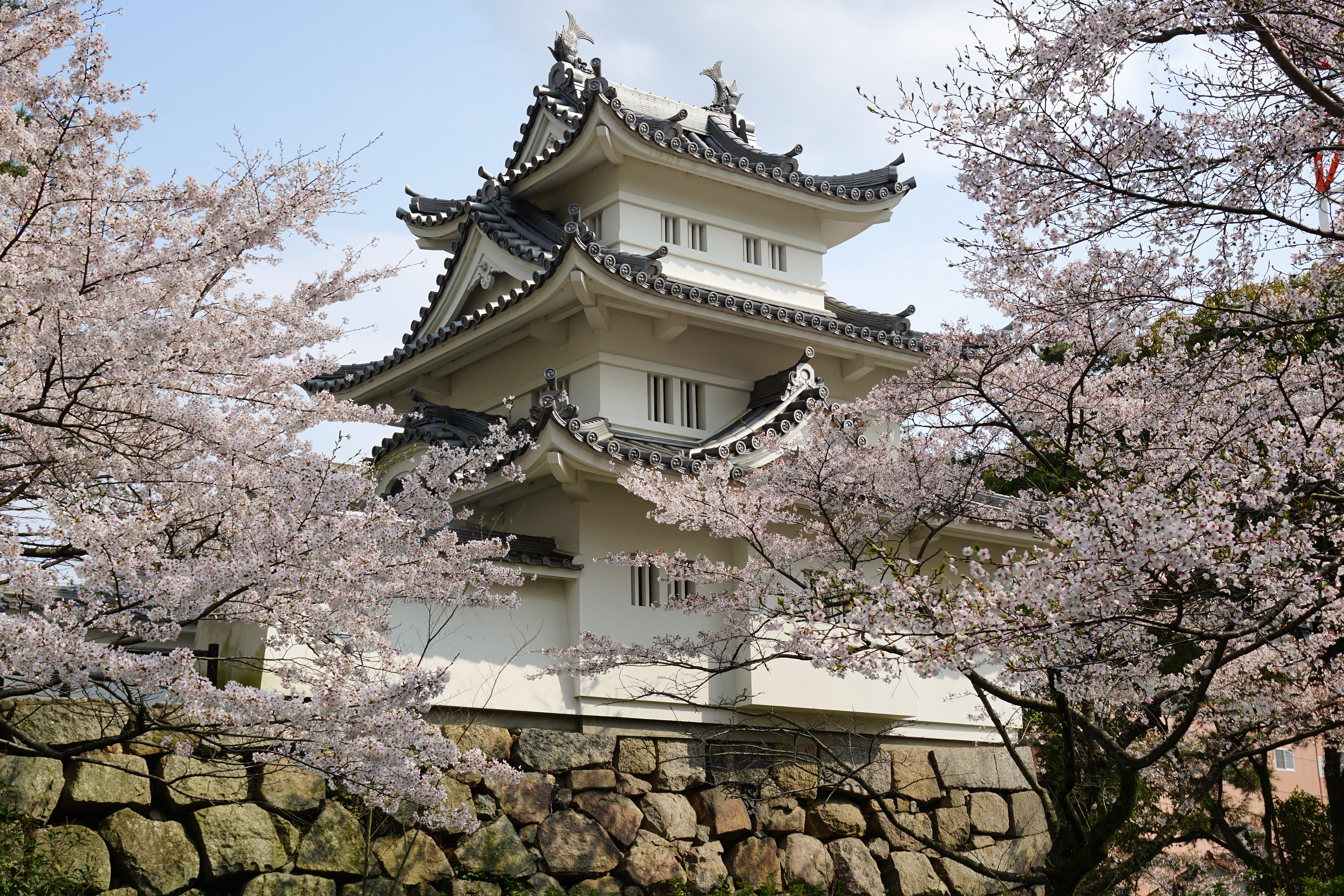
Sakura at Tsu Castle

- Bonsai
- Japanese dragon
- Japanese gardens
- Geisha
  - Maiko
- Karate
  - Black belt
- Kimono
- Ninja
- Rising Sun Flag
- Sakura
- Sumo
- Sushi

=== Fashion in Japan ===
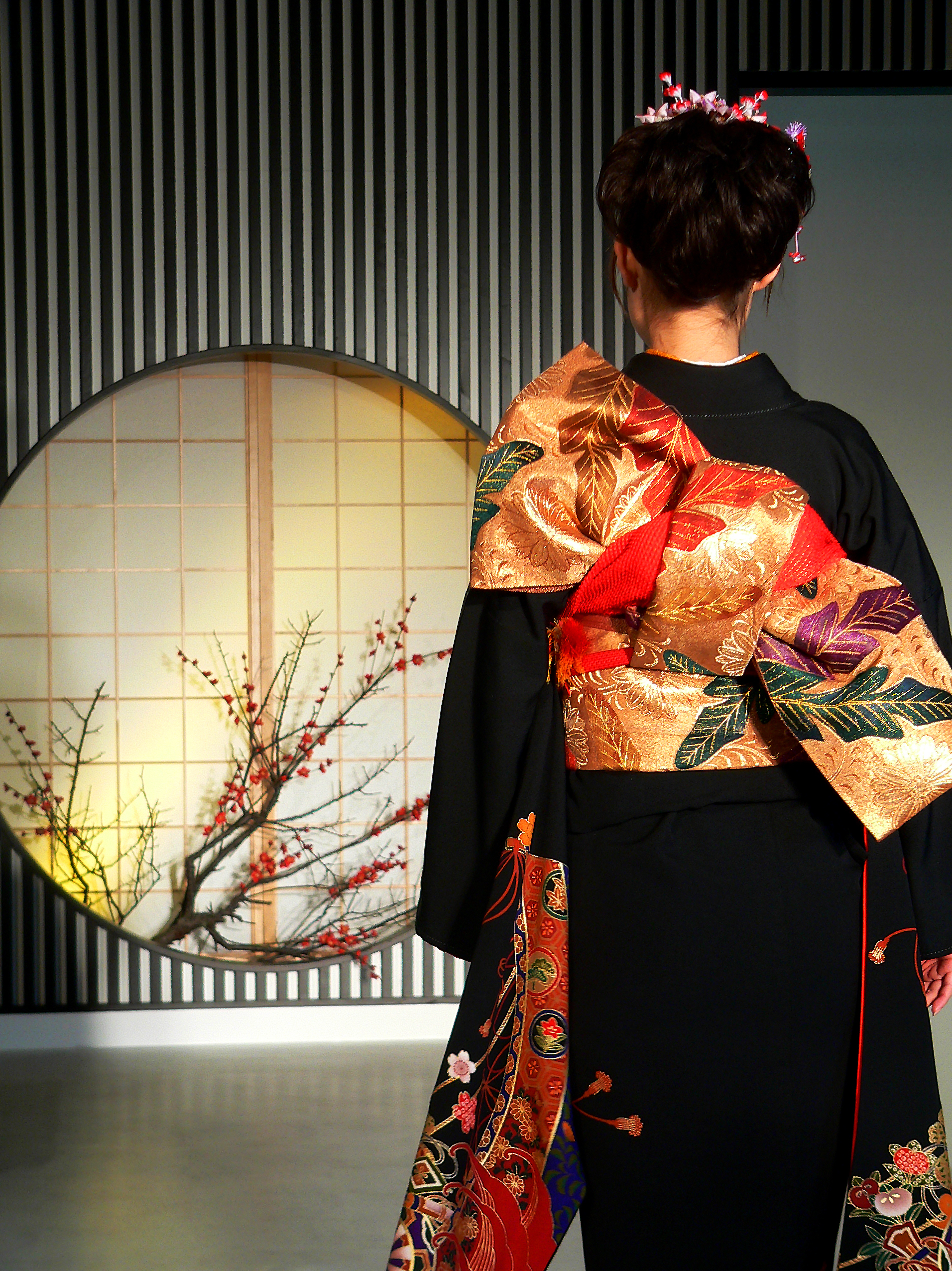
A woman wearing kimono

- Traditional clothing
  - Kimono
    - Furisode
    - Yukata
    - Hakama
      - Jūnihitoe
      - Sokutai
  - Traditional footwear:
    - Geta
    - Zōri
    - Okobo
    - Waraji
    - Tabi
    - Hakama
- School uniforms in Japan
- Japanese street fashion
  - Aristocrat

=== Holidays and festivals of Japan ===
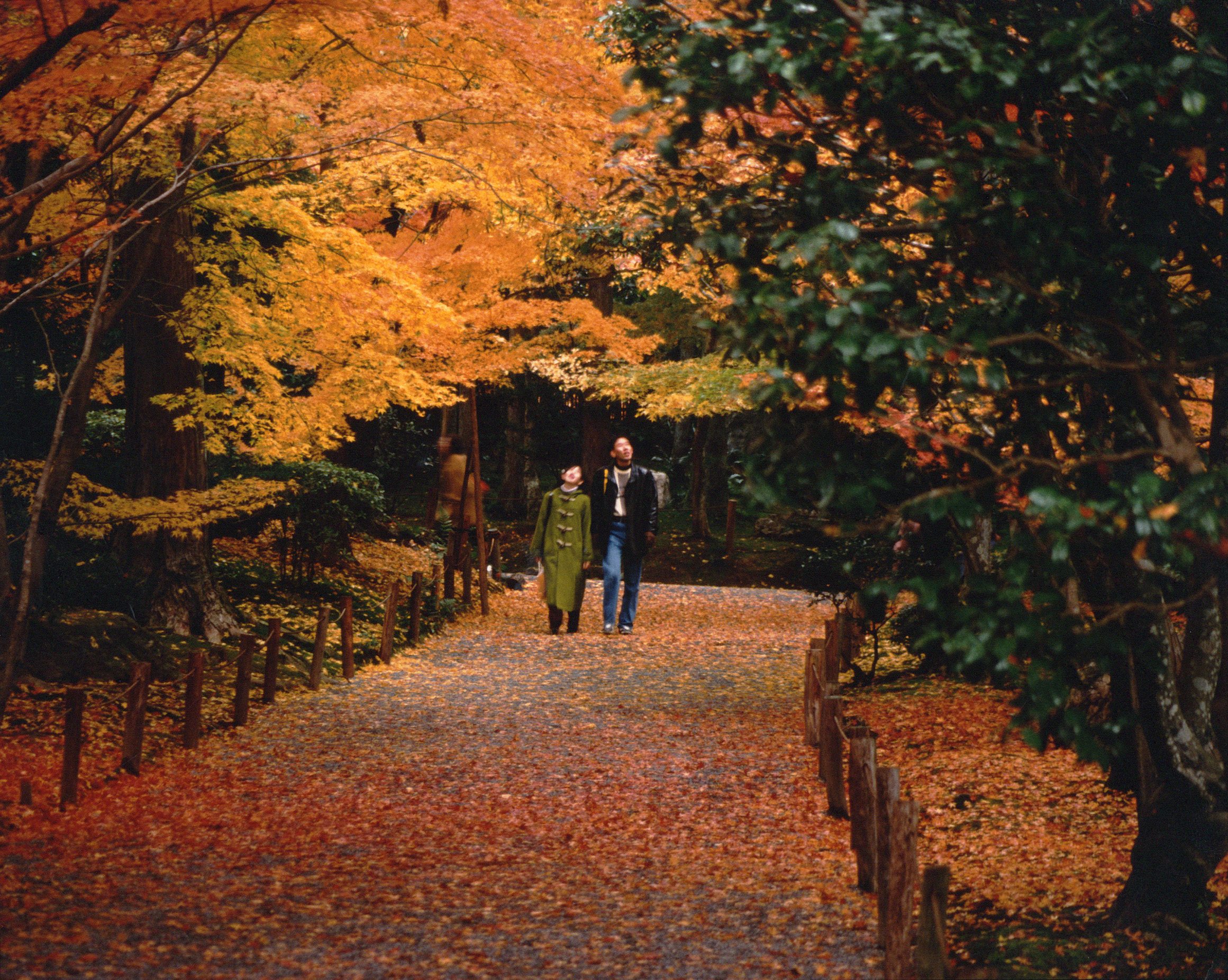
Momijigari at Ryōan-ji in Kyoto

- Golden Week
  - Shōwa Day
  - Constitution Memorial Day
  - Greenery Day
  - Kodomo no Hi
- Hanami
- Hinamatsuri
- Momijigari
- O-Bon
- Setsubun
- Tanabata

=== Homes in Japan ===
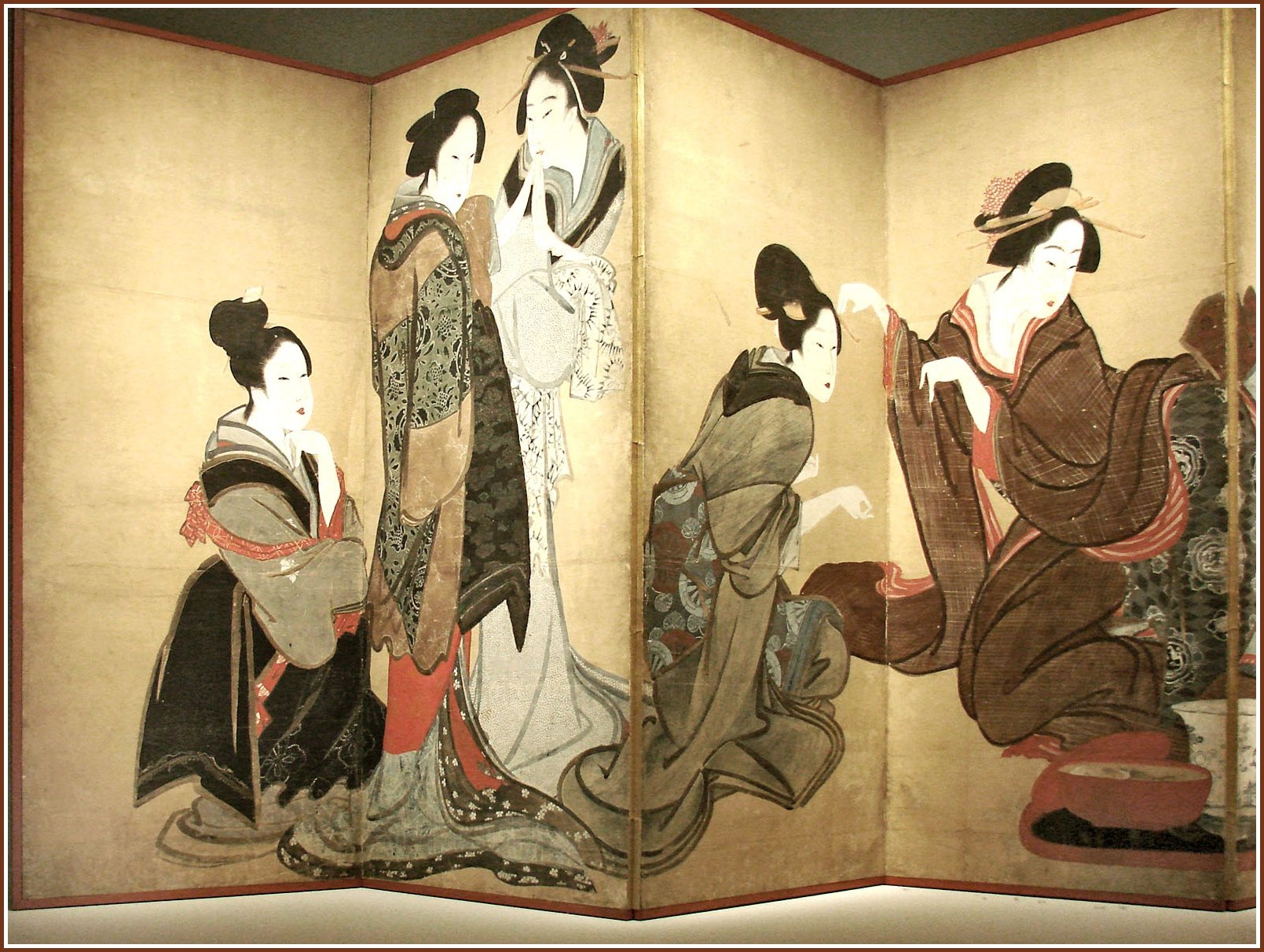
Byōbu, an eight-panel folding screen from the 19th century

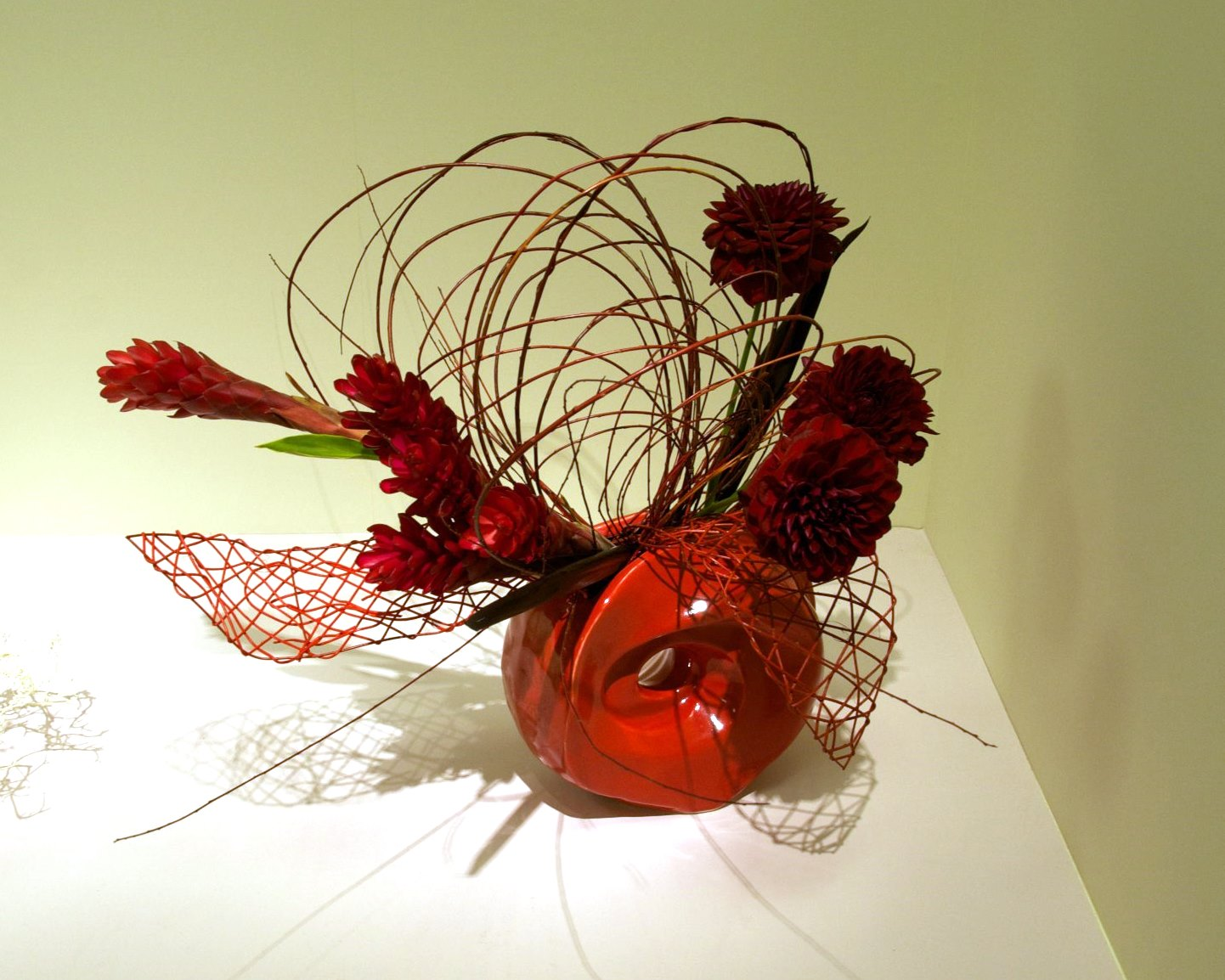
Sōgetsu-ryū ikebana arrangement

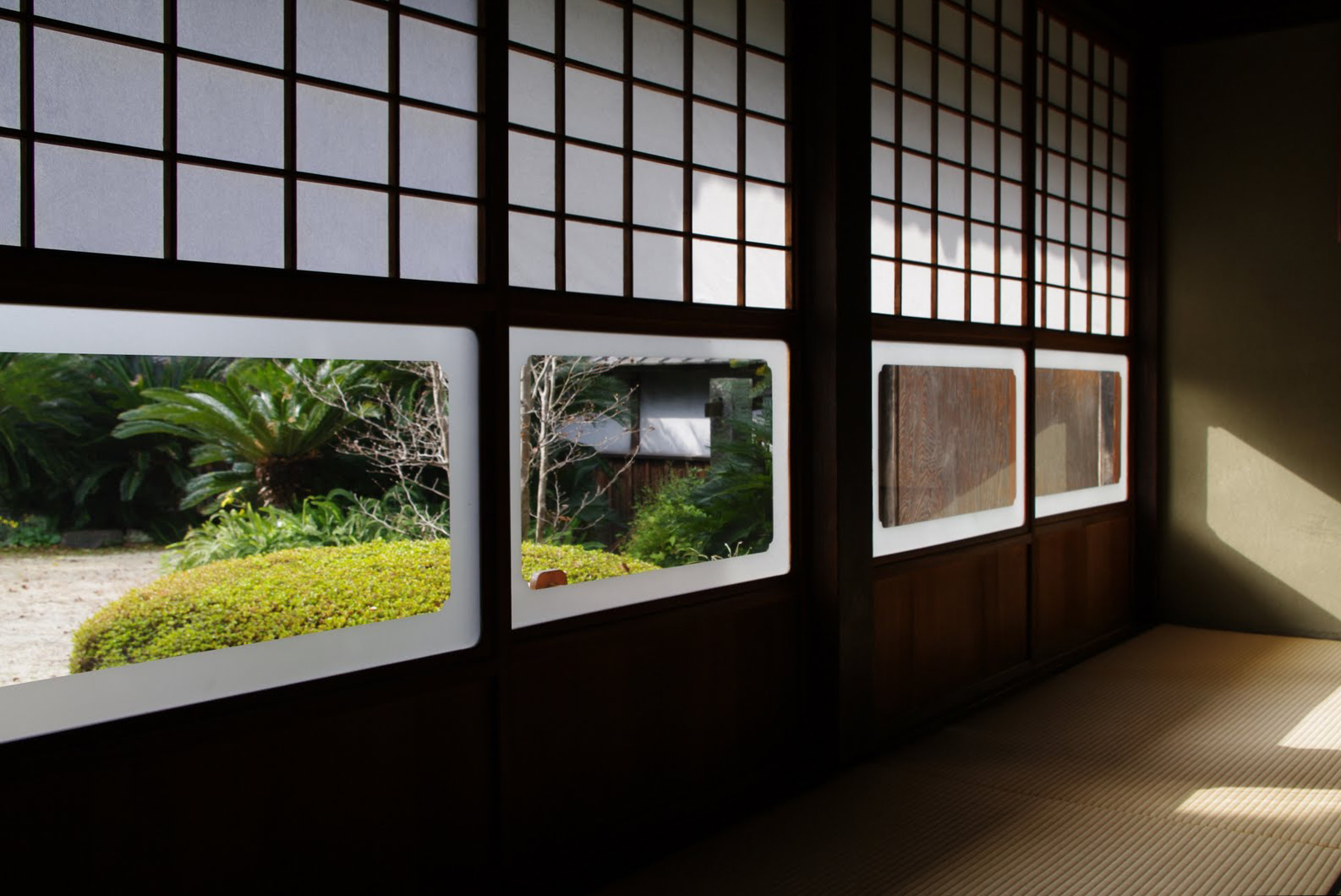
Shōji

- Furnishings
  - Butsudan
  - Byōbu
  - Chabudai
  - Furo
  - Futon
  - Kamidana
  - Kotatsu
  - Ikebana
  - Sudare
  - Tansu
  - Toilets in Japan
  - Zabuton
- Minka
- Rooms
  - Japanese kitchen
  - Washitsu
    - Fusuma
    - Shōji
    - Tatami (flooring)
    - Tokonoma

=== Language in Japan ===
- Japanese language
  - Historical kana usage
  - Japanese grammar
  - Japanese phonology
  - Romanization of Japanese
- Japanese dialects
  - Kansai dialect
  - Saga-ben
  - Wasei-eigo (Japanese English)
- Ryukyuan languages
  - Amami
  - Kikai
  - Okinawan
  - Kunigami
  - Yoron
  - Miyako
  - Yaeyama
  - Yonaguni
- Foreign Variations
  - Franponais
  - Engrish
- Writing systems of Japan
  - Kanji
  - Hiragana
  - Katakana
  - Furigana

=== People of Japan ===
- Japanese celebrities
- Japanese diaspora
- Elderly people in Japan
- Japanese family
- Homosexuality in Japan
- Japanese names
- Women in Japan

==== Ethnicity in Japan ====
- Ethnic issues in Japan
- Ainu people
- Burakumin
- Dekasegi
- Ryukyuan people
- Yamato people

==== Stereotypes in Japan ====
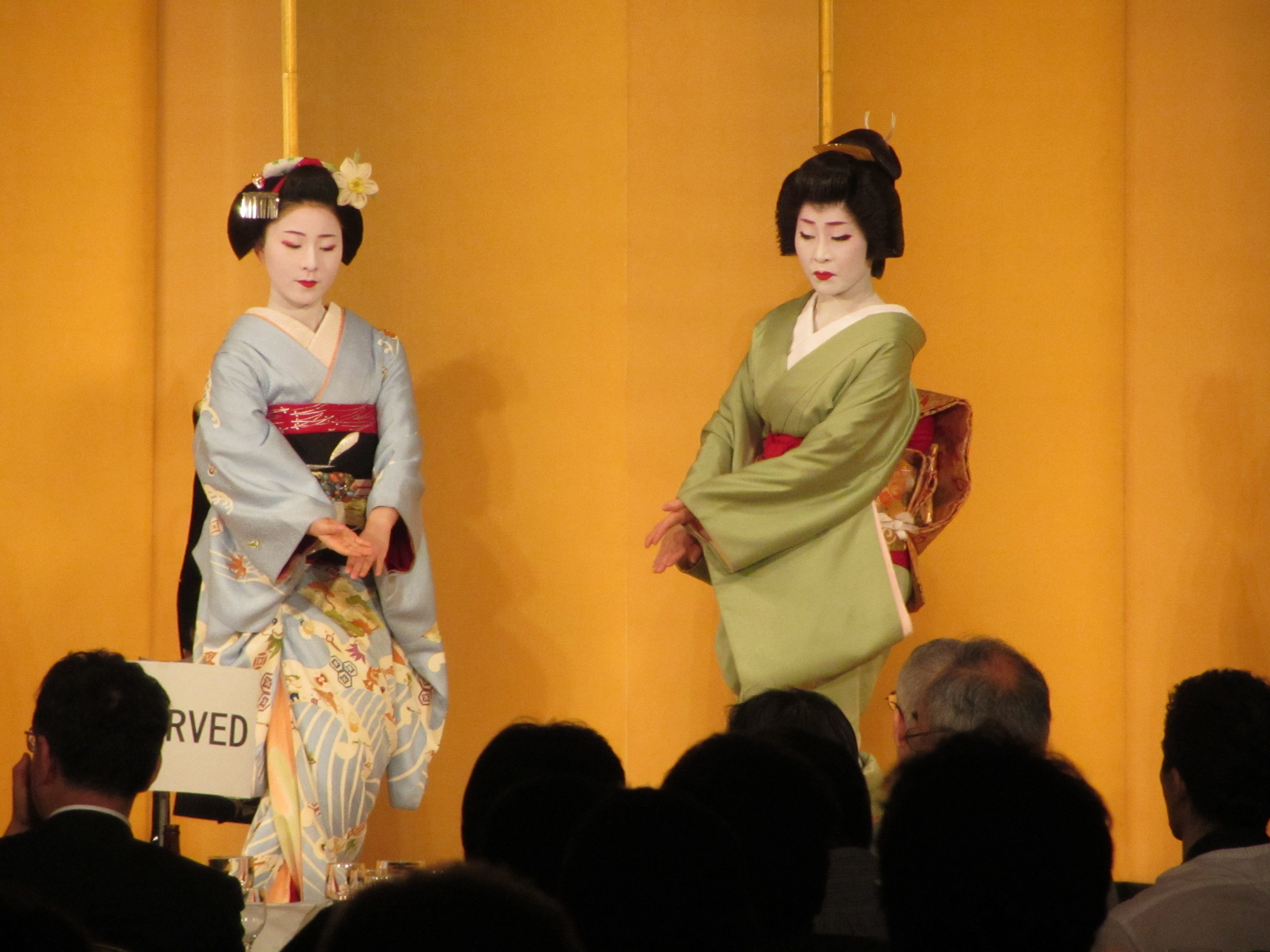
A geisha and a maiko dancing

- Geisha
- Freeter
- Hikikomori
- Kogaru
- Otaku
- Yakuza
- Burakumin

=== Religion in Japan ===
- Buddhism in Japan
  - Nichiren Buddhism
  - Shingon
  - Tendai
  - Pure Land Buddhism
  - Zen
- Shinto
- Christianity in Japan
  - Protestantism in Japan
  - Roman Catholicism in Japan
  - Japanese Orthodox Church
- Judaism in Japan
- Islam in Japan
  - Ahmadiyya in Japan
- Neo-Confucianism in Japan
- Japanese new religions
- Hinduism in Japan
- Japanese mythology

=== Sports and gaming in Japan ===
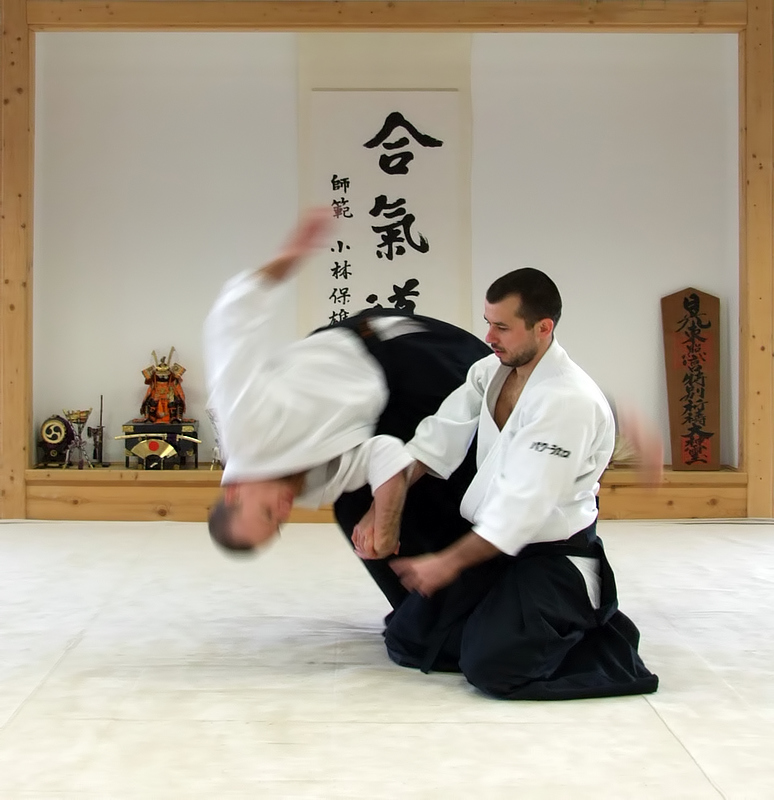
Aikido, a modern Japanese martial art

- Sports
  - Aikido
  - Baseball in Japan
  - Association football in Japan
  - Kendo
  - Puroresu (professional wrestling)
  - Sumo
- Traditional games
  - Go
  - Shogi
  - Mahjong
  - Hanafuda

== Economy and infrastructure of Japan ==
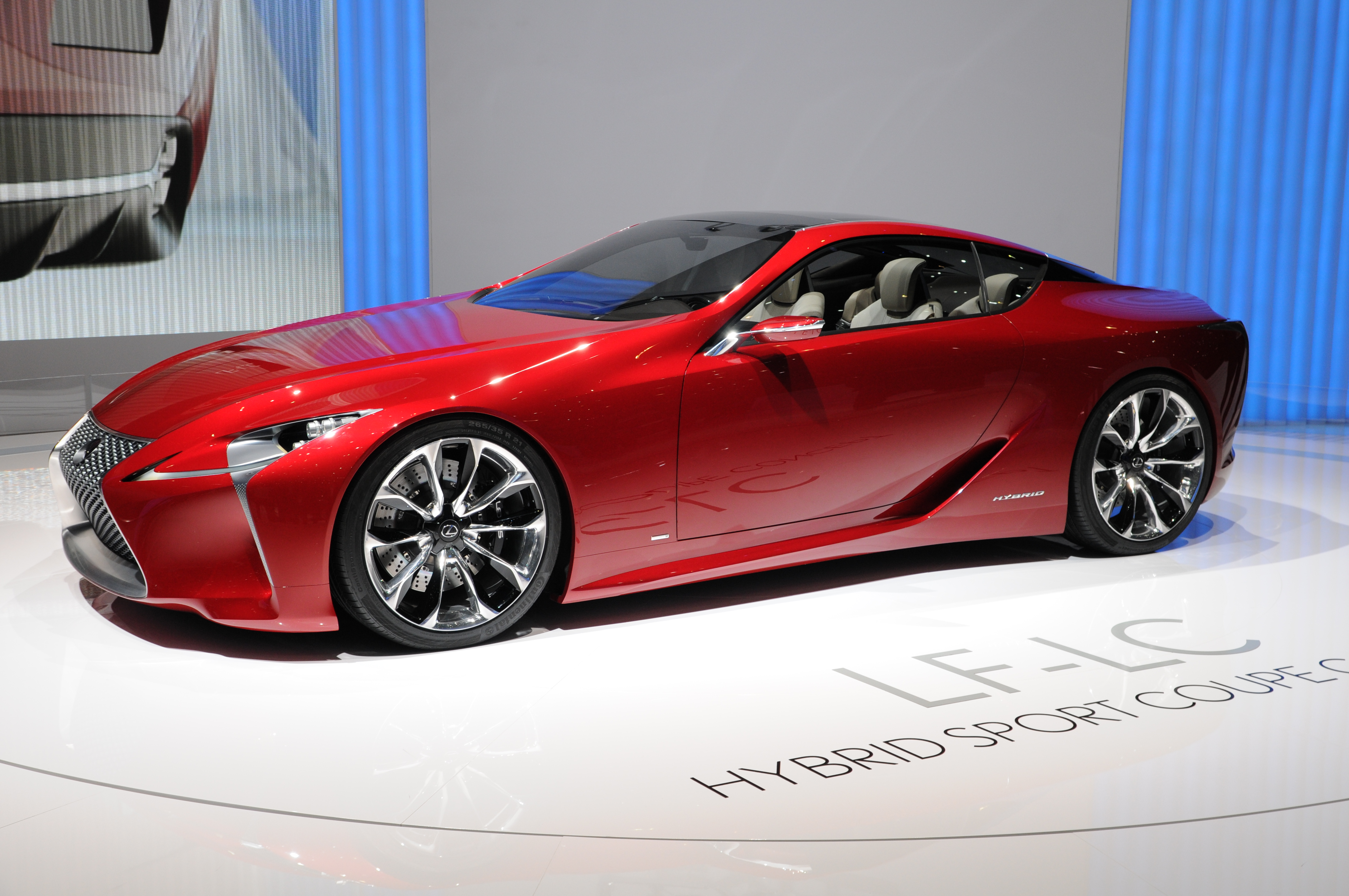
Lexus LF-LC concept, a two-door coupé produced by Lexus

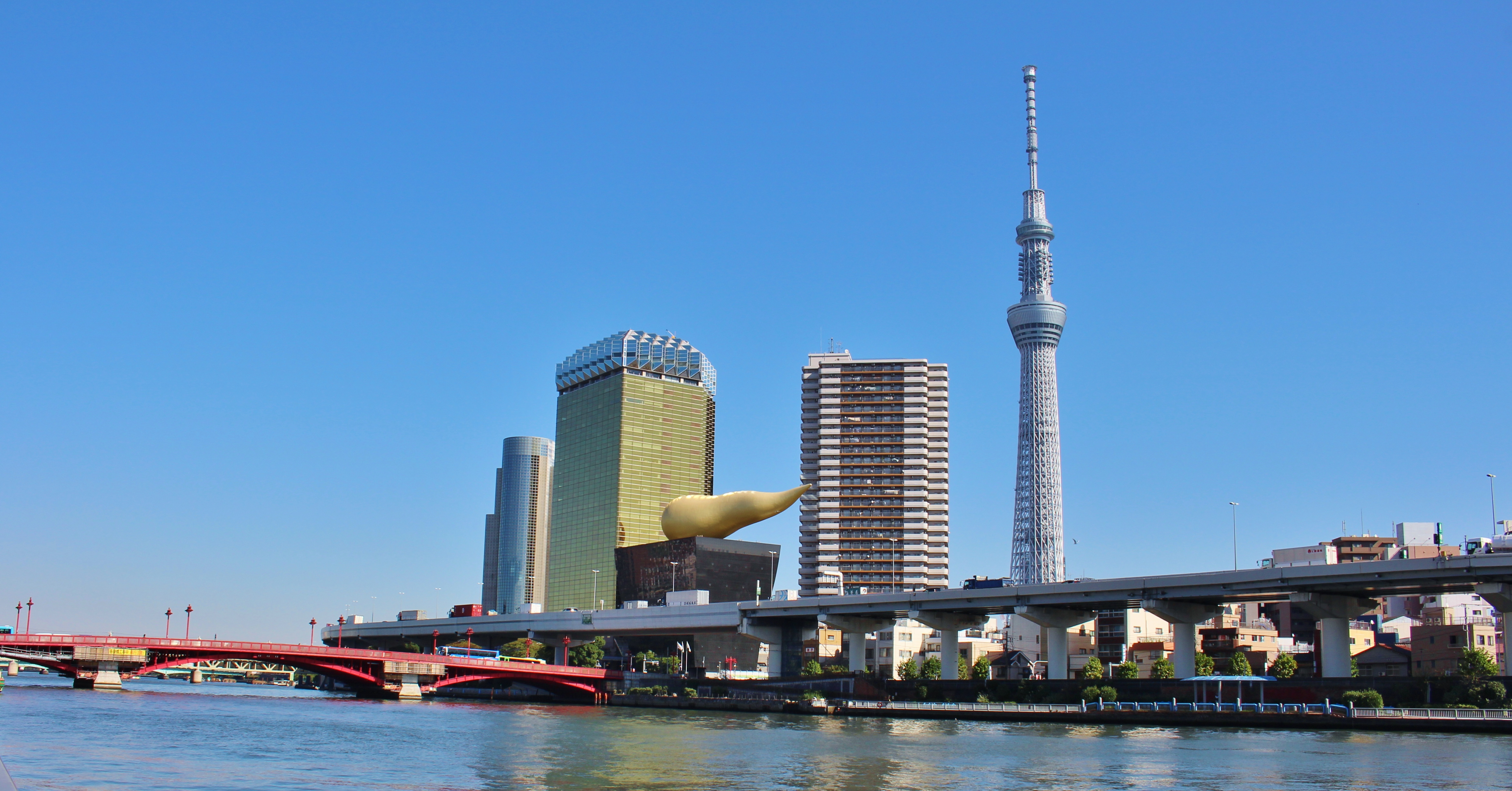
Tokyo Skytree, the tallest structure in Japan

Economy of Japan

- Economic rank, by nominal GDP (2007): 2nd (second)
- Agriculture, forestry, and fishing in Japan
- Automotive industry in Japan
- Bank of Japan
- Buildings and structures in Japan
  - Tallest buildings and structures in Japan
- Companies of Japan
- Communications in Japan
  - Internet in Japan
- Construction industry of Japan
- Consumer electronics industry of Japan
- Currency of Japan: Yen
  - ISO 4217: JPY
- Department stores in Japan
- Defense industry of Japan
- Economic history of Japan
- Economic relations of Japan
- Energy in Japan
  - Nuclear power in Japan
- Financial system of Japan
- Health care in Japan

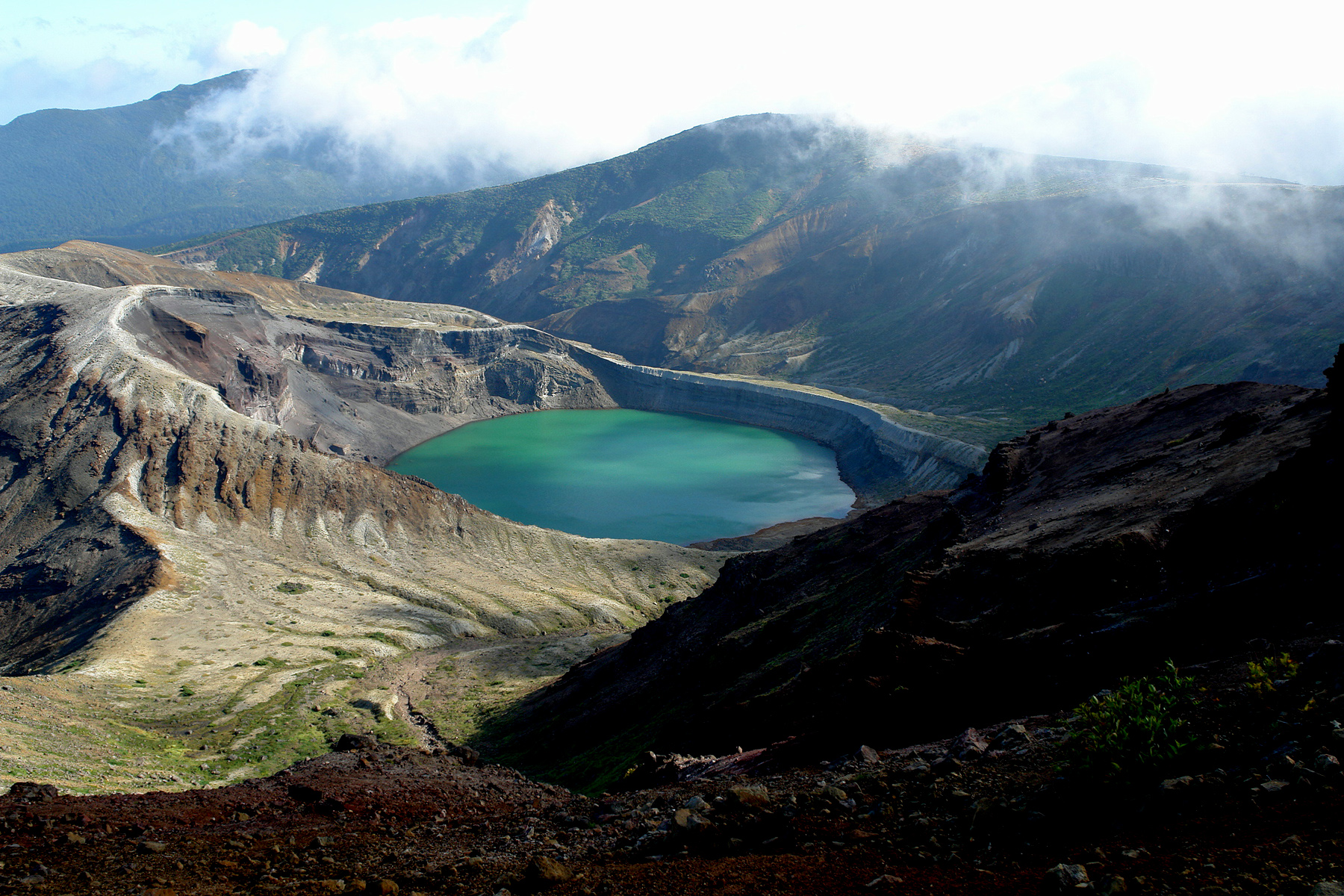
Zaō Quasi-National Park

- Labor market of Japan
- Manufacturing industries of Japan
- Monetary and fiscal policy of Japan
- Mining in Japan
- National parks of Japan
- Private enterprise in Japan
- Research and development in Japan
- Standard of living in Japan
- Trade policy of Japan
- Trade and services in Japan
- Tourism in Japan
  - Visa policy of Japan

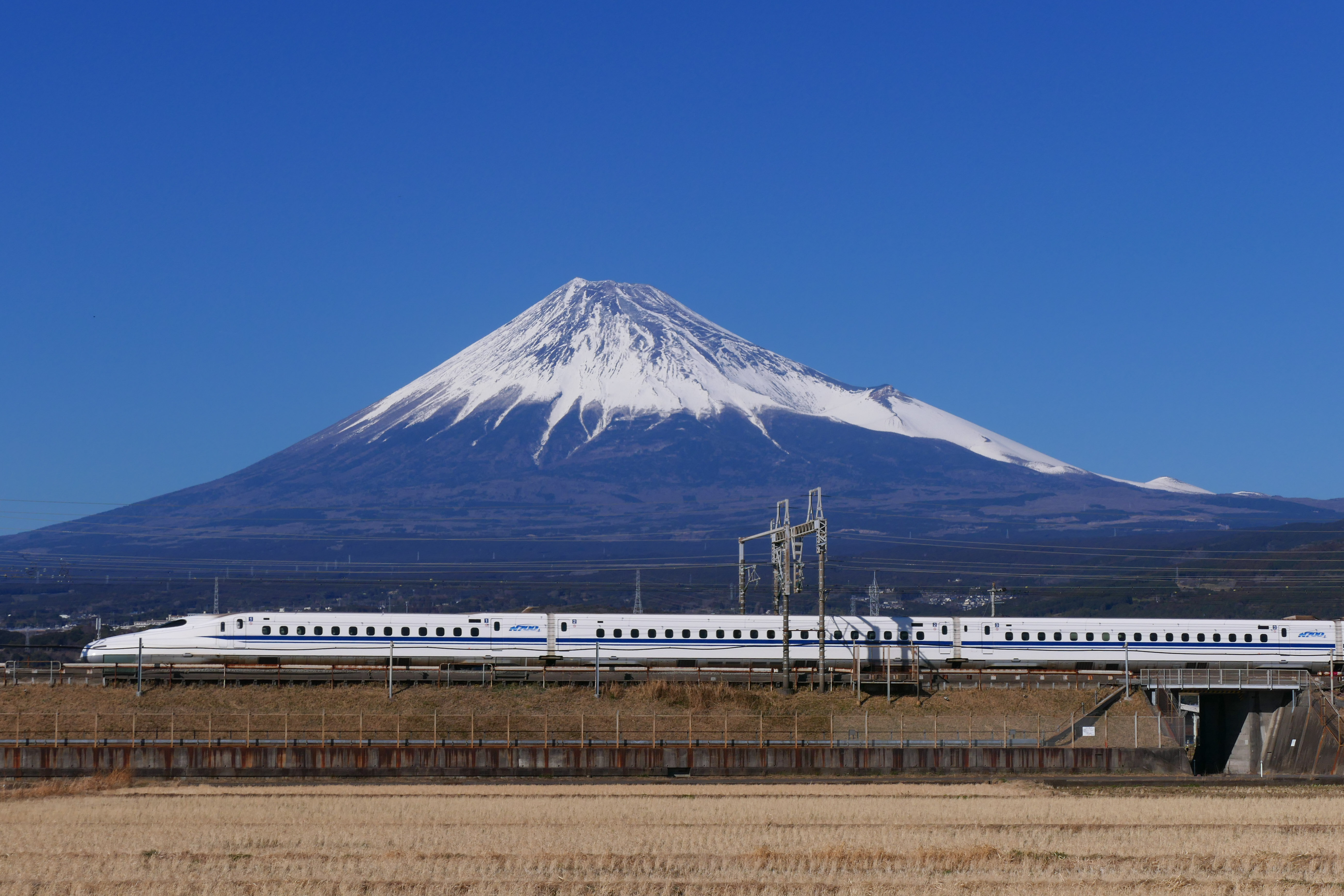
Shinkansen

- Transport in Japan
  - Airports in Japan
  - Expressways of Japan
  - National highways of Japan
  - Shinkansen
  - Tokyo Metro
  - Rail transport in Japan
- Water supply and sanitation in Japan

== Education in Japan ==
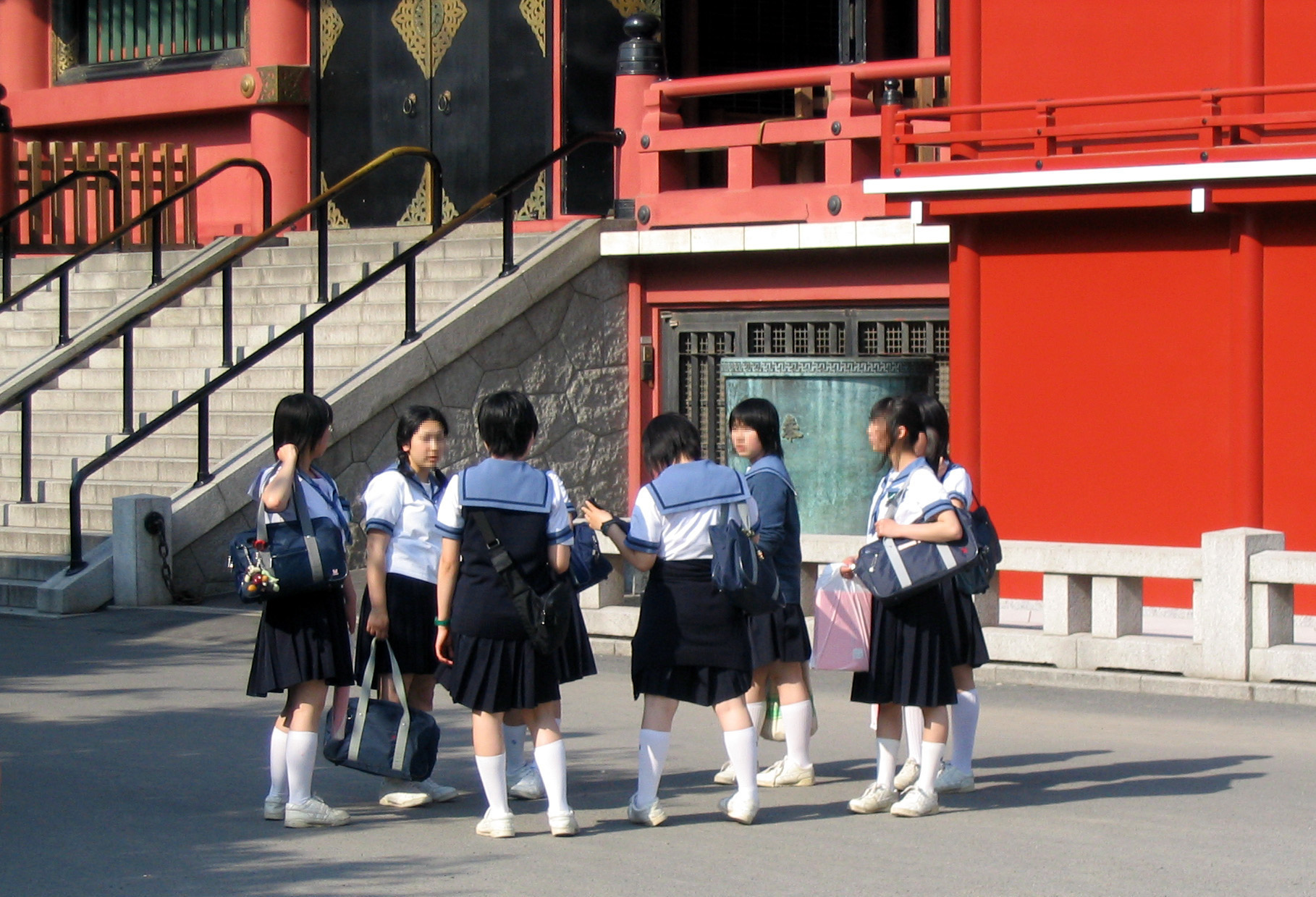
Japanese junior high school students in sailor outfit-style school uniforms

- History of education in Japan
- Japanese history textbook controversies
- Juku (Cram School)
- Language minority students in Japanese classrooms
- Romanization of Japanese
- School uniforms in Japan
- Yutori education

=== Structure of education in Japan ===
- Elementary schools in Japan
- Secondary education in Japan
- Higher education in Japan

== Health in Japan ==
- Smoking in Japan

== Science and technology of Japan ==
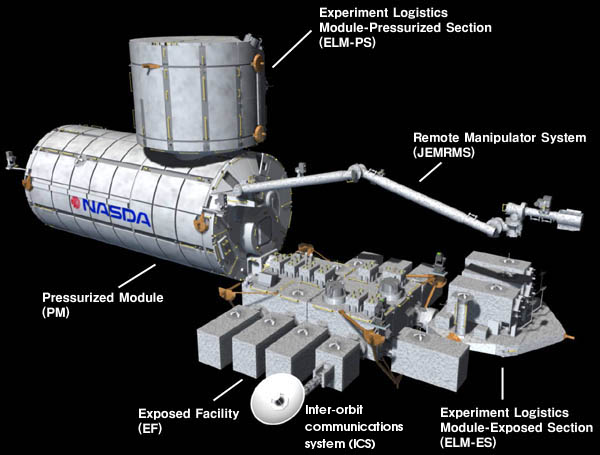
JAXA Kibo, the largest module for the International Space Station

- Japan Aerospace Exploration Agency
- Research and development in Japan
- Japanese robotics

== See also ==
- List of international rankings
- List of Japan-related topics
- Member state of the Group of Twenty Finance Ministers and Central Bank Governors
- Member states of the United Nations
- Migration in Japan
- Outline of Asia
- Outline of geography
- Tourism in Japan
