= Yasukuni Shrine =

Shinto shrine in Tokyo, Japan

- 靖国神社; Yasukuni Jinja
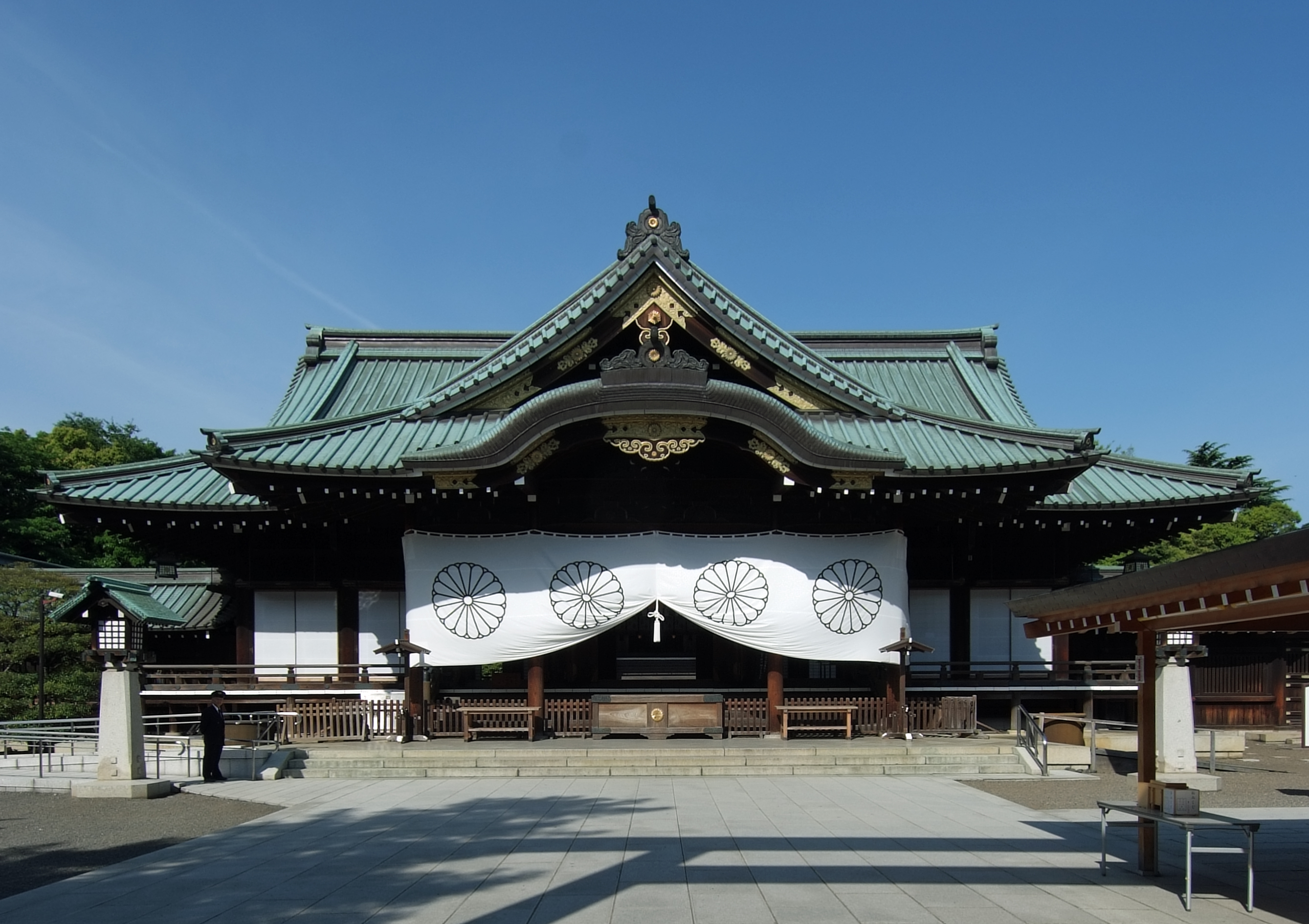
- The haiden (hall of worship)

- Location within Japan Location within Tokyo Location within Special wards of Tokyo

Religion
- Affiliation: Shinto
- Festivals: Shunki Reitaisai (spring); Shuki Reitaisai (autumn)
- Type: Chokusaisha (former bekkaku-kanpeisha)

Location
- Location: 3-1-1 Kudankita, Chiyoda, Tokyo 102-8246
- Coordinates: 35°41′38″N 139°44′34″E

Architecture
- Style: Shinmei-zukuri, copper roofing (dōbanbuki)
- Founder: Emperor Meiji
- Established: June 1869

Website
- www.yasukuni.or.jp/english/

Yasukuni Shrine (Japanese: 靖国神社 or 靖國神社, Hepburn: Yasukuni Jinja; lit. 'Peaceful Country Shrine') is a Shinto shrine located in Chiyoda, Tokyo. It was founded by Emperor Meiji in June 1869 and commemorates those who died in service of Japan, from the Boshin War of 1868–1869, to the two Sino-Japanese Wars, 1894–1895 and 1937–1945 respectively, and the First Indochina War of 1946–1954. The shrine's purpose has been expanded over the years to include those who died in the wars involving Japan spanning from the entire Meiji and Taishō periods, and the earlier part of the Shōwa period.

The shrine lists the names, origins, birthdates and places of death of 2,466,532 people. Among those are 1,068 convicted war criminals from the Pacific War, fourteen of whom were convicted with Class A crimes at the Tokyo Trial. A memorial at the honden (main hall) building commemorates anyone who died on behalf of Japan and so includes Koreans and Taiwanese who served Japan at the time. The Chinreisha ("Spirit Pacifying Shrine") building is a shrine built to inter the souls of all the people who died during World War II, regardless of their nationality.

The enshrinement of an extensive number of war criminals, as well as the shrine's historical association with State Shinto, has made the shrine highly controversial within East Asia, particularly amongst victims of Japanese imperialism. Emperor Hirohito, under whom Japan fought during World War II, visited the shrine eight times between the end of the war and 1975. However, he thereafter boycotted the shrine due to his displeasure over the enshrinement of top convicted Japanese war criminals. His successors, Akihito and Naruhito, have never visited the shrine. The Japanese Government's involvement with the shrine remains highly controversial, with the most recent Japanese Prime Minister to visit the shrine while in office being the conservative Shinzo Abe in 2013.

== History ==
=== Foundation for the dead in the Boshin War and Meiji Restoration ===
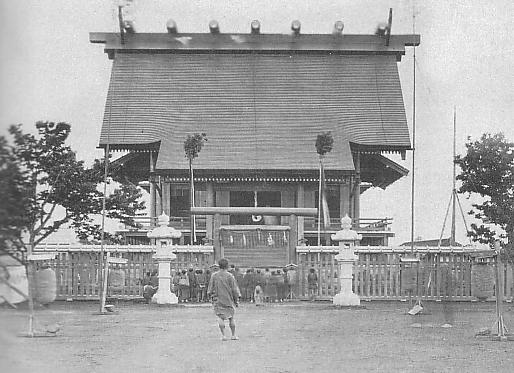
Tōkyō Shōkonsha in 1873

The site for the Yasukuni Shrine, originally named Tōkyō Shōkonsha (東京招魂社, "shrine to summon the souls"), was chosen by order of the Meiji Emperor. The shrine was established in 1869, in the wake of the Boshin War, in order to honor the souls of those who died fighting for the Emperor. It initially served as the "apex" of a network of similar shrines throughout Japan that had originally been established for the souls of various feudal lords' retainers, and which continued to enshrine local individuals who died in the Emperor's service.

Following the 1877 Satsuma Rebellion, the Emperor had 6,959 souls of war dead enshrined at Tōkyō Shōkonsha. In 1879, the shrine was renamed Yasukuni Jinja. The name Yasukuni, quoted from the phrase "吾以靖國也" in the classical-era Chinese text Zuo Zhuan (Scroll 6, 23rd Year of Duke Xi), literally means "Pacifying the Nation" and was chosen by the Meiji Emperor. The name is formally written as 靖國神社, using the kyūjitai character forms common before the end of the Pacific War.

- Among the enshrined are Yoshida Shōin, Sakamoto Ryōma, Takasugi Shinsaku, Nakaoka Shintarō, Takechi Hanpeita, Sanai Hashimoto, and Ōmura Masujirō, who contributed to the Tokugawa shogunate's overthrow and the Meiji Restoration during the Bakumatsu period in Japan. In contrast, the shrine does not enshrine the war dead of shogunate retainers such as the soldiers of the former Shogunate forces, the Ouetsu Reppan Domei, the Shinsengumi and the Shogitai.
- Although Saigō Takamori, Eto Shinpei and Maebara Issei made a contribution to the Meiji Restoration, they were not enshrined because they revolted against the Meiji government after that.

=== From First Sino-Japanese War to Second Sino-Japanese War ===
The enshrinement of war dead at Yasukuni was transferred to military control in 1887. As the Empire of Japan expanded, Okinawans, Ainu and Koreans were enshrined at Yasukuni alongside ethnic Japanese. Emperor Meiji refused to allow the enshrinement of Taiwanese due to the organized resistance that followed the Treaty of Shimonoseki, but Taiwanese were later admitted due to the need to conscript them during World War II. In 1932, two Sophia University (Jōchi Daigaku) Catholic students refused visit to Yasukuni Shrine on the grounds that it was contrary to their religious convictions.

In 1936, the Society for the Propagation of the Faith (Propaganda Fide) of the Roman Curia issued the Instruction Pluries Instanterque, and approved visits to Yasukuni Shrine as an expression of patriotic motive. This response allowed the Jesuit university to avoid potential repercussions, though it aligned the institution with the prevailing national policy.

=== During World War II and the GHQ control period ===
By the 1930s, the military government sought centralized state control over memorialization of the war dead, giving Yasukuni a more central role. Enshrinements at Yasukuni were originally announced in the government's official gazette so that the souls could be treated as national heroes. In April 1944, this practice ended and the identities of the spirits were concealed from the general public.

The shrine was used as a focal point for fostering military and civilian morale during the war era, often emphasizing dedication to the Emperor. Enshrinement at Yasukuni signified meaning and nobility to those who died for their country. During the final days of the war, it was common for soldiers sent on kamikaze suicide missions to say that they would "meet again at Yasukuni" following their death. Some wartime military songs referenced Yasukuni, such as "Doki no Sakura" (同期の櫻) and "Calming the Country" (國の鎮め). At that time, however, the coalition saw that Japan, which was in a tight corner, was using Yasukuni for propaganda purposes. During wartime, Yasukuni Shrine was used as a symbolic motivator for soldiers, with some references in military rhetoric linking enshrinement to notions of sacrifice.

After World War II, the US-led Occupation Authorities (known as GHQ for General Headquarters) issued the Shinto Directive, which ordered the separation of church and state and forced Yasukuni Shrine to become either a secular government institution or a religious institution independent from the Japanese government. Yasukuni Shrine has been privately funded and operated since 1946, when it was elected to become an individual religious corporation, independent of the Association of Shinto Shrines.

Some reports suggest that GHQ considered repurposing the Yasukuni Shrine grounds, but the plan was never implemented. However, Father Bruno Bitter of the Roman Curia and Father Patrick Byrne of Maryknoll insisted to the GHQ that honoring their war dead is the right and duty of citizens everywhere, and the GHQ decided not to destroy the Yasukuni shrine. In 1951, the Roman Curia reaffirmed the 1936 ruling that Catholic visits to Yasukuni Shrine could be acceptable as a patriotic gesture rather than a religious act.

=== Post-war issues and controversies ===
==== Enshrinement of war criminals ====
In 1956, the shrine authorities and the Ministry of Health and Welfare established a system for the government to share information with the shrine regarding deceased war veterans. By April 1959, most of Japan's war dead who were not already enshrined at Yasukuni were enshrined in this manner. War criminals prosecuted by the International Military Tribunal for the Far East were initially excluded from enshrinement after the war. In 1951, government authorities began considering their enshrinement, along with providing veterans' benefits to their survivors, following the signature of the Treaty of San Francisco. In 1954, government directed some local memorial shrines to accept the enshrinement of war criminals from their area.

No convicted war criminals were enshrined at Yasukuni until after the parole of the last remaining incarcerated war criminals in 1958. In 1959, the Health and Welfare Ministry began forwarding information on Class B and Class C war criminals (those not involved in the planning, preparation, initiation, or waging of the war) to Yasukuni Shrine. These individuals were gradually enshrined between 1959 and 1967, often without permission from surviving family members.

In 1966, information on fourteen men who had been charged with Class A war crimes was forwarded to the shrine. Eleven were convicted on these charges, one was convicted of Class B war crimes, and two died before completing trial. This group included the prime ministers and top generals from the war era. In 1970, the shrine passed a resolution to enshrine these individuals. The timing for their enshrinement was left to the discretion of head priest Fujimaro Tsukuba, who delayed the enshrinement until his death in March 1978.

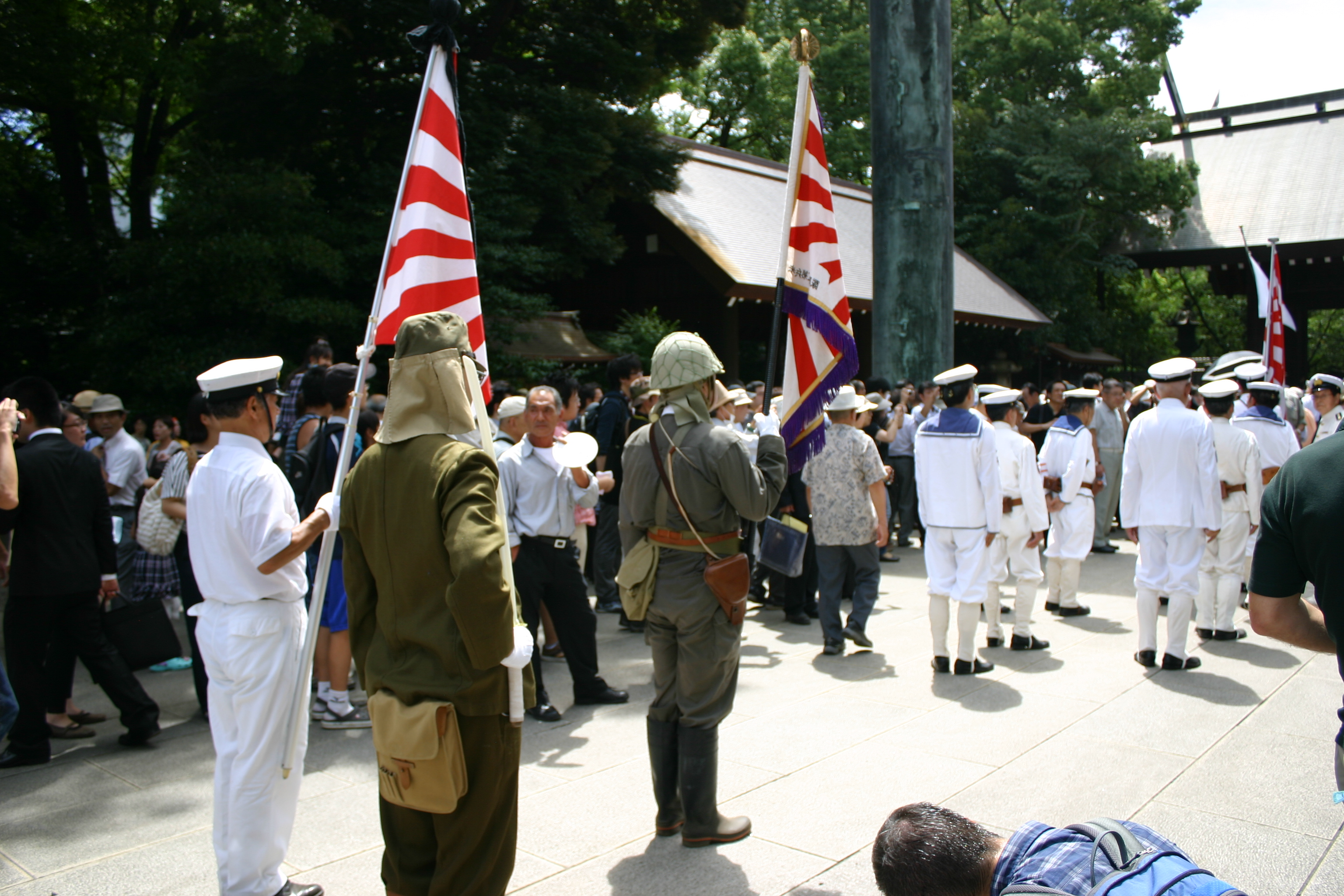
Visitors in military uniforms with the Rising Sun Flag in August 2012

In 1978, his successor Nagayoshi Matsudaira, who rejected the Tokyo war crimes tribunal's verdicts, enshrined these fourteen convicted or alleged war criminals in a secret ceremony. Records indicate that after the enshrinement of convicted war criminals in 1978, no Japanese emperor has visited the shrine. In 1979, the details of the enshrinement of war criminals became public, but there was minimal controversy about the issue for several years. No Emperor of Japan has visited Yasukuni since 1975.

The head-priest Junna Nakata at Honzen-ji Temple (of the Shingon sect Daigo-ha) requested the pontiff Pope Paul VI to say a Mass for the repose of the souls of all people in Yasukuni, which would include the 1,618 men condemned as Class A, B and C war criminals, and he promised to do so. In 1980, Pope John Paul II complied, and a Mass was held in St. Peter's Basilica for all the fallen civilians and fallen dead worshiped in the shrine.

==== Statements by the shrine museum ====
The museum and website of the Yasukuni Shrine have made statements criticizing the United States for "convincing" the Empire of Japan to launch the attack on Pearl Harbor in order to justify the Pacific War, as well as claiming that Japan went to war with the intention of creating a "Co-Prosperity Sphere" for all Asians.

In 2026, the shrine banned cosplay and the wearing of military-related attire on its premises, with exemptions for members of the Japan Self-Defense Forces and foreign military forces, as part of efforts to maintain the "serenity and dignity" of the site.

=== Chronology ===
See details on related controversy in Controversies surrounding Yasukuni Shrine

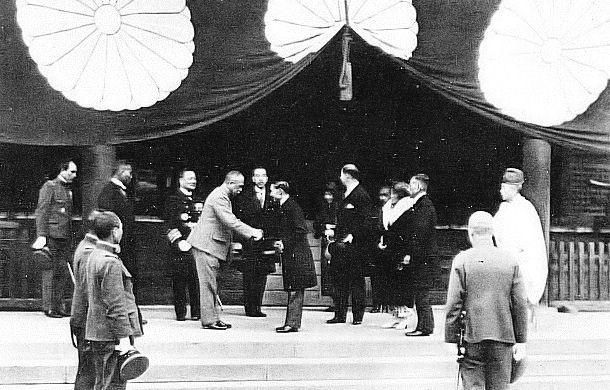
King of Thailand, King Rama VII (Prajadhipok)'s visit to the Yasukuni Shrine, May 1931

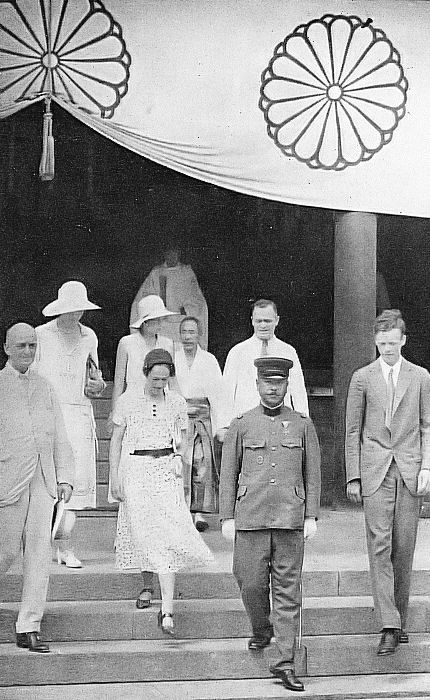
Charles Lindbergh and Anne Morrow Lindbergh visiting Yasukuni Shrine, October 1931

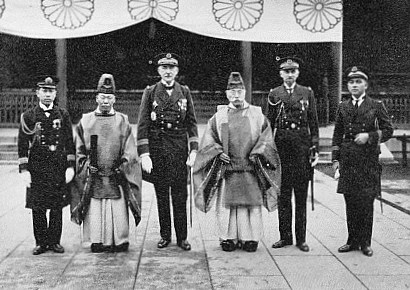
French Navy officers' visit to Yasukuni Shrine, May 1933

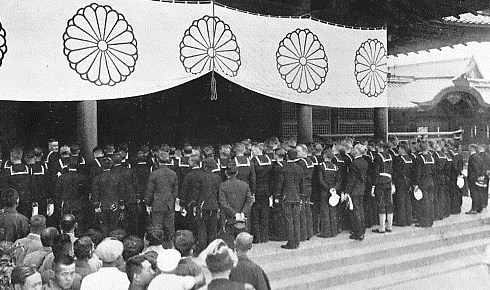
The United States Navy officers' visit to Yasukuni Shrine, July 1933

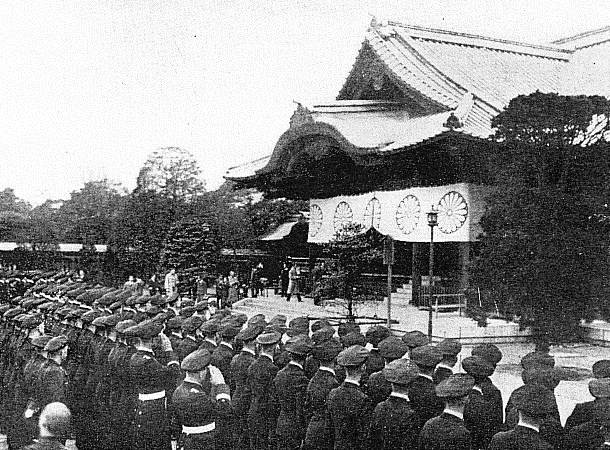
German Navy officers' visit to Yasukuni Shrine, March 1937

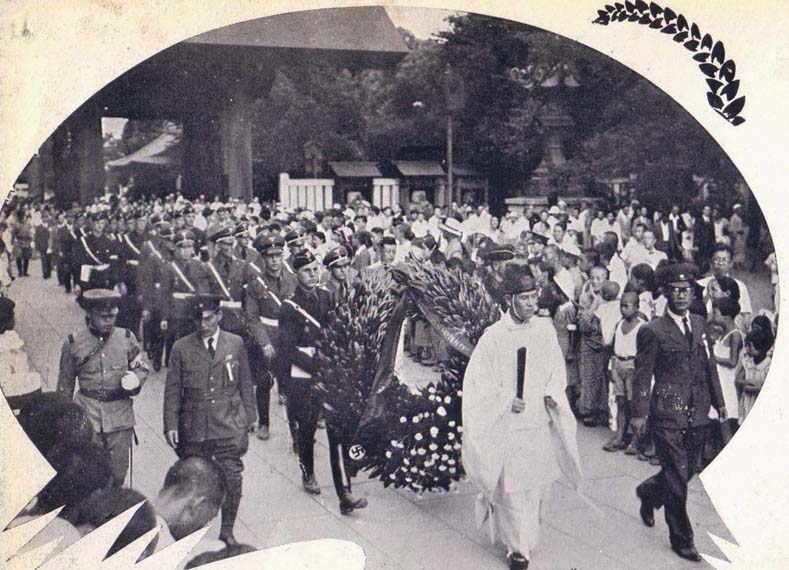
Hitler Youth visit to Yasukuni Shrine, October 1938

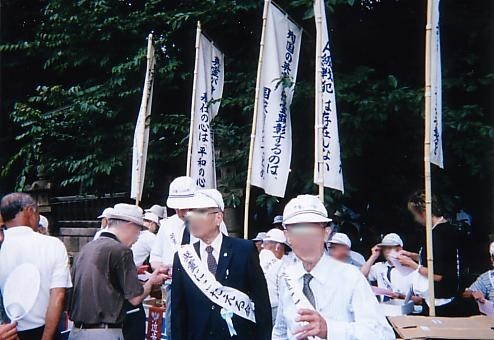
Eirei ni kotaeru Kai (Society for Honoring the Glorious War Dead) members, August 2001

- 1862
  - December — (Tenporeki, or Tenpō calendar): The Shinsōsai (神葬祭) or Shōkonsai (招魂祭) for the Junnan shishi (殉難志士) was held for the first time at the Shindō Sōsaijō Reimeisha (神道葬祭場霊明社; current Kyoto Ryozen Gokoku Shrine) at Higashiyama in Kyoto. The Saijin (deities) enshrined in the Shindō Sōsaijō Reimeisha are three kami including Kikurihime no Kami (菊理媛神).
- 1868
  - January — (Tenpō calendar): The Boshin War started and continued until May 1869 (Tenpō calendar)
  - April 20 — (Tenpō calendar): The tasshi (proclamation) by the Tōkaidō Senpō Sōtokufu (東海道先鋒総督府; Tōkaidō spearhead governor) ordered the creation of a list of the war dead.
  - April 28 (Tenpō calendar): The tasshi by the Tōkaidō Senpō Sōtokufu decided to hold Shōkonsai (招魂祭)
  - May 10 (Tenpō calendar): The Dajokan Fukoku (Proclamation or Decree by the Grand Council of State) ordered the enshrinement of the war dead at Higashiyama-ku, Kyoto (Current Kyoto Ryozen Gokoku Shrine).
  - May 28 (Tenpō calendar): The tasshi by the Gyōseikan (行政官; administrative officers) ordered submission of the list of the war dead to Jingikan (神祇官; Bureau of Rites)
  - June 2 (Tenpō calendar): The Shōkonsai was held at Nishi-no-maru ōhiroma of Edo Castle
  - July 8 (Tenpō calendar): The tasshi by the Jingikan (神祇官; Bureau of Rites) ordered the holding of the Shōkonsai.
  - July 10–11 (Tenpō calendar): The Shōkonsai was held at the Katō Sōrenjo (河東操錬場) in Kyoto.
- 1869
  - July 12 (Tenpō calendar): The tasshi by the Gunmukan ordered the establishment of Tōkyō Shōkonsha
  - July 29: The establishment of Tōkyō Shōkonsha: Emperor Meiji gave Tōkyō Shōkonsha an estate worth 5000 koku (nominally 10,000 koku) as eitai saishiryō (永代祭粢料).
  - July: The 1st Gōshisai (合祀祭) (a festival held for enshrining the war dead together) (Number of newly enshrined: 3,588)
- 1870: The Shōkonsha horse trackrace was established as the first Japanese racetrack in the country along the outside of the shrine approach
- 1872 May 10 (Tenpo calendar): The establishment of the honden
- 1874
  - February: The Japanese invasion of Taiwan (1874)
  - Emperor Meiji paid respect at the Yasukuni shrine. Since then, royal visit had been paid intermittently until 1975
  - August: The 2nd Gōshisai (Number of newly enshrined: 192)
  - November: The 3rd Gōshisai (Number of newly enshrined: 16)
- 1875
  - February 22: Rinjisai (臨時祭; Special festival)
  - February: The 4th Gōshisai (Number of newly enshrined: 12)
  - July: 5th Gōshisai (Number of newly enshrined: 1)
- 1876 January: The 6th Gōshisai (Number of newly enshrined: 1)
- 1877
  - January: The 7th Gōshisai (Number of newly enshrined: 131)
  - February: Seinan War
  - November 14: Rinjisai
  - November: The 8th Gōshisai (Number of newly enshrined: 6,505)
- 1878
  - July: The 9th Gōshisai (Number of newly enshrined: 160)
  - November: The 10th Gōshisai (Number of newly enshrined: 4)
- 1879
  - June 4: The shrine was registered to Bekkaku-kanpeisya and renamed Yasukuni shrine by Dajōan.
  - June: The 11th Gōshisai (Number of newly enshrined: 266)
- 1882
  - February: The inauguration of Yūshūkan military and war museum
  - November: The 12th Gōshisai (Number of newly enshrined: 12)
- 1883 May: The 13th Gōshisai (Number of newly enshrined: 80)
- 1884 November: The 14th Gōshisai (Number of newly enshrined: 47)
- 1885 May: The 15th Gōshisai (Number of newly enshrined: 6)
- 1888
  - May: The 16th Gōshisai (Number of newly enshrined: 607)
  - November: The 17th Gōshisai (Number of newly enshrined: 18)
- 1889
  - May: The 18th Gōshisai (Number of newly enshrined: 1,460)
  - November: The 19th Gōshisai (Number of newly enshrined: 61)
- 1891 November: The 20th Gōshisai (Number of newly enshrined: 1,272)
- 1893 November: The 21st Gōshisai (Number of newly enshrined: 80)
- 1894 August: The First Sino-Japanese War started and continued until April 1895.
- 1895
  - November 17: Rinjitaisai (臨時大祭; Special grand festival)
  - November: The 22nd Gōshisai (Number of newly enshrined: 1,496)
- 1896
  - May 6: Rinjitaisai
  - May: The 23rd Gōshisai (Number of newly enshrined: 143)
  - November: The 24th Gōshisai (Number of newly enshrined: 97)
- 1898
  - November 5: Rinjitaisai
  - November: The 25th Gōshisai (Number of newly enshrined: 11,383)
  - : The closure of the horse racetrack
- 1899
  - May: The 26th Gōshisai (Number of newly enshrined: 340)
  - November: The 27th Gōshisai (Number of newly enshineed: 83)
- 1900
  - May: The 28th Gōshisai (Number of newly enshrined: 35)
  - May: The Boxer Rebellion (to September)
- 1901
  - October 31: Rinjitaisai
  - October: The establishment of the haiden
  - November: 29th Gōshisai (Number of newly enshrined: 1,282)
- 1904
  - February: The Russo-Japanese War (until September 1904)
  - May: The 30th Rinjitaisai
  - May: The 31st Gōshisai (Number of newly enshrined: 30,883)
- 1906
  - May 2: Rinjitaisai
  - May: The 32nd Gōshisai (Number of newly enshrined: 29,960)
- 1907
  - May 3: Rinjitaisai
  - May: The 33rd Gōshisai (Number of newly enshrined: 24,657)
- 1908
  - May 5: Rinjitaisai
  - May: The 34th Gōshisai (Number of newly enshrined: 1,943)
- 1909
  - May 5: Rinjitaisai
  - May: The 35th Gōshisai (Number of newly enshrined: 817)
- 1910
  - May 5: Rinjitaisai
  - May: The 36th Gōshisai (Number of newly enshrined: 141)
- 1911
  - May 5: Rinjitaisai
  - May: The 37th Gōshisai (Number of newly enshrined: 631, Total: 118,499)
- 1914 July: World War I (to October 1918)
- 1919 May: The festival marking the 50th anniversary of the foundation
- 1920 March: The Nikolayevsk Incident
- 1923 September: The Great Kanto earthquake
- 1928 May: The Jinan Incident
- 1931 March: The Shōkonshi (招魂祠) of the Fukuba family was transferred to inside the Yasukuni precinct as Motomiya.
- 1932: The incident between Sophia University (Jochi Daigaku) and the Yasukuni Shrine occurred, when a student refused visit to the Yasukuni shrine with the rest of the school on the ground that it was contrary to his religious convictions.
- 1936: The Congregation for the Evangelization of Peoples (Propaganda Fide) of the Roman Curia issued the Instruction Pluries Instanterque, and approved visit to the Yasukuni shrine as an expression of patriotic motive
- 1938 April: Establishment of the new Shōkonsaitei
- 1937 July: The Second Sino-Japanese War
- 1941 December 8: Pacific War (continued to 1945)
- 1945
  - August 15: Hirohito gave a recorded radio address across the Empire on August 15. In the radio address, called the Gyokuon-hōsō, he announced the surrender of Japan to the Allies.
  - October: The General Headquarters (GHQ) planned to burn down the Yasukuni Shrine and build a dog race course in its place. However, Father Bruno Bitter of the Roman Curia and Father Patrick Byrne of Maryknoll insisted to GHQ that honoring their war dead is the right and duty of citizens everywhere, and GHQ decided not to destroy the Yasukuni shrine.
  - November 19: Rinji Dai-Shōkonsai
  - December: The Shinto Directive
- 1946
  - May 1: The 67th Gōshisai (Number of newly enshrined: 26,969)
  - September: Yasukuni Shrine was registered as a Religious Corporation of Japan.
- 1947
  - The Gōshisai (Number of newly enshrined: 59,337)
  - July 13: The 1st Mitama Matsuri。
- 1951
  - April 3: The enforcement of the Religious Corporation Act
  - October 18: The first Reitaisai after WWII
  - The Roman Curia reconfirmed the Instruction Pluries Instanterque
- 1952 April 28: The Treaty of San Francisco came into force.
- 1955
  - August 14: A memorial service was held for 540 suicide victims after the end of the Pacific war.
  - October 17: Rinjitaisai
- 1956: Gōshisai (Number of newly enshrined: 112,609)
- 1957: Gōshisai (Number of newly enshrined: 470,010)
- 1958: Gōshisai (Number of newly enshrined: 217,536)
- 1959
  - April 8: Rinjitaisai
  - April: Gōshisai (Number of newly enshrined: 346 dead including the class B and C war criminals who died from the death sentence execution)
  - October 4: Gōshisai (Prince Kitashirakawa Yoshihisa and Prince Nagahisa Kitashirakawa)
  - October: Gōshisai (Number of newly enshrined: 479 dead including the class B and C war criminals who died from the death sentence execution)
  - November 5: Taisai (festival) marking the 90th anniversary of the foundation
- 1960 August 15: Asia-Taiheiyō Sensō Junkokusya Kenshō Ireisai (アジア・太平洋戦争殉国者顕彰慰霊祭) (the memorial service to honor the war dead in the Asia-Pacific War)
- 1964 August 15: Holding of a government-sponsored memorial ceremony for Japan's war dead (the ceremony has been held at the Budokan since 1965)
- 1965
  - July: The establishment of Chinreisha
  - October 19: Rinjitaisai
- 1969 October 19: The Taisai (annual main festival) marking the 100th anniversary of the foundation was held, and the Ikōshu (遺稿集) (Collection of literary remains of the war dead in the Greater East Asia War (Pacific War) was issued as a commemorative publication in 1973.
- 1972 March 13: The establishment of Reijibo Hōanden (霊璽簿奉安殿)
- 1975
  - August 15: Takeo Miki became the first prime minister to visit the shrine on August 15, the anniversary of the Japanese surrender. He visited in a solely private capacity and underscored this by not using an official vehicle, bringing other public officials or using his title as prime minister. Similar visits continued without arousing international protests even after the enshrinement of war criminals became publicly known.
  - November 21: Hirohito visited the Yasukuni Shrine. Since then, there has not been another imperial visit to the shrine because of his displeasure over the enshrinement of convicted war criminals.
  - The head-priest at the Honsenji (the Shingon sect Daigo-ha) Junna Nakata hoped that the pontiff Pope Paul VI might say a Mass for the repose of the souls of the 1,618 men condemned as Class A, B and C war criminals, and the Pope promised to say the Mass requested of him but died in 1978 without saying the Mass.
- 1976 June 22: The establishment of the Eirei ni kotaeru kai (英霊にこたえる会; Society for Honoring the Glorious War Dead)
- 1978 October 17: Gōshisai was held to enshrine 14 dead who died from the death penalty execution of the International Military Tribunal for the Far East or died in connection with the Tribunal. Since then, the Yasukuni shrine has used the designation Shōwa Junnansya (昭和殉難者; Martyrs of Shōwa).
- 1980
  - May 22: Pope John Paul II kept Pope Paul VI's word, and the Mass for the fallen civilians and fallen dead worshiped in the shrine including the unofficial 1,618 war criminals of Classes A, B and C took place in St. Peter's Basilica. Nakata attended the Mass, and presented the Pope with an eight-foot high replica of the Daigoji temple's five-story pagoda; inside the replica were memorial tablets Nakata had personally made for all 1,618 war criminals. The Pope blessed the replica pagoda but took no special interest in it.
  - November 16: The establishment of Yasukuni Jinja Hōsankai (靖国神社奉賛会)
- 1985
  - August 15: Prime Minister Yasuhiro Nakasone paid his respects at the Yasukuni shrine, which initiated criticism by People's Republic of China for the first time. The criticism of Nakasone's action was so intense that neither he nor his several immediate successors visited the shrine again.
  - September: The 80th anniversary commemorating and honoring the Russo-Japanese War dead (日露戦争役80年慰霊顕彰祭)
- 1989 January: Taisai (festival) marking the 120th anniversary of the foundation
- 1996 Prime minister Ryutaro Hashimoto paid his respects at the Yasukuni shrine in order to fulfill a promise to a childhood mentor.
- 1998 December: The disbandment of Yasukuni Jinja Hōsankai (靖国神社奉賛会) and reorganization of Yasukuni Jinja Sukei Hōsankai (靖国神社崇敬奉賛会)
- 2001
  - July 18: The Asahi Shimbun reported that the South Korean government was reclaiming spirit tablets of Korean enshrined in the Yasukuni shrine even though Yasukuni shrine houses only Symbolic Registry of Divinities (霊璽簿, Reijibo) (former Saishinbo (祭神簿)) and spirit tablets do not exist.
  - August 13: Prime Minister Junichiro Koizumi, who ran against Ryutaro Hashimoto for the presidency of the Liberal Democratic Party in 2001, made a campaign pledge to visit the shrine on an annual basis regardless of the criticism it would cause, which won him support among nationalists and helped him become prime minister from 2001 to 2006. He paid his respect at the Yasukuni shrine on August 13, 2001, as a Prime Minister for the first time in 5 years since the last Hashimoto's visit. This and following Koizumi's annual visits drew extensive criticism from other East-Asian countries, particularly the People's Republic of China, where the visits stoked anti-Japanese sentiment and influenced power struggles between pro-Japanese and anti-Japanese leaders within the Chinese Communist Party. The Japanese government officially viewed the visits by Koizumi as private visits in an individual capacity to express respect and gratitude to the many people who lost their lives in the war, and not for the sake of war criminals or to challenge the findings of the Tokyo war crimes tribunal.
- 2002
  - April 21: Prime Minister Junichiro Koizumi paid respect at the Yasukuni shrine.
  - July 13: The inauguration of the current Yūshūkan
- 2003 January 14: Prime Minister Junichiro Koizumi paid respect at the Yasukuni shrine.
- 2004
  - January 1: Prime Minister Junichiro Koizumi paid respect at the Yasukuni shrine.
  - September: The establishment of new "Sanshūden"
- 2005
  - January 5: A Yasukuni shrine official said "the shrine has come under intense cyber attack, with its Web site barraged by e-mails believed to come from China since September 2004." The shrine also said on its official web site "These attacks on the Yasukuni Shrine can be taken as not only attacks on the 2.5 million souls who gave their lives for the sake of the country but are also a malicious challenge to Japan. We would like to let the people [of Japan] know the Yasukuni Shrine is under attack, which is a dirty act of terrorism that negates the order of Internet technology and society."
  - June 14: About fifty relatives of the war dead of Taiwan visited the Yasukuni shrine for the ceremony to remove spirits of Taiwanese indigenous soldiers, but canceled it due to sound trucks (gaisensha, 街宣車) and requests from the police.
  - October 12: A brief ceremony attended by priests of the Yasukuni shrine, representatives of the Japanese Ministry of Foreign Affairs and officials from the embassy of South Korea was held, and the Pukkwan Victory Monument Hokkan-Taisyō-Hi (北関大捷碑) was turned over to officials from South Korea, who returned it to its original location, which is now in North Korea.
  - October 17: Prime Minister Junichiro Koizumi paid respect at the Yasukuni shrine.
- 2006
  - August 15: Prime Minister Junichiro Koizumi paid respect at the Yasukuni shrine on August 15 (End of the Pacific War Day) for the first time in 21 years since Former Prime Minister Yasuhiro Nakasone's visit on August 15.
  - October 12: The Motomiya and Chinreisha became open to the public (9 a.m. to 4 p.m.)
- 2007 June 7: Former leader of Taiwan Lee Teng-Hui paid respect at the Yasukuni shrine to honor his senior brother who died as a Japanese soldier.
- 2008 December 24: The Yasukuni official website was cracked by unknown hackers, the homepage content replaced, and the China national flag appeared once during this time.
- 2009 August 11: The Republic of China (Taiwan) Legislative Yuan Aboriginal Atayal member Ciwas Ali and about 50 other Taiwanese indigenous members protested in front of the haiden of Yasukuni Shrine in an effort to remove the enshrined spirits of Taiwanese indigenous soldiers who died fighting for the Japanese army during Pacific War, as well as suing Japanese Prime Minister Junichiro Koizumi for visiting Yasukuni Shrine, and injured Yasukuni officers; then Japanese police officers were dispatched.
- 2010 August 15: Longstanding official visit to the Yasukuni shrine by the ministers of state discontinued until 2012.
- 2011
  - December 26: The shinmon (神門) was set on fire by a Chinese man.
  - May 14 : President of the World Uyghur Congress Rebiya Kadeer visited the Yasukuni Shrine
  - August 15: The Ministry of Land, Infrastructure, Transport and Tourism Yuichiro Hata and the National Public Safety Commission Jin Matsubara (Minister of State for Special Missions) paid respects at the Yasukuni Shrine as state ministers for the first time since the Democratic Party of Japan assumed the reins of government.
- 2013
  - April: The Minister of Finance Tarō Asō, the National Public Safety Commission Keiji Furuya, the Minister for Internal Affairs and Communications Yoshitaka Shindo, and the Minister of State for Regulatory Reform Tomomi Inada paid their respects at the Yasukuni shrine during an annual spring festival ceremony.
  - August 15: Three cabinet members, Keiji Furuya, Yoshitaka Shindo, and Tomomi Inada, paid their respects at the Yasukuni shrine.
  - September 21: A Korean resident of Japan threatened to commit arson at Yasukuni shrine, and was arrested by Police.
  - December 26: Prime Minister Shinzō Abe made a visit to Yasukuni Shrine and Chinreisha. The visit sparked admonition from the Chinese government, which called Abe's visits to Yasukuni "an effort to glorify the Japanese militaristic history of external invasion and colonial rule ... and to challenge the outcome of World War II," as well as regret from Russia. The US embassy in Tokyo said it was disappointed with Abe's actions and that his visit would exacerbate tensions with Japan's neighbours. The United States urged Japan to improve strained relations with neighboring countries in the aftermath of Abe's controversial visit to Yasukuni Shrine. South Korea's culture minister, Yoo Jin-ryong, criticized Abe by saying that his visit "hurts not only the ties between South Korea and Japan, but also fundamentally damages the stability and co-operation in north-east Asia." In an official statement, Abe explained that he wished to "report before the souls of the war dead how my administration has worked for one year and to renew the pledge that Japan must never wage a war again. It is not my intention at all to hurt the feelings of the Chinese and Korean people."
- 2014
  - January: A poll by the conservative-leaning Sankei Shimbun found that only 38.1% of respondents approved of the most recent visit by Abe, while 53% disapproved, a majority of whom cited harm to Japan's foreign relations as their reason. At the same time, 67.7% of respondents said they were not personally convinced by Chinese and Korean criticism of the visit. However, another poll in 2015 by Genron NPO found that 15.7% of respondents disapproved of visits in general by Prime Ministers while 66% of respondents saw no problem, particularly if they were done in private (which was a decrease from 68.2% the year before).
  - April: Canadian singer Justin Bieber paid a visit to the war shrine. After coming under heavy criticism from Chinese and South Korean fans, he apologized for posting a photo of his visit, claiming to have not known about the background surrounding the shrine.
  - August 15: Three cabinet ministers visited the shrine to mark the 69th anniversary of the surrender of Japan in World War II. Prime Minister Shinzo Abe however chose not to.
- 2015
  - November 23: An explosion at a public toilet in the war shrine caused some damage to the ceiling and wall of the bathroom near the south gate of the shrine.
- 2018
  - October 31: Chief priest resigns following his criticism against Emperor.
- 2021
  - August: Chinese actor Zhang Zhehan had taken photos of himself posing in front of cherry blossom in March 2018, having followed the Sakura route suggested by state sponsored news agencies such as People's Network. In August 2021, the background architecture of one of the photos was recognized as Saikan (office area of the Shrine). After the photos became viral and sparked outrage in China, Zhang issued an apology. However, multiple media agencies and majority of people still accused him of betrayal to the national dignity. The photos resulted in 22 brands terminating their endorsements of Zhang. His upcoming films and television shows also terminated all of their associations with him. The China Association of Performing Arts (CAPA) then called for a total entertainment ban on Zhang. Several Chinese music and streaming platforms removed his music, television and film works. Chinese social media platforms Sina Weibo and TikTok deleted his studio and personal accounts.
  - 13 August: Defense Minister Nobuo Kishi visited the shrine making him the first sitting Defense Minister to do so since 2016. The South Korean Foreign Ministry described his visit as "deplorable". The Chinese public condemned his visit, which occurred during the domestic Chinese public and political controversy regarding Chinese actor-singer Zhang Zhehan's photographs.
  - 17 October: Yoshihide Suga visited the shrine two weeks after leaving office as Prime Minister. His successor, Fumio Kishida, donated masakaki ornaments but did not visit.

== Annual celebrations ==
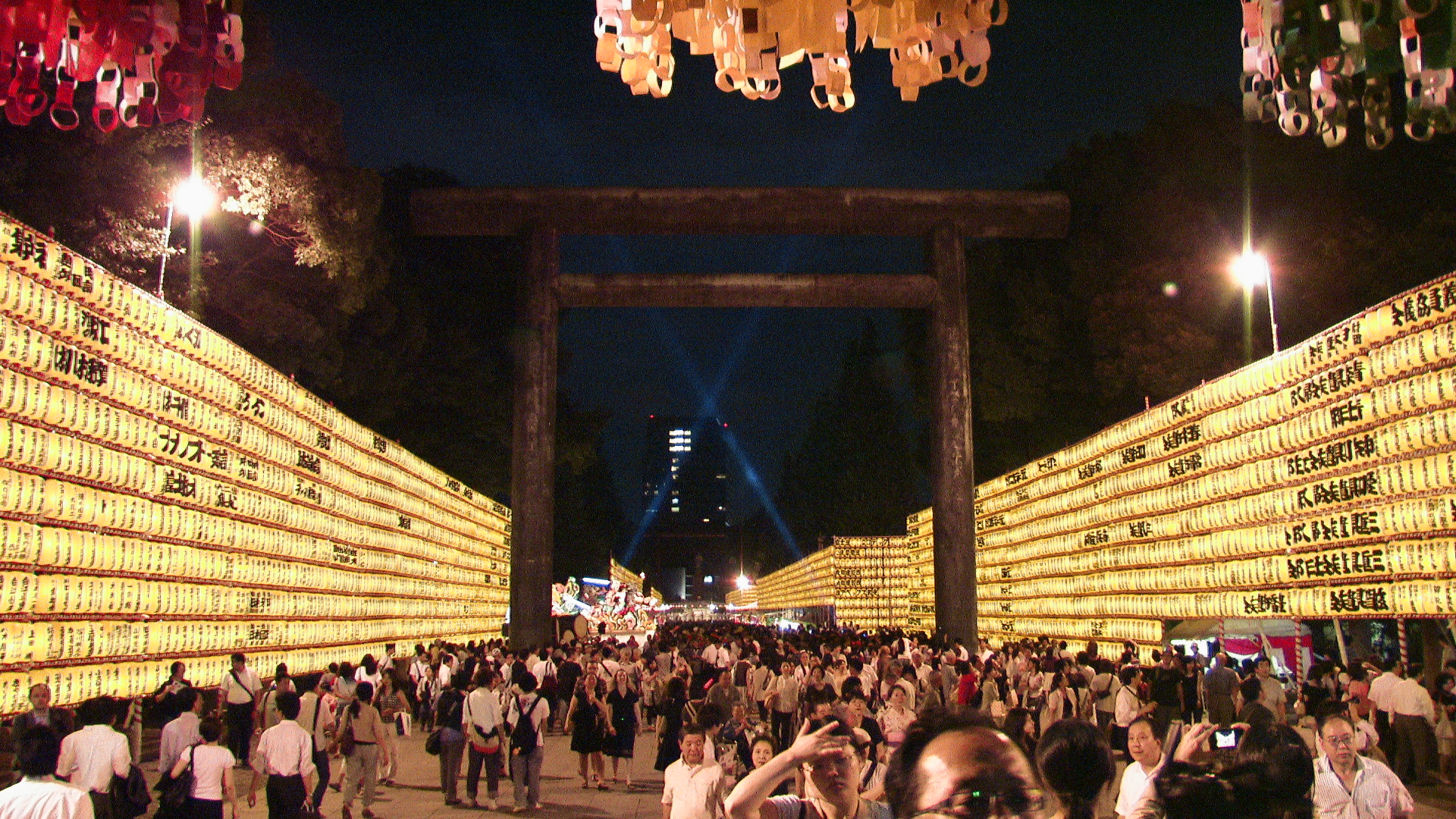
The Mitama Festival at Yasukuni Shrine

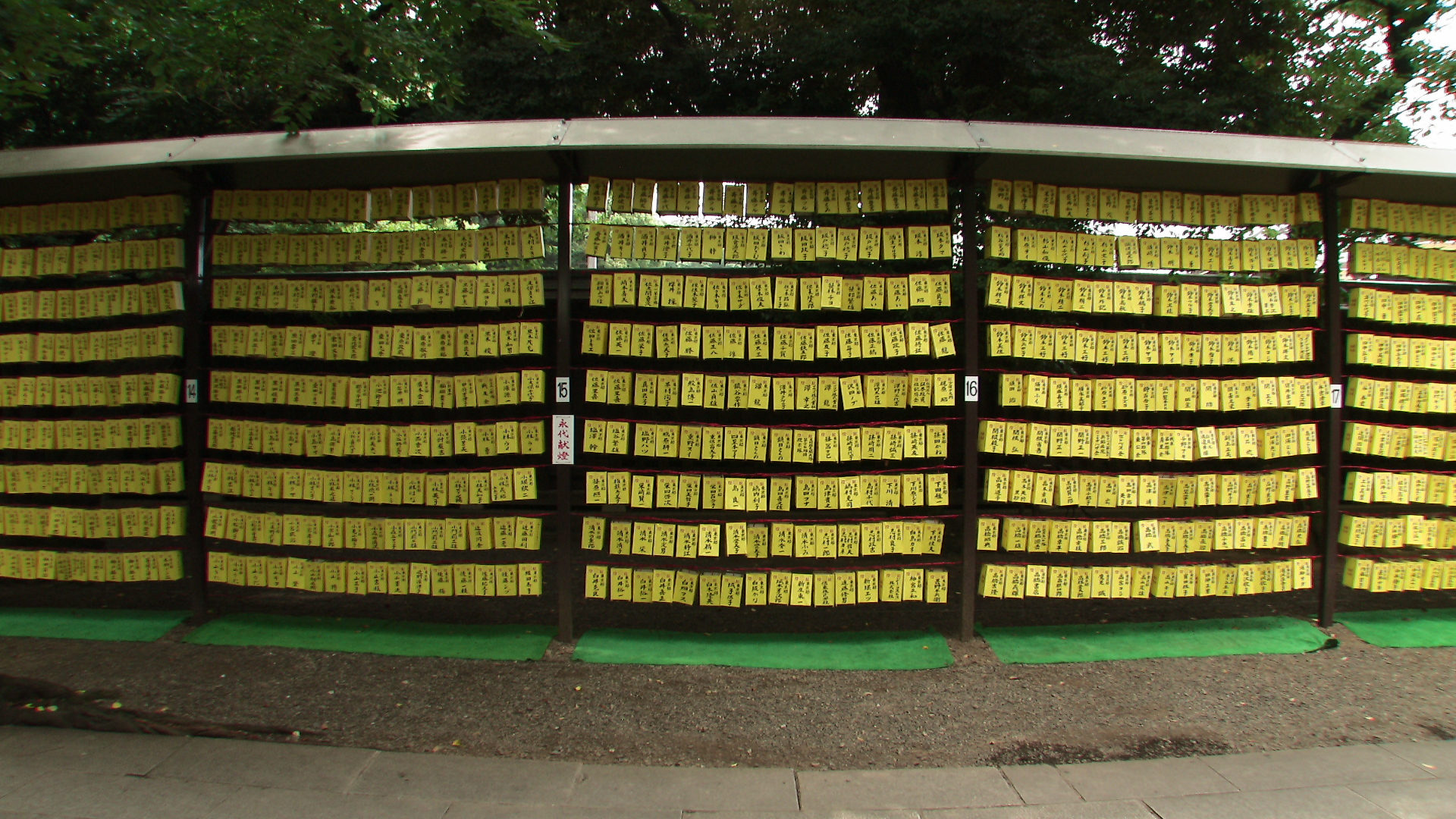
Yasukuni Mitama Lanterns

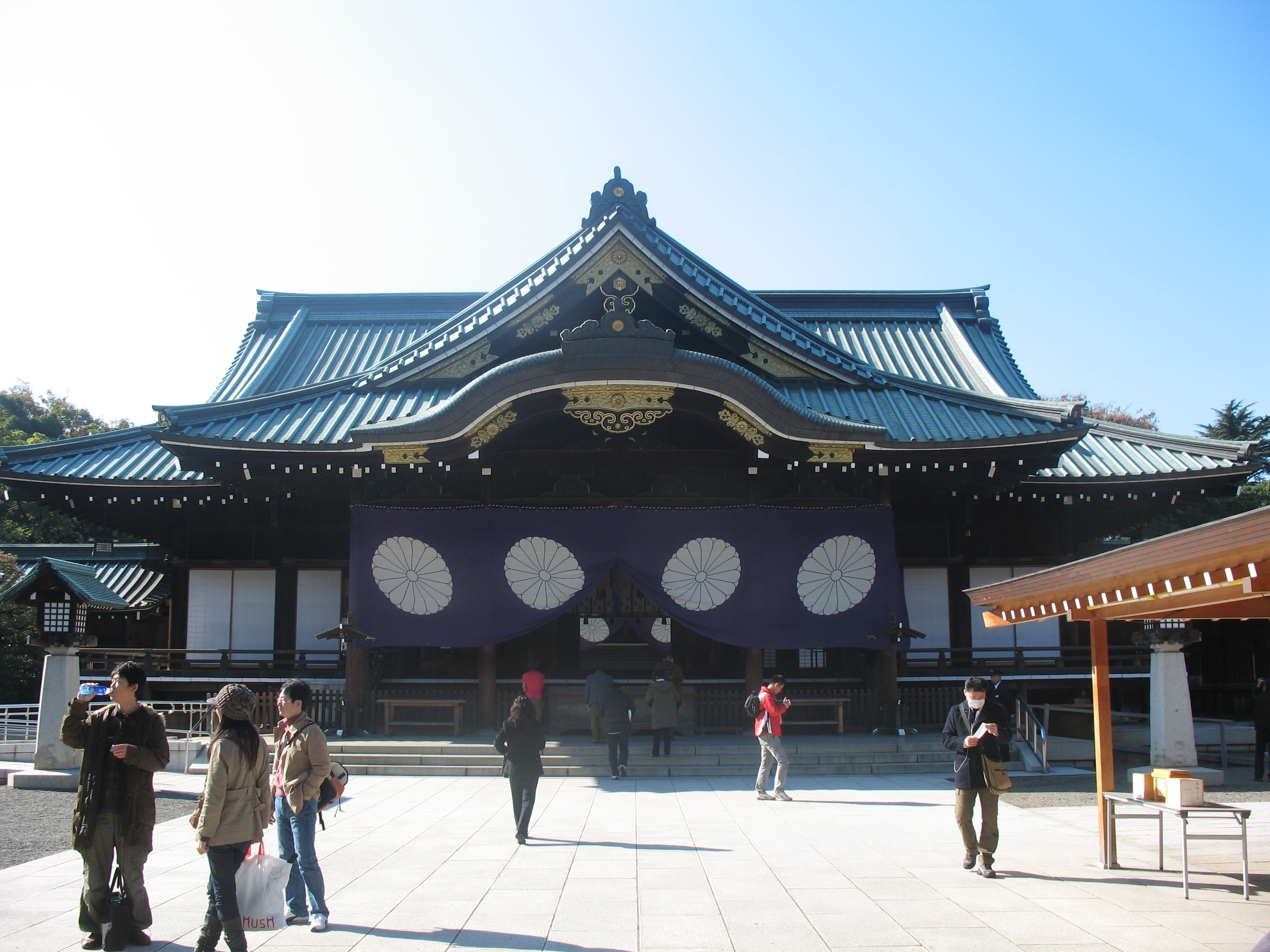
Haiden with purple curtains in the Niinamesai

- January 1:
  - 12 a.m. Wakamizu Hōten (若水奉奠)
  - 8 a.m. Shinnensai (新年祭; New Year's festival)
- January 2: Futsukasai (二日祭)
- January 7: Shōwa-tennō Musashino no Misasagi Yōhai-shiki (昭和天皇 武蔵野陵 遙拝式) (Service of worshipping toward Musashi Imperial Graveyard's Musashino no Misasagi, which is the Imperial mausoleum of the Shōwa Emperor)
- January 30: Kōmei-tennō Nochi no Tsukinowa no Higashi no Misasagi Yōhai-shiki (孝明天皇 後月輪東山陵 遙拝式) (Service of worshipping toward Nochi no Tsukinowa no Higashi no Misasagi, which is the mausoleum of Emperor Kōmei)
- February 11: Kenkoku Kinensai (建國記念祭) (National Foundation Day)—Anniversary of the day on which Japan's first Emperor, Emperor Jimmu, is said to have founded the Japanese nation.
- February 17: Kinensai (祈年祭; spring festival for harvest)
- February 23: Tenno Gotanshin Hoshukusai (天皇御誕辰奉祝祭) (birthday of the current emperor)
- April 21–23: Shunki Reitaisai (春季例大祭; annual spring festival)
  - April 21: Kiyoharai (清祓; Purifying ceremony)
  - April 22: Tojitsusai (当日祭)
  - April 19: Daifutsukasai (第二日祭), Naorai (直会; feast)
- April 29: Shōwasai (昭和祭; Shōwa Festival) — Emperor Shōwa's birthday
- June 29:
  - 10 a.m. Gosoritsu Kinenbisai (御創立記念日祭) (Founding Day) Commemoration of the founding of Yasukuni Jinja
  - 2 p.m. Kenei Hikō-shiki (献詠披講式)
- June 30: Ooharaeshiki (大祓式; Grand Purification Ceremony)
- July 13–16: Mitama Matsuri (みたままつり) (Mitama Festival)— A mid-summer celebration of the spirits of the ancestors. The entry walk is decorated with 40 foot high walls of more than 30,000 lanterns, and thousands of visitors come to pay respects to their lost relatives and friends.
  - July 13: Zenyasai (前夜祭)
  - July 14: Daiichi-yasai (第一夜祭)
  - July 15: Daini-yasai (第二夜祭)
  - July 16: Daisan-yasai (第三夜祭)
- July 30: Meiji Tennō Fushimi Momoyama no Misasagi Yoōhai-shiki (明治天皇 伏見桃山陵 遙拝式) (Service of worshipping toward Fushimi Momoyama no Misasagi, which is the mausoleum of Emperor Meiji)
- October 17: Jingu Kannamesai Yoōhai-shiki (神宮神嘗祭遙拝式) (Service of worshipping toward Ise Jingū Kannamesai)
- October 17–20: Shuki Reitaisai (秋季例大祭) (annual autumn festival)
  - October 17: Kiyoharai (清祓) (Purifying ceremony), Rinjitaisai (臨時大祭)
  - October 18: Tōjitsusai (当日祭)
  - October 19: Daifutsukasai (第二日祭)
  - October 20: Daimikkasai (第三日祭), Naorai (直会) (feast)
- November 3: Meijisai (明治祭) (Emperor Meiji's birthday)
- November 23: Niinamesai (新嘗祭) (Festival of First Fruits)
- December 25: Taishō-tennō Tama-no-Misasagi Yōohai-shiki (大正天皇 多摩陵 遙拝式) (Worship of Tama-no-misasagi for Emperor Taishō), Susuharaishiki (Sweeping soot ceremony)
- December 31: Ooharaeshiki (大祓式) (Grand Purification Ceremony), Joyasai (除夜祭) (Year-End Ritual)
- The first, 11th and 21st day of each month: Tukinamisai (月次祭)
- Every day: Asa Mikesai, (朝御饌祭), Yu Mikesai (夕御饌祭), Eitai Kagurasai (永代神楽祭) (Perpetual Kagura festival), Meinichisai, (命日祭)

== Enshrined deities ==
There are over 2,466,000 enshrined kami (deities) listed in the Yasukuni's Symbolic Registry of Divinities. This list includes soldiers, as well as women and students who were involved in relief operations in the battlefield or worked in factories for the war effort. There are neither ashes nor spirit tablets in the shrine. Enshrinement is not exclusive to people of Japanese descent. Yasukuni has enshrined 27,863 Taiwanese and 21,181 Koreans. Many more kami – those who fought in opposition to imperial Japan, as well as all war dead regardless of nationality – are enshrined at Chinreisha.

=== Eligible categories ===
As a general rule, the enshrined are limited to military personnel who were killed while serving Japan during armed conflicts. Civilians who were killed during a war are not included, apart from a handful of exceptions. A deceased must fall into one of the following categories for enshrinement in the honden:

1. Military personnel, and civilians serving for the military, who were:
  - killed in action, or died as a result of wounds or illnesses sustained while on duty outside the Home Islands (and within the Home Islands after September 1931)
  - missing and presumed to have died as a result of wounds or illnesses sustained while on duty
  - died as a result of war crime tribunals which have been ratified by the San Francisco Peace Treaty
2. Civilians who participated in combat under the military and died from resulting wounds or illnesses (includes residents of Okinawa)
3. Civilians who died, or are presumed to have died, in Soviet labor camps during and after the war
4. Civilians who were officially mobilized or volunteered (such as factory workers, mobilized students, Japanese Red Cross nurses and anti air-raid volunteers) who were killed while on duty
5. Crew who were killed aboard Merchant Navy vessels
6. Crew who were killed due to the sinking of exchange ships (e.g. Awa Maru)
7. Okinawan schoolchildren evacuees who were killed (e.g. the sinking of Tsushima Maru)
8. Officials of the governing bodies of Karafuto Prefecture, Kwantung Leased Territory, Governor-General of Korea and Governor-General of Taiwan

Although new names of soldiers killed during World War II are added to the shrine list every year, no one who was killed due to conflicts after Japan signed the San Francisco Peace Treaty that formally ended World War II in 1951 has been qualified for enshrinement. Therefore, Yasukuni Shrine enshrines individuals who died in service before Japan’s postwar Self-Defense Forces were established, meaning no post-1951 personnel are included.

Enshrinement is carried out unilaterally by the shrine without consultation of surviving family members and in some cases against the stated wishes of the family members. Some families, particularly from South Korea, have petitioned for the removal of their relatives' names, arguing that enshrinement contradicts their loved ones' beliefs.

=== Conflicts ===
Japan has participated in 16 other conflicts since the Boshin War in 1869. The following table chronologically lists the number of people enshrined as kami at the honden (as of October 17, 2004) from each of these conflicts.

Conflict	Description	Year(s)	Number of enshrined	Notes
Boshin War and Meiji Restoration	Japanese civil war	1867–1869	7,751	
Satsuma Rebellion	Japanese civil war	1877	6,971	
Taiwan Expedition of 1874	Conflict with the Paiwan people (Taiwanese aborigines)	1874	1,130	
Ganghwa Island incident	Conflict with the Joseon Army	1875	2	
Imo Incident	Conflict with the Joseon Rebel Army over Korea	1882	14	
Gapsin Coup	a failed 3-day coup d'état in the late Joseon Dynasty of Korea	1884	6	
First Sino-Japanese War	Conflict with Qing China over Korea	1894–95	13,619	
Boxer Uprising	Eight-Nation Alliance's invasion of China	1901	1,256	
Russo-Japanese War	Conflict with the Russian Empire over Korea and Manchuria	1904–05	88,429	
World War I	Conflict with the German Empire (Central Powers) over the Mediterranean Sea and Shandong, a Chinese province	1914–1918	4,850	
Battle of Qingshanli	Conflict with the Korean Independence Army over Korea	1920	11	
Jinan Incident	Conflict with the Kuomintang of China over Jinan, the capital of Shandong province	1928	185	
Musha Incident	The last major Aboriginal uprising against colonial Japanese forces in Taiwan	1930	Unknown	
Nakamura Incident	The extrajudicial killing of Imperial Japanese Army Captain Shintarō Nakamura and three others, on 27 June 1931 by Chinese soldiers in Manchuria	1931	19	
Mukden Incident	Leading to the occupation of Manchuria	1931–1937	17,176	
Second Sino-Japanese War	Conflict with China	1937–1941	191,250	
World War II Pacific theatre (including Indochina War)	Conflict with the Allied forces and involvement in the Pacific theater (including Class A, B, & C War Criminals, and Forced labor of Japanese in the Soviet Union) (Conflict with France)	1941–1945; 1945–	2,133,915	
		Total	2,466,584	

The shrine enshrines those who fought on behalf of the imperial government but does not include members of the Tokugawa shogunate forces or rebel factions from the Boshin War and Satsuma Rebellion. They are enshrined at Chinreisha.

== Precinct ==
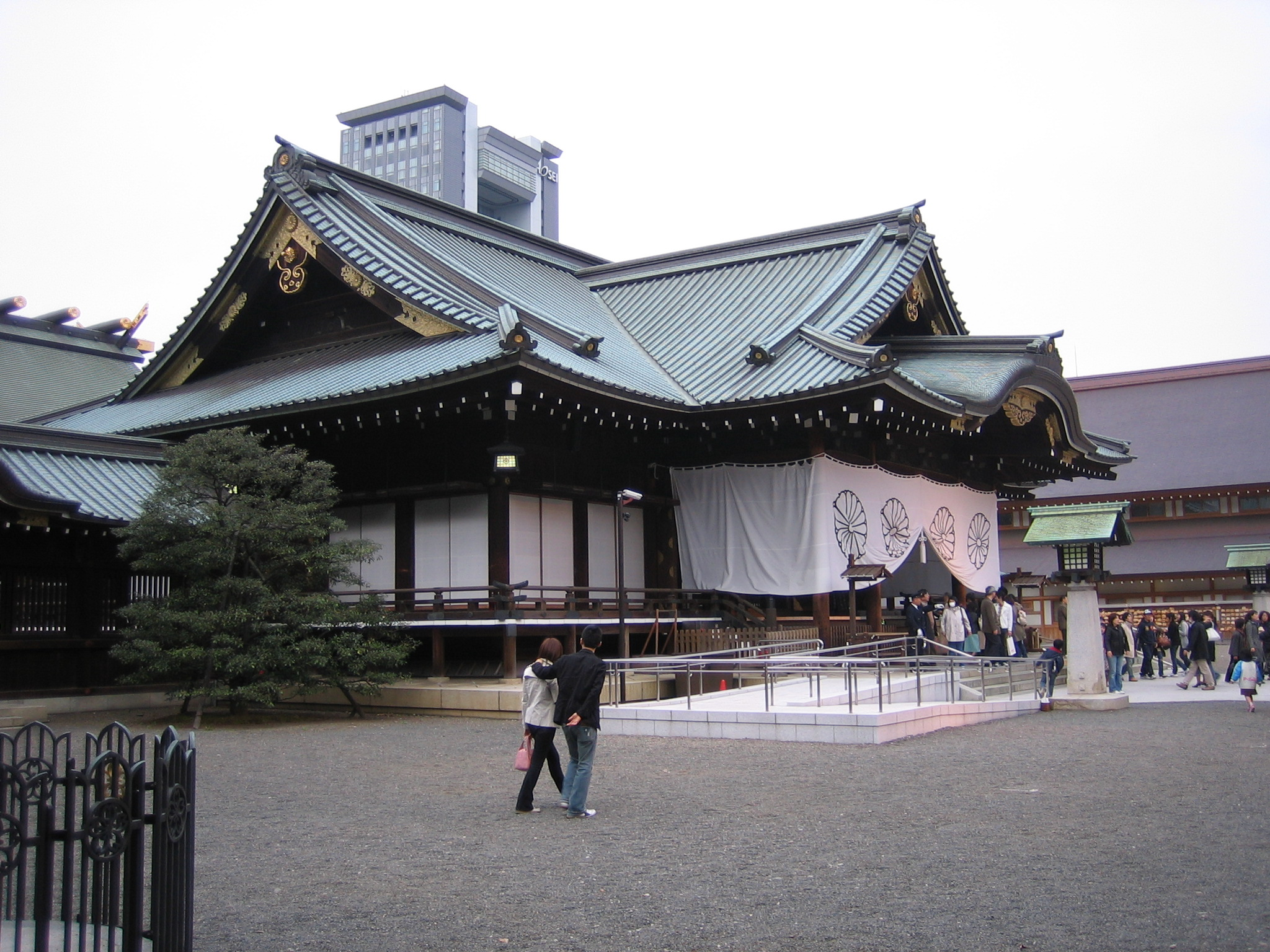
Yasukuni Shrine's haiden

There are a multitude of facilities within the 6.25 hectare grounds of the shrine, as well as several structures along the 4 hectare causeway. Though other shrines in Japan also occupy large areas, Yasukuni is different because of its recent historical connections. The Yūshūkan museum is just the feature that differentiate Yasukuni from other Shinto shrines. The following lists describe many of these facilities and structures.

=== Shrine structures ===
On the shrine grounds, there are several important religious structures. The shrine's haiden, Yasukuni's main prayer hall where worshipers come to pray, was originally built in 1901 in styles of Irimoya-zukuri, Hirairi, and Doubanbuki (copper roofing) in order to allow patrons to pay their respects and make offerings. This building's roof was renovated in 1989. The white screens hanging off the ceiling are changed to purple ones on ceremonial occasions.

The honden is the main shrine where Yasukuni's enshrined deities reside. Built in 1872 and refurbished in 1989, it is where the shrine's priests perform Shinto rituals. The building is generally closed to the public.

The building located on the right side of haiden is the Sanshuden (参集殿) (Assembly Hall), which was rebuilt in 2004. Reception and waiting rooms are available for individuals and groups who wish to worship in the Main Shrine.

The building located directly behind the Sanshuden is the Tochakuden (到着殿) (Reception Hall).

The building located directly behind the honden is known as the Reijibo Hōanden (霊璽簿奉安殿) (Repository for the Symbolic Registers of Divinities) built in styles of Kirizuma-zukuri, Hirairi, and Doubanbuki. It houses the Symbolic Registry of Divinities (霊璽簿, Reijibo)—a handmade Japanese paper document that lists the names of all the kami enshrined and worshiped at Yasukuni Shrine. It was built of quakeproof concrete in 1972 with a private donation from Emperor Shōwa.

In addition to Yasukuni's main shrine buildings, there are also two peripheral shrines located on the precinct. Motomiya (元宮) is a small shrine that was first established in Kyoto by sympathizers of the imperial loyalists that were killed during the early weeks of the civil war that erupted during the Meiji Restoration. Seventy years later, in 1931, it was moved directly south of Yasukuni Shrine's honden. Its name, Motomiya ("Original Shrine"), references the fact that it was essentially a prototype for the current Yasukuni Shrine. The second peripheral shrine is the Chinreisha. This small shrine was constructed in 1965, directly south of the Motomiya. It is dedicated to those not enshrined in the honden—those killed by wars or incidents worldwide, regardless of nationality. It has a festival on July 13.

=== Torii and Mon (gates) ===
There are several different torii and mon (門) gates located on both the causeway and shrine grounds. When moving through the grounds from east to west, the first torii visitors encounter is the Daiichi Torii (Ōtorii). This large steel structure was the largest torii in Japan when it was first erected in 1921 to mark the main entrance to the shrine. It stands approximately 25 meters tall and 34 meters wide and is the first torii. The current iteration of this torii was erected in 1974 after the original was removed in 1943 due to weather damage. This torii was recently repainted.

The Daini Torii (Seidō Ōtorii) is the second torii encountered on the westward walk to the shrine. It was erected in 1887 to replace a wooden one which had been erected earlier. This is the largest bronze torii in Japan. Immediately following the Daini Torii is the shinmon (神門). A 6-meter tall hinoki cypress gate, it was first built in 1934 and restored in 1994. Each of its two doors bears a Chrysanthemum Crest measuring 1.5 meters in diameter. West of this gate is the Chumon Torii (中門鳥居) (Third Shrine Gate), the last torii visitors must pass underneath before reaching Yasukuni's haiden. It was recently rebuilt of cypress harvested in Saitama Prefecture in 2006.

In addition to the three torii and one gate that lead to the main shrine complex, there are a few others that mark other entrances to the shrine grounds. The Ishi Torii is a large stone torii located on the south end of the main causeway. It was erected in 1932 and marks the entrance to the parking lots. The Kitamon and Minamimon are two areas that mark the north and south entrances, respectively, into the Yasukuni Shrine complex. The Minamimon is marked by a small wooden gateway.

Torii and Mon (Gates)

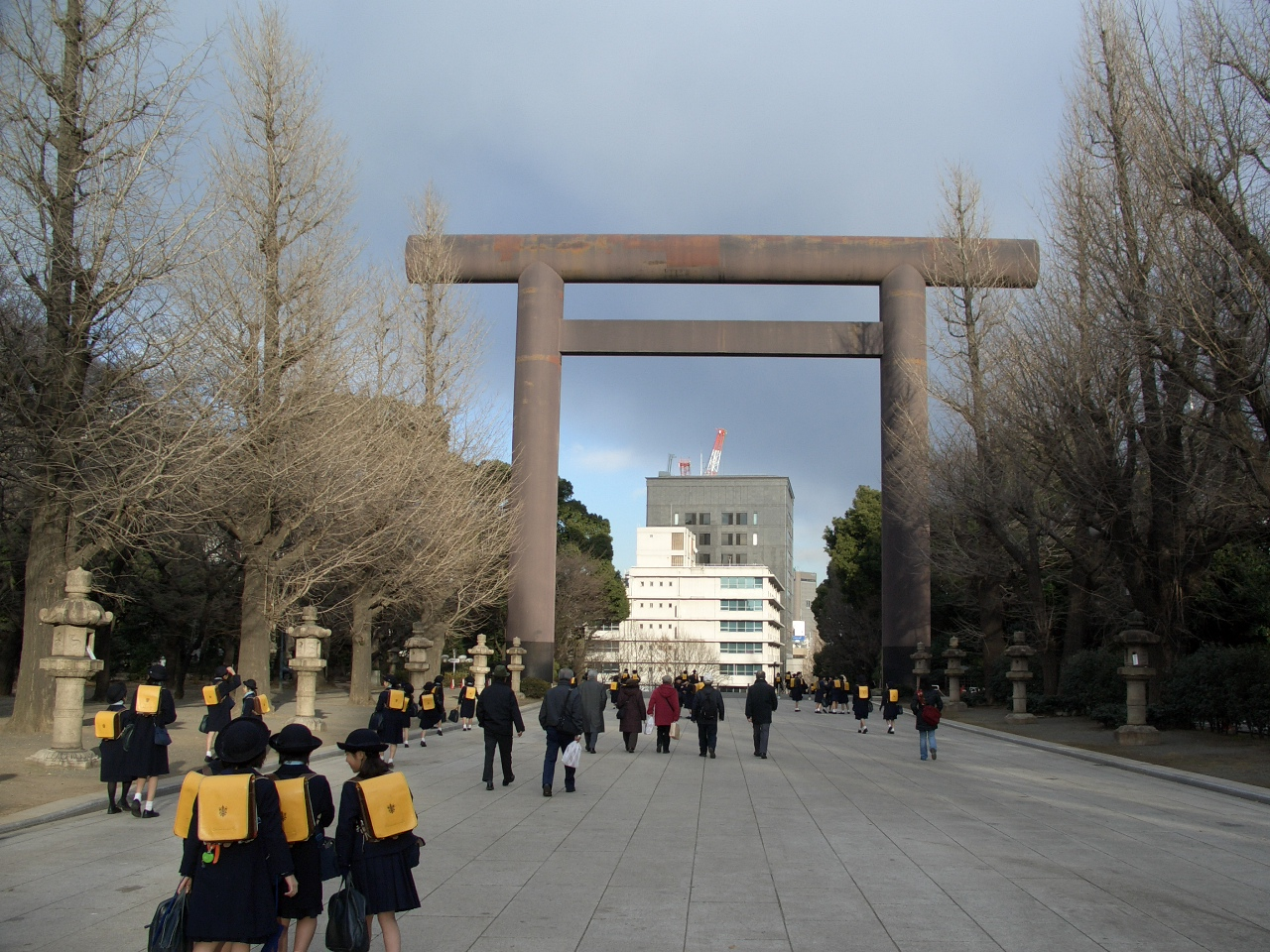
Daiichi Torii (Great Gate)

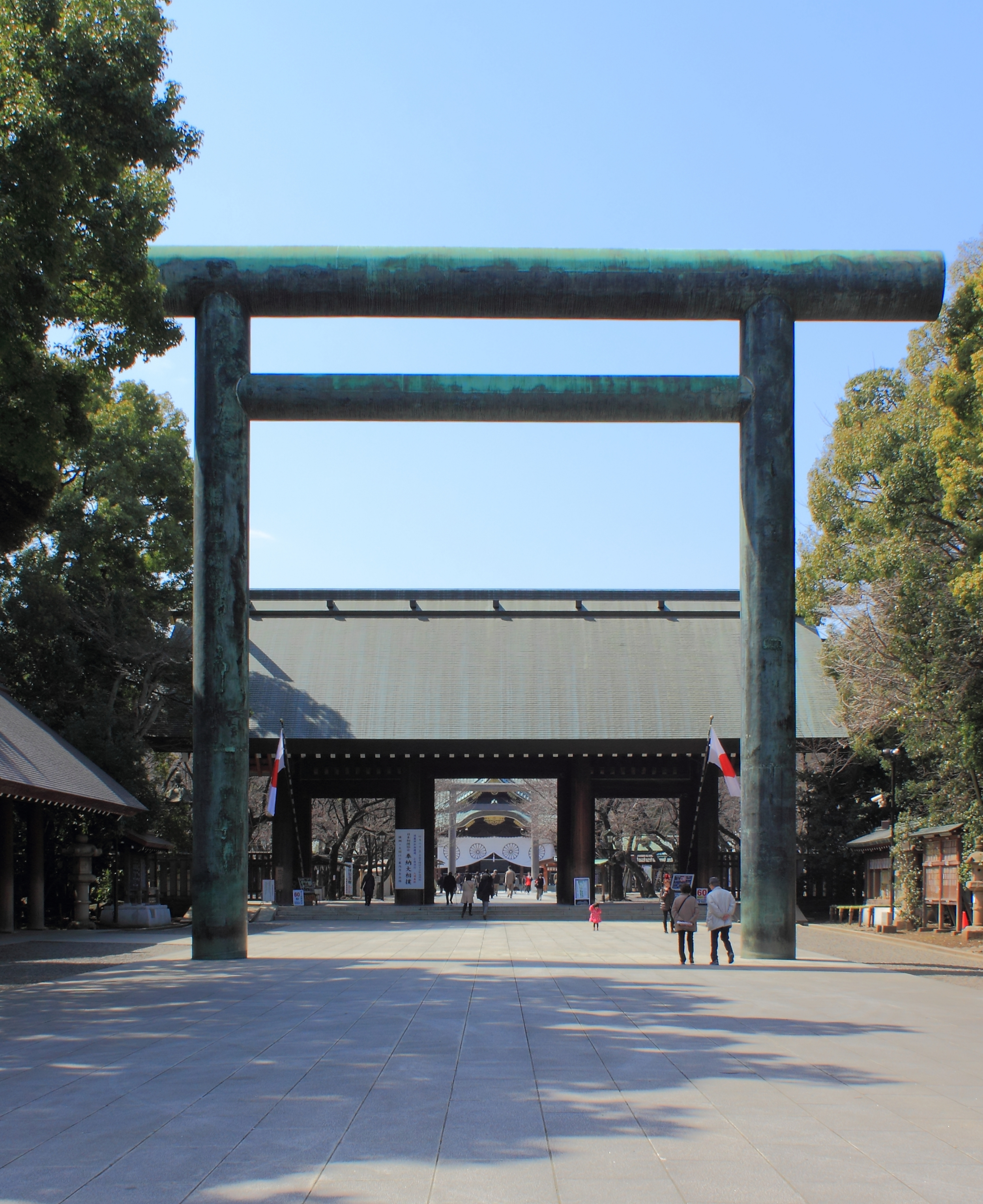
Daini Torii

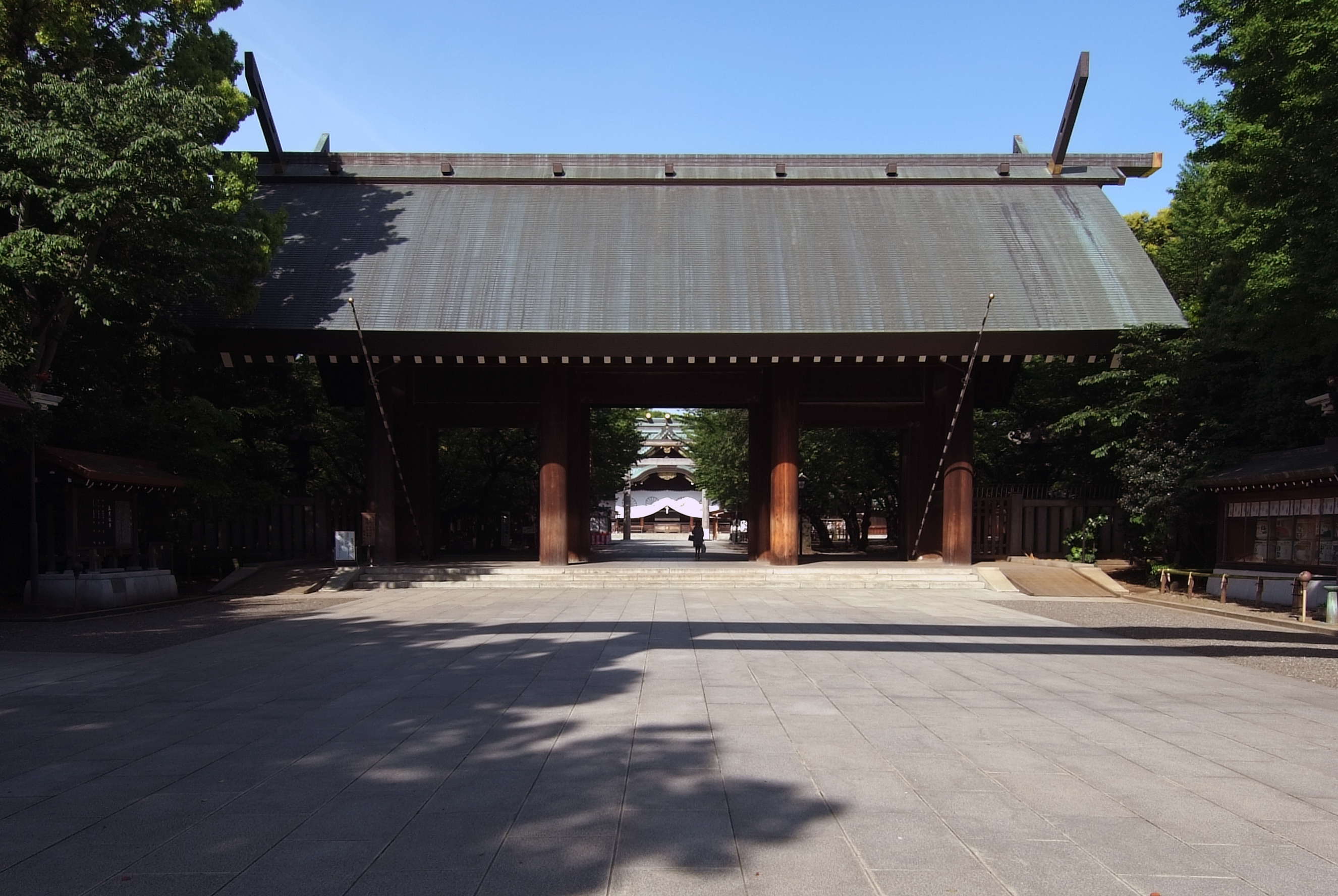
Shinmon

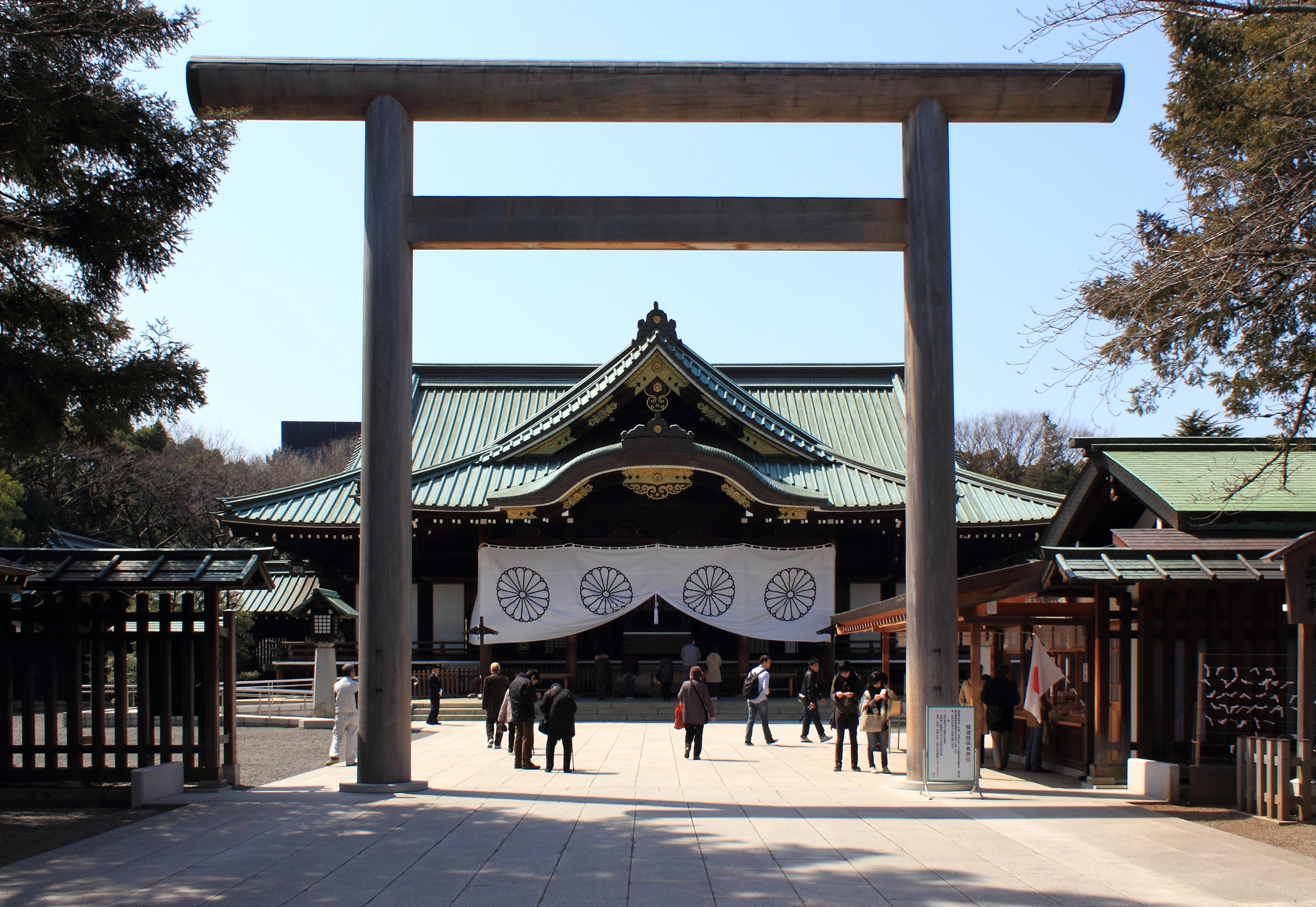
Chumon Torii

=== Memorials ===
- Irei no Izumi (Soul-Comforting Spring): This modern looking monument is a spring dedicated to those who suffered from or died of thirst in battle.
- Statue of War Widow with Children: This statue honors the mothers who raised children in the absence of fathers lost at war. It was donated to the shrine in 1974 by these mothers' children.
- Statue of Kamikaze Pilot: A bronze statue representing a kamikaze pilot stands to the left of the Yūshūkan's entrance. A small plaque to the left of the statue was donated by the Tokkōtai Commemoration Peace Memorial Association in 2005. It lists the 5,843 men who died while executing suicide attacks against Allied naval vessels in World War II.
- Statue of Ōmura Masujirō: Created by Okuma Ujihiro in 1893, this statue is Japan's first Western-style bronze statue. It honors Ōmura Masujirō, a man who is known as the "Father of the Modern Japanese Army."
Memorial Statues

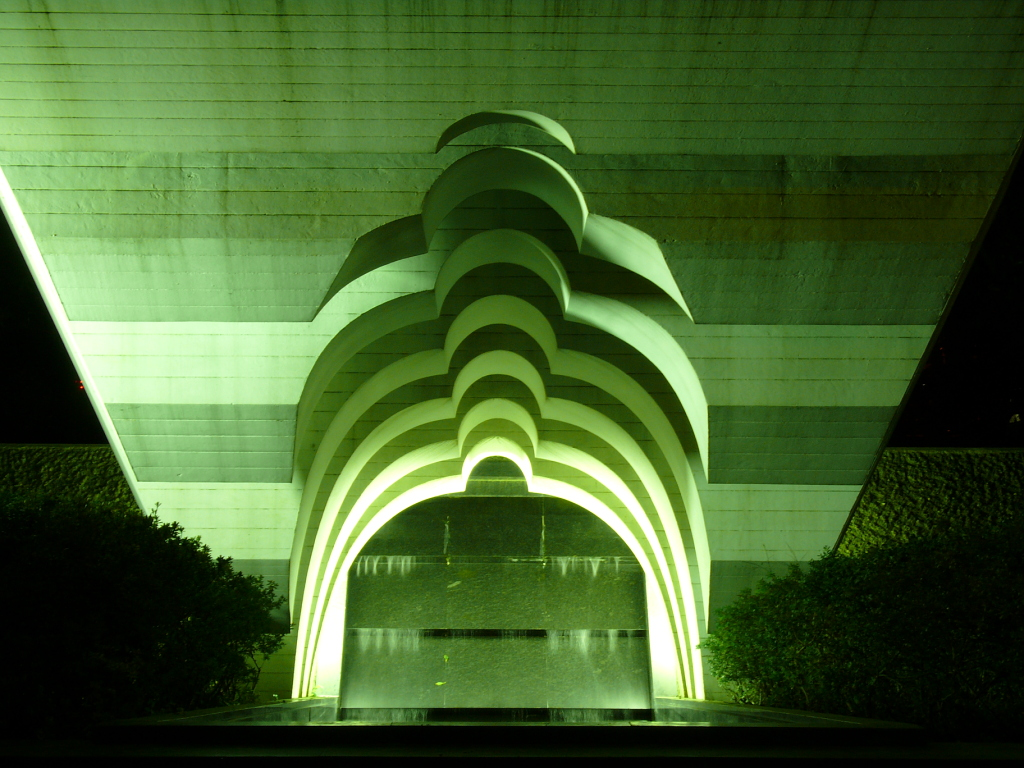
Irei no Izumi Sculpture

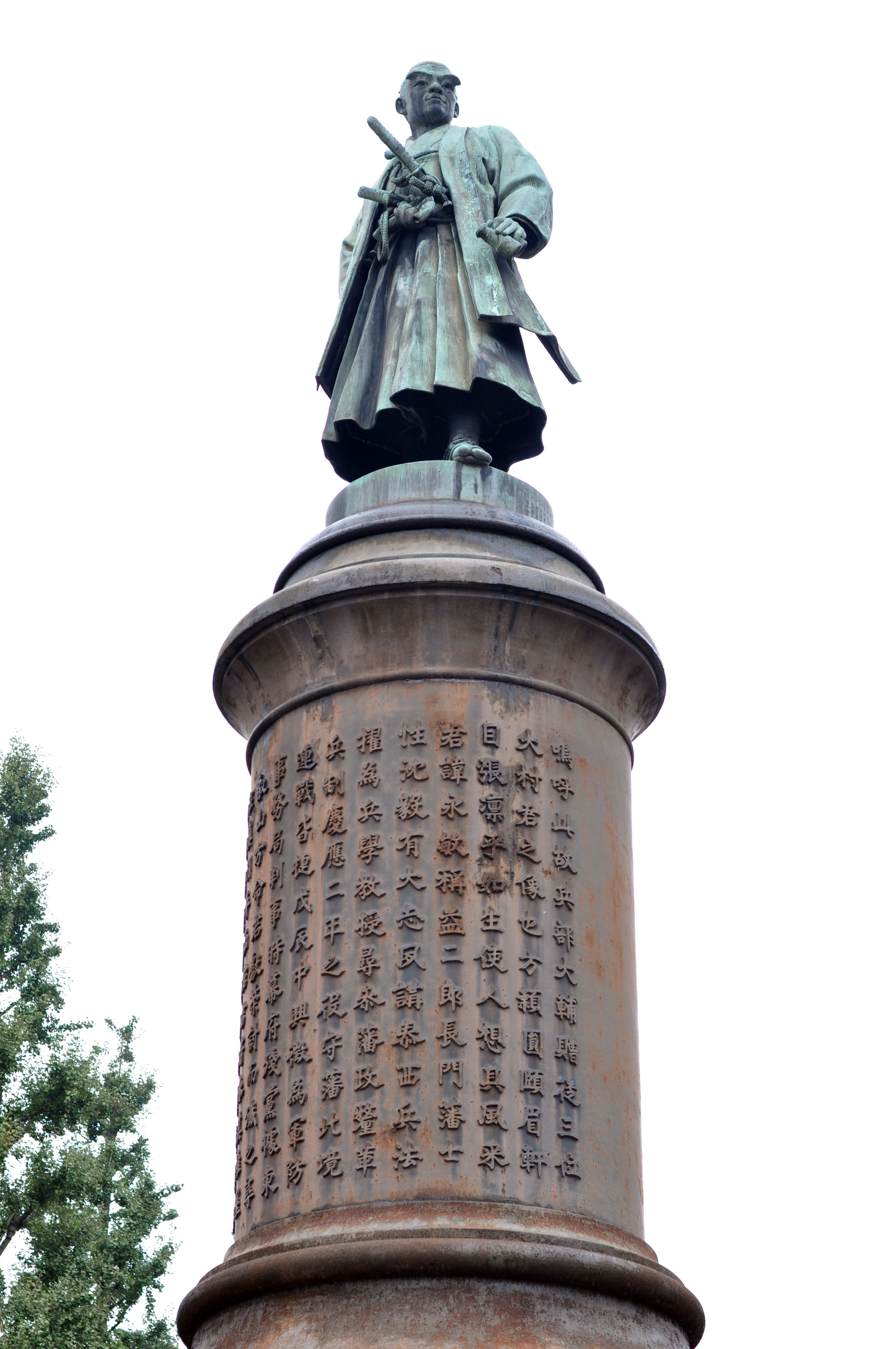
Ōmura Masujirō

- Monument of Justice Radhabinod Pal: This newer monument was erected at Yasukuni Shrine in 2005. It honours Indian jurist Radhabinod Pal, the lone justice on the International Military Tribunal for the Far East's trials of Japanese war crimes committed during World War II to find all the defendants not guilty. On April 29, 2005, Indian Prime Minister Manmohan Singh told his counterpart Koizumi Junichiro that "the dissenting judgement of Justice Radha Binod Pal is well known to the Japanese people and will always symbolise the affection and regard our people have for your country."
- Statues honoring horses, carrier pigeons and dogs killed in war service: These three life-sized bronze statues were all donated at different times during the second half of the 20th century. The first of the three that was donated, the horse statue was placed at the Yasukuni Shrine in 1958 to honor the memory of the horses that were utilized by the Japanese military. Presented in 1982, the statue depicting a pigeon atop a globe honors the homing pigeons of the military. The last statue, donated in March 1992, depicts a German Shepherd and commemorates the soldiers' canine comrades. Opened, full bottles of water are often left at these statues.
- Hitachimaru Junnan Kinenhi (常陸丸殉難記念碑) (Monument for the dead in Hitachi Maru Incident)
- Tanaka Shitai Chukonhi (田中支隊忠魂碑) (Monument of Tanaka squad)
- Shugo Kenpei no Hi (守護憲兵之碑) (Monument of Kempeitai (Military police corps))
- Gunjin Chokuyu no Hi (軍人勅諭の碑) (Monument of Imperial Rescript to Soldiers and Sailors, which is a Shōchoku (imperial edict) and code of ethics that Emperor Meiji issued to soldiers of the army and the navy on January 4, 1882)
Memorial Statues

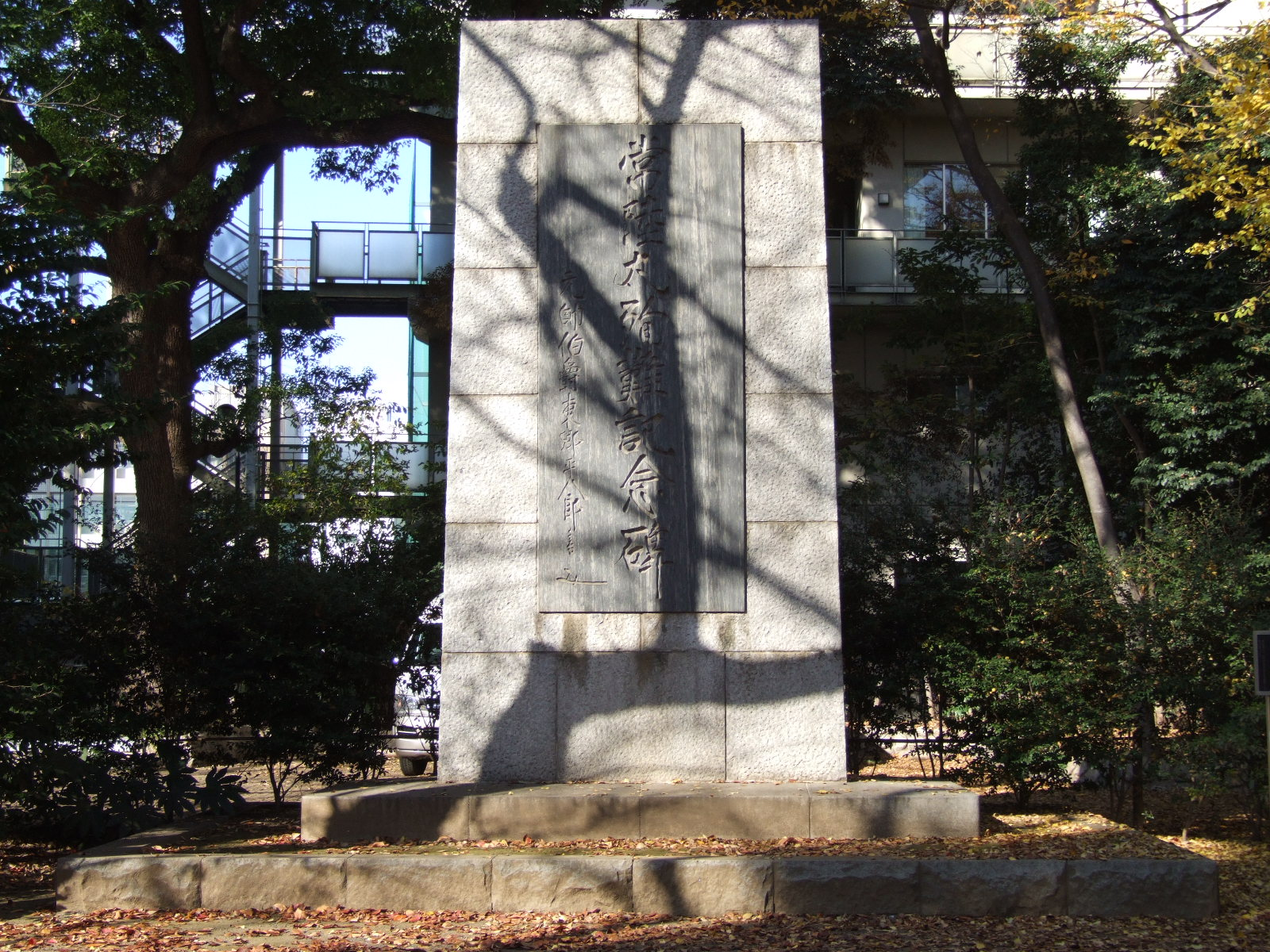
Hitachimaru Junnan Kinenhi

=== Other buildings and structures ===
- Syagō Hyō (社号標) (Stone pillar on which the shrine name is engraved)
- Sazareishi (さざれ石) – near the Daiichi Torii
- Red stone – near the Daiichi Torii
- Senseki no ishi (戦跡の石) (The stone of battle site)
- Takatōrō (高燈籠) (Tall lantern) – the largest tōrō in Japan
- Ōtemizusha (大手水舎) – Ōtemizusha, which means large temizuya (main purification font), was established in 1940.
- Dovecote (shirohato kyusha): Almost 300 white doves live and are bred in a special dovecote located on the grounds of Yasukuni Shrine.
- Kitamon (北門) (North gate)
- Nōgakudo (Noh Theater): Originally built in Shiba Park, Tokyo in 1881, and moved to Yasukuni Shrine in 1903. Noh dramas and traditional Japanese dance are performed on its stage in honor of the resident divinities.
- Saikan (Purification Retreat) Shamusho (Shrine Office) (斎館社務所)
- Yasukuni Kaikan formerly Kokuboukan (靖國会館; 旧「国防館」)
- Yasukuni Kaikō Bunko (靖国偕行文庫) (Yasukuni Archives): Opened on October 7, 1999, archives more than 100,000 volumes including reference material that describes the circumstances under which the divinities enshrined in Yasukuni Shrine died, as well as source material for research on modern history.
- Yūshūkan: Originally built in 1882, this museum is located to the north of the main hall. Its name is taken from a saying – "a virtuous man always selects to associate with virtuous people." The building was repaired and expanded in 2002. The museum is a facility to stores and exhibit relics, and it also houses the weaponry of the Imperial Japanese Navy, notably including a Zero Fighter plane and Kaiten suicide torpedo. The museum has come into great controversy owing to its revisionist depiction of Japanese history, particularly of the militarist period from 1931 to 1945, in which it is perceived as denying Japanese war crimes and glorifying Japan's militarist past.
- Shinchi Teien (神池庭園): This Japanese style strolling garden was created in the early Meiji Era. Its centerpiece is a small waterfall located in a serene pond. It was refurbished in 1999.
- Sumo Ring (Sumōjō (相撲場)): In 1869, a sumo wrestling exhibition was held at Yasukuni Shrine in order to celebrate the shrine's establishment. Since then, exhibitions involving many professional sumo wrestlers, including several grand champions (yokozuna) take place at the Spring Festival almost every year. The matches are free of charge.
- Shōkonsaitei (招魂斎庭)
- Senshintei (洗心亭) (Teahouse)
- Seisentei (靖泉亭) (Teahouse)
- Kōuntei (行雲亭) (Teahouse): The Kōuntei is used as a tea ceremony school room by the Urasenke from Monday to Saturday, and was used for manufacturing the Yasukuni (Kudan) sword before World War II.
- Yasukuni Tokeidai (靖国の時計台) (Yasukuni clock tower)

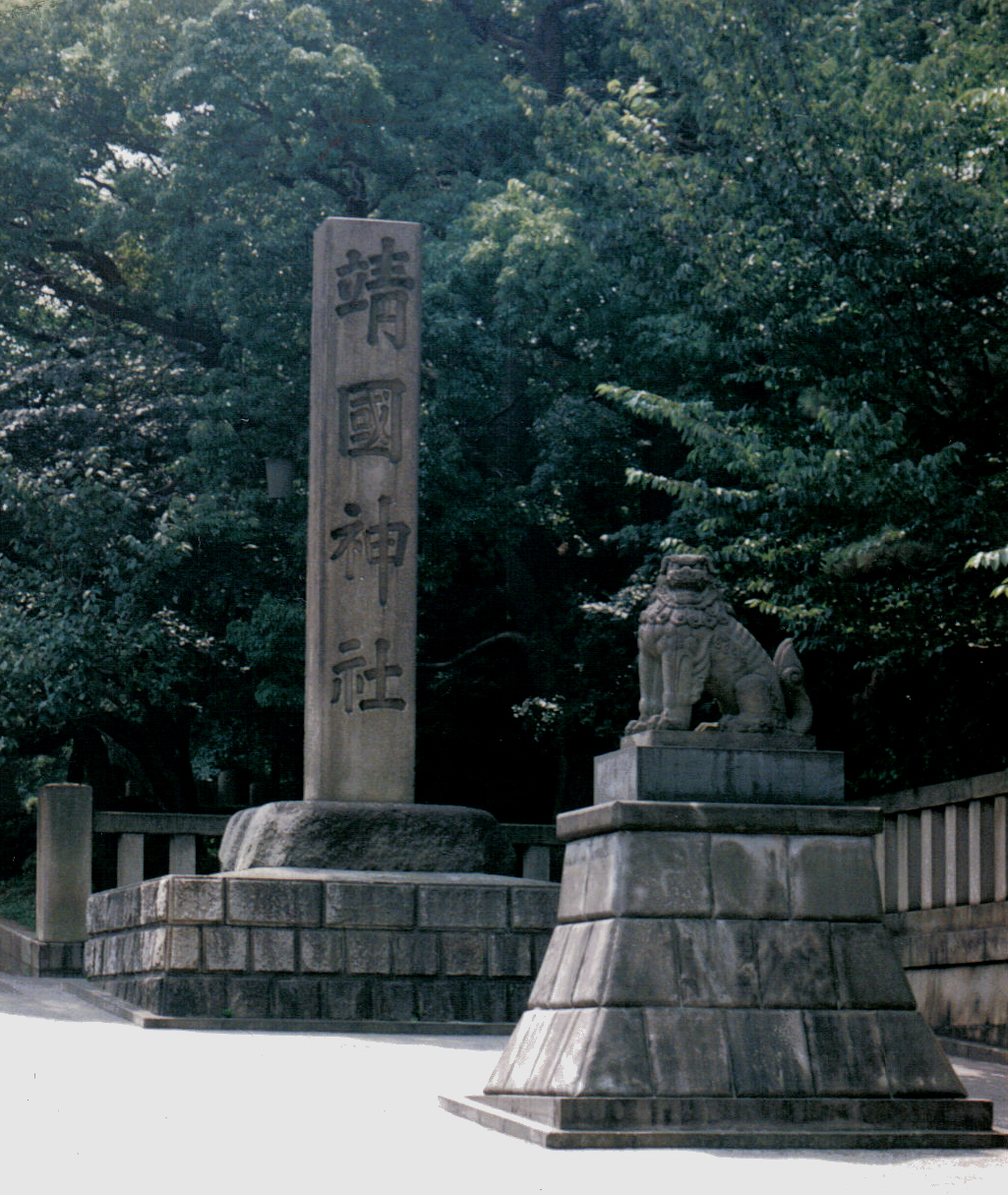
Syagō Hyō

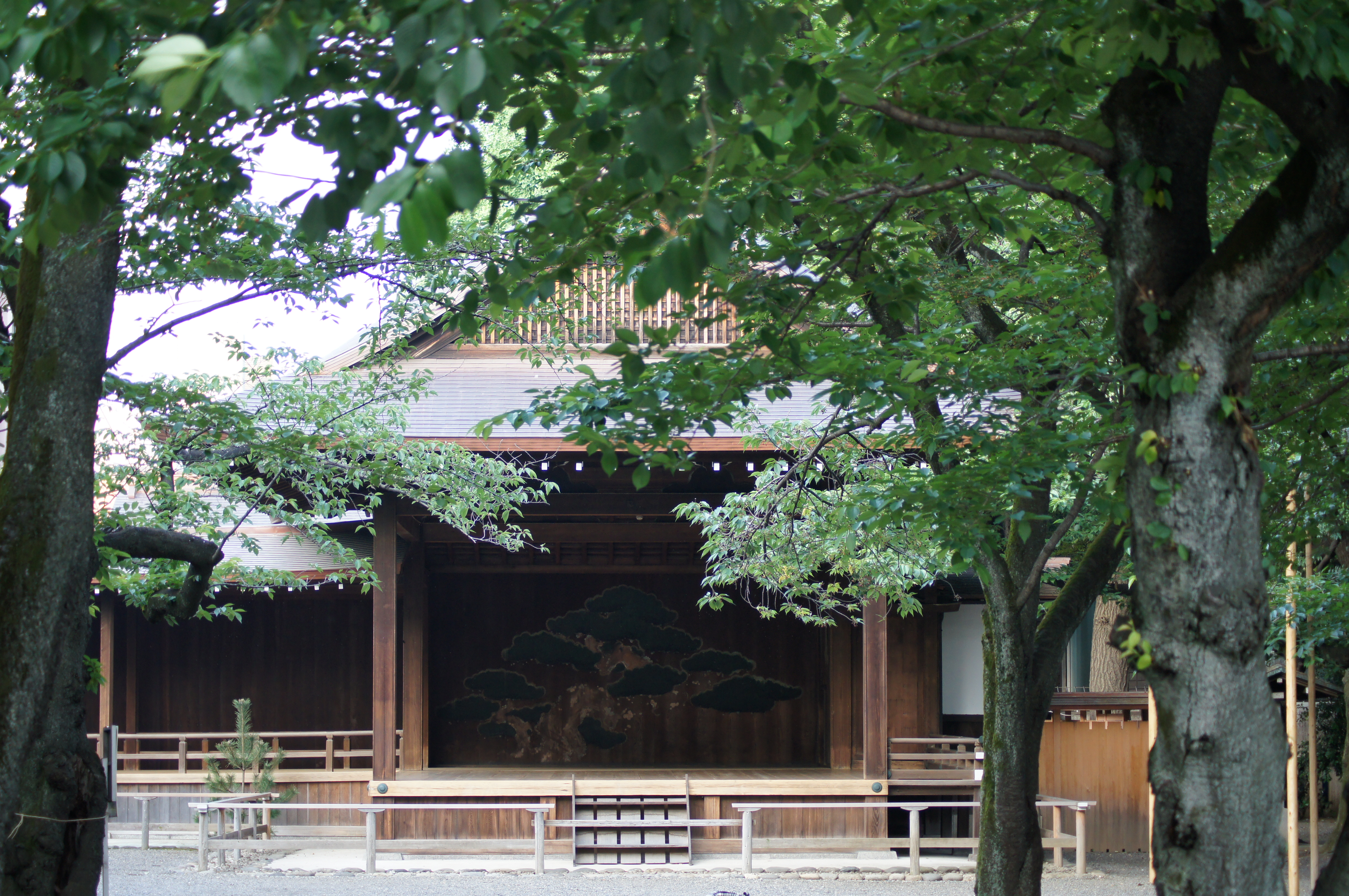
Nōgakudo

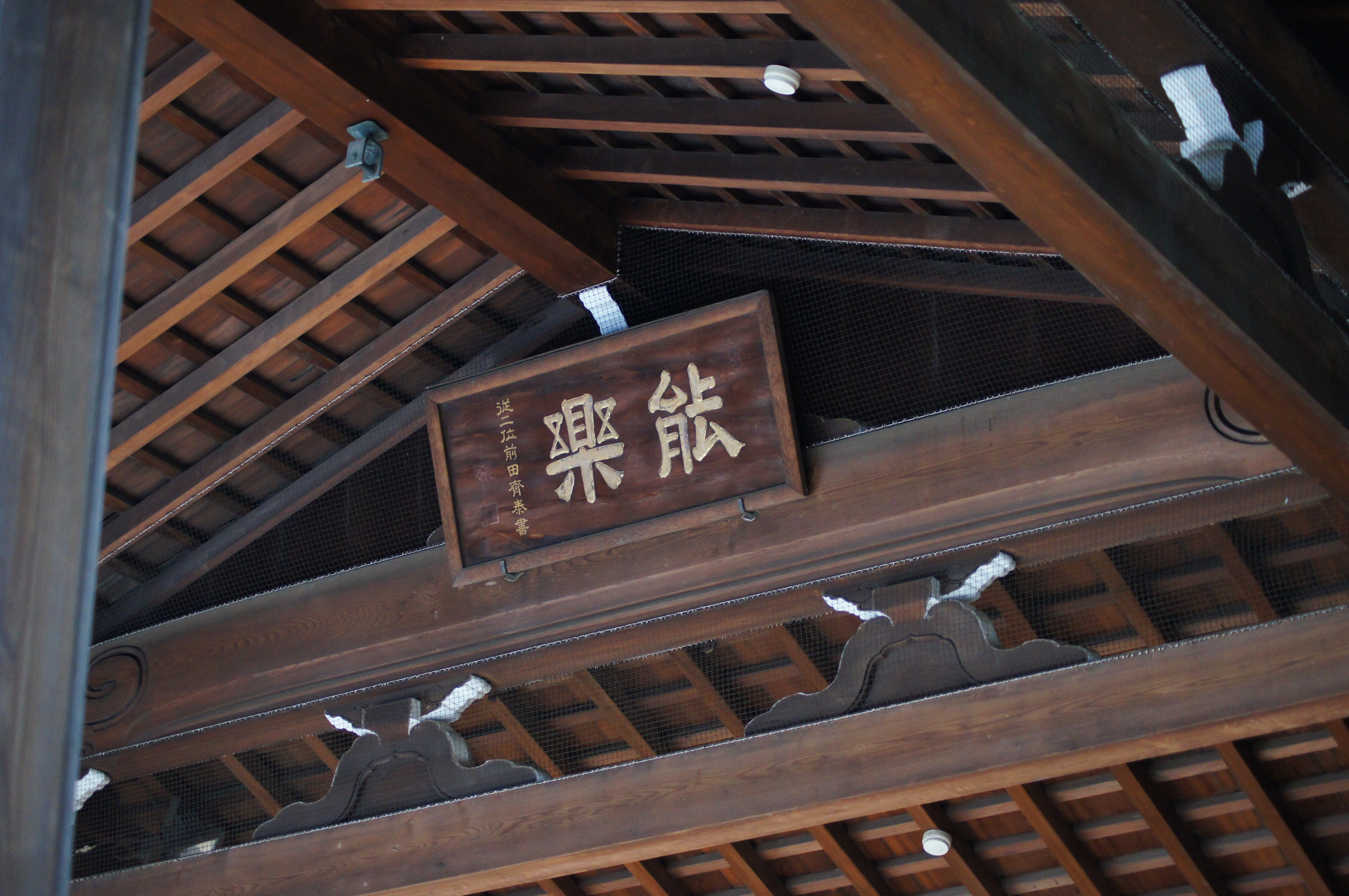
The nameboard of Nōgakudo

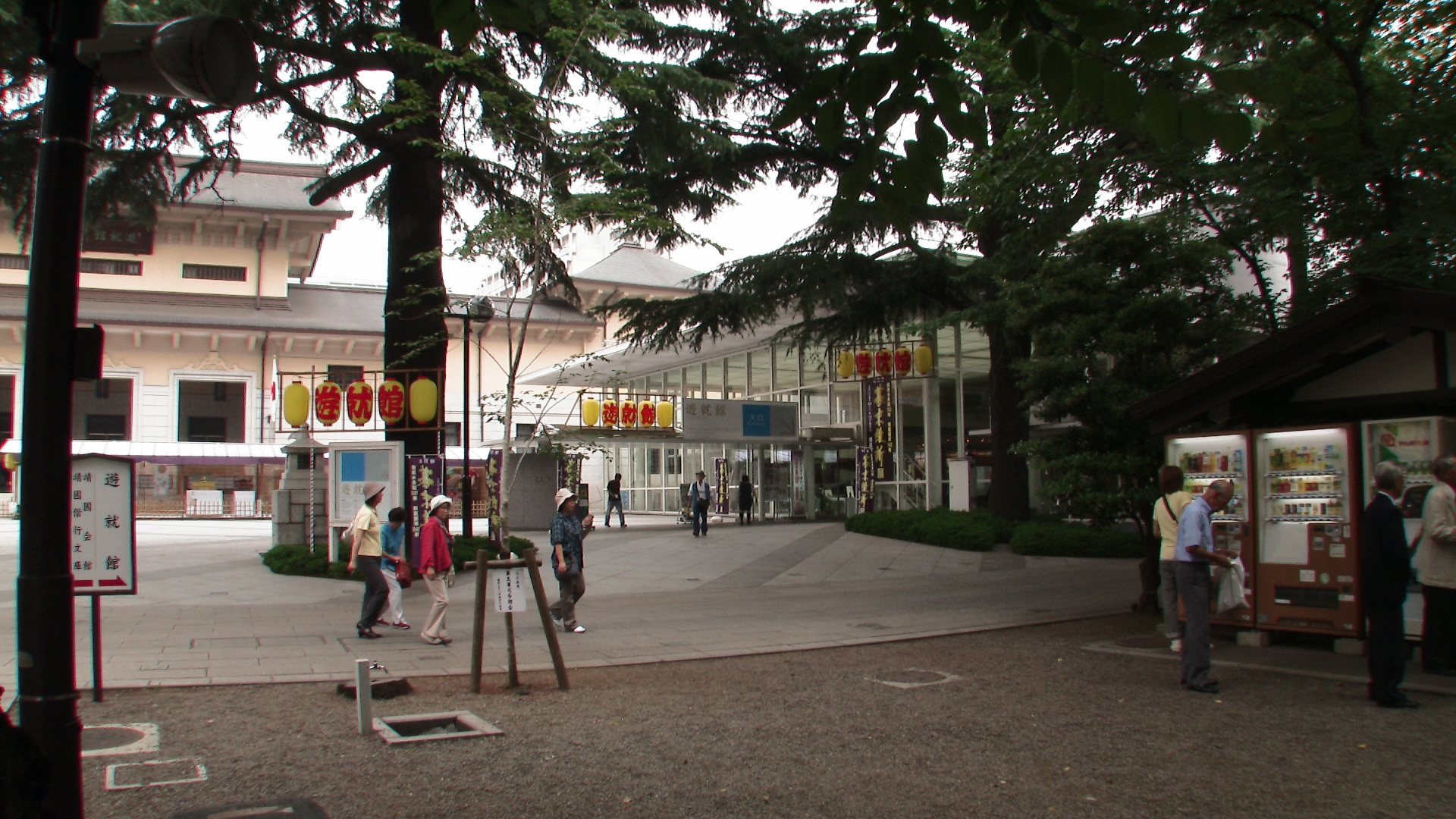
The entrance to the Yūshūkan

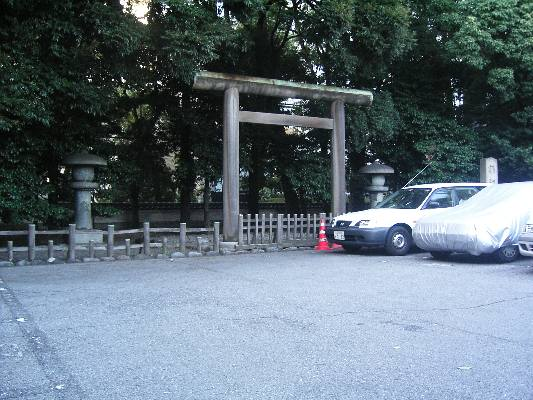
Shōkonsaitei

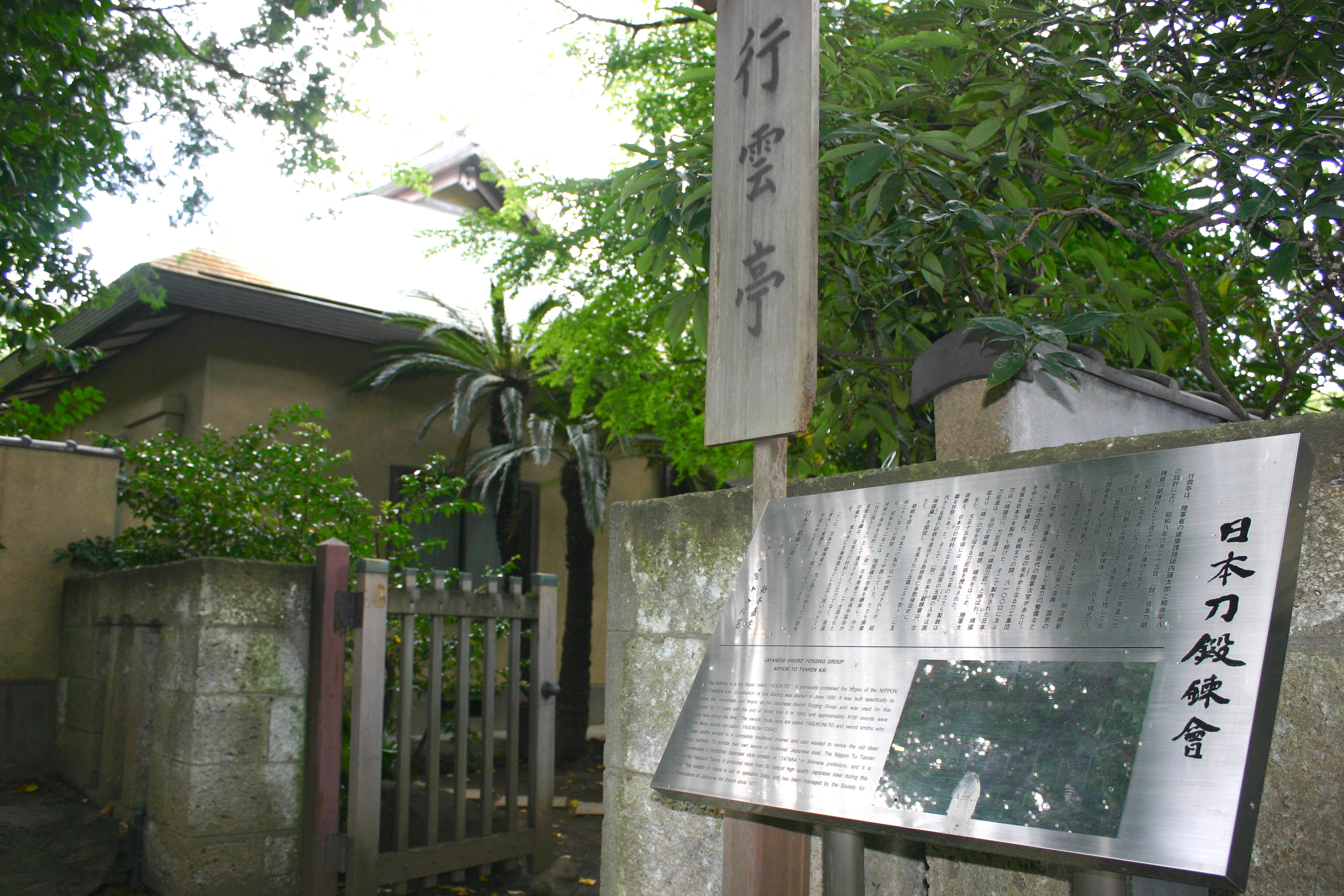
Kōuntei

== Organization ==
The Yasukuni Shrine is an individual religious corporation and does not belong to the Association of Shinto Shrines. The chief priest (宮司, gūji) controls the overall system, and the assistant chief priest (権宮司, gongūji) assists him.

The Yasukuni Shrine has departments listed below:

- Saimu-bu (祭務部)
  - Sōgi-ka (祭儀課)
  - Chōsa-ka (調査課)
- Sōmu-bu (総務部)
  - Sōmu-ka (総務課)
  - Jinji-ka (人事課)
  - Kanri-ka (管理課)
  - Kōhō-ka (広報課)
- Sentoku-bu (宣徳部)
  - Sūkeihōsan-ka (崇敬奉賛課)
  - Sentoku-ka (宣徳課)
- Keiri-bu (経理部)
  - Keiri-ka (経理課)
  - Jigyō-ka (事業課)
- Yūshūkan-bu (遊就館部)
  - Shiryō-ka (史料課)
  - Tenji-ka (展示課)
  - Bunko-shitu (文庫室)
- Shamu jisshūsei (社務実習生)

=== Lists of priests ===
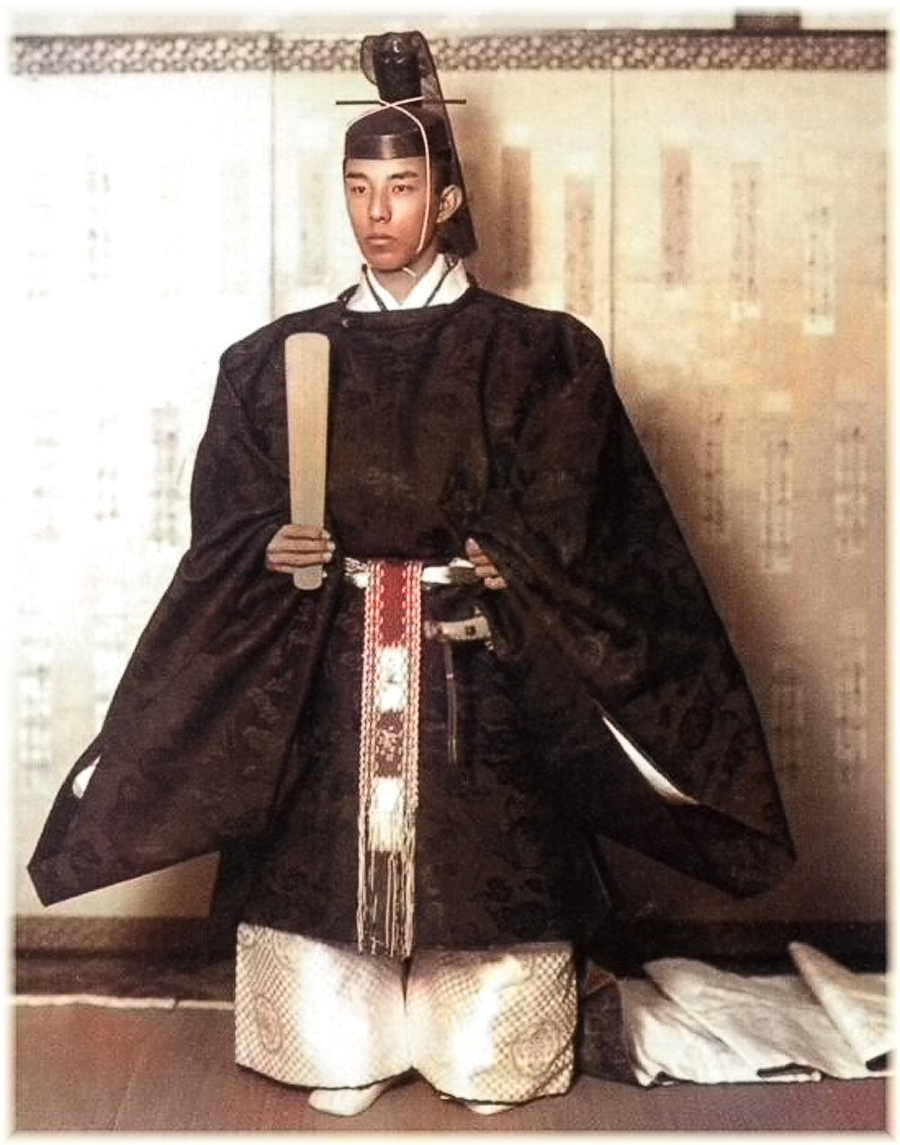
The fifth and longest-serving chief priest, Fujimaro Tsukuba (t. 1946–1978)

List of chief priests of the Yasukuni Shrine
No.	Chief priest	Term of office			Ref
No.	Chief priest	Start	End	Duration	Ref
1	Kiyoshi Aoyama 青山 清	16 July 1879	6 February 1891	11 years, 206 days (Note: Died in office)	
2	Mizuho Kamo 賀茂 水穂	17 February 1891	28 April 1909	18 years, 71 days	
3	Momoki Kamo 賀茂 百樹	29 March 1909	21 April 1938	29 years, 24 days	
4	Takao Suzuki 鈴木 孝雄	21 April 1938	17 January 1946	7 years, 272 days	
5	Fujimaro Tsukuba 筑波 藤麿	25 January 1946	20 March 1978	32 years, 55 days	
6	Nagayoshi Matsudaira 松平 永芳	1 July 1978	31 March 1992	13 years, 275 days	
7	Toshiyasu Ono 大野 俊康	1 April 1992	20 May 1997	5 years, 50 days	
8	Tadashi Yuzawa 湯澤 貞	21 May 1997	10 September 2004	7 years, 113 days	
9	Toshiaki Nanbu 南部 利昭	11 September 2004	7 January 2007	2 years, 119 days	
10	Takaharu Kyōgoku 京極 高晴	15 June 2009	18 January 2013	3 years, 218 days	
11	Yasuhisa Tokugawa (Note: A great-grandson of Yoshinobu Tokugawa, the last Tokugawa shogun) 徳川 康久	19 January 2013	28 February 2018	5 years, 41 days	
12	Kunio Kohori 小堀 邦夫	1 March 2018	31 October 2018	245 days	
13	Tatebumi Yamaguchi 山口 建史	1 November 2018	31 March 2024	5 years, 152 days	
14	Umio Otsuka 大塚 海夫	1 April 2024	Incumbent	2 years, 225 days	

List of associate chief priests of the Yasukuni Shrine
Associate chief priest	Term of office		
Associate chief priest	Start	End	Duration
Shosaku Takahara 高原 正作	16 April 1938	3 October 1945	7 years, 171 days
Tokitsune Yokoi 横井 時常	16 November 1945	30 June 1948	2 years, 228 days
Shuutaro Takeuchi 竹内 秀太郎; Interim	26 April 1948		1 day
Yoshihachi Ikeda 池田 良八	31 August 1948	9 February 1979	30 years, 163 days
Katsushige Fujita 藤田 勝重	9 February 1979	16 July 1982	3 years, 158 days
Tadamasa Suzuki 鈴木 忠正	16 July 1981	1 November 1984	3 years, 119 days
Jushin Kannotou 神野藤 重申	1 November 1984	17 November 1989	5 years, 17 days
Terumichi Kiyama 木山 照道	1 August 1985	5 November 1990	5 years, 97 days
Tadashi Yuzawa 湯澤 貞	1 November 1990	20 May 1997	6 years, 201 days
Katsuo Mitsui 三井 勝生	21 May 1997	8 September 2009	12 years, 111 days
Tadamasa Hanada 花田 忠正	19 January 2000	31 October 2003	3 years, 286 days
Tatebumi Yamaguchi 山口 建史	1 June 2004	30 June 2015	11 years, 30 days
Koji Ogata 小方 孝次	1 November 2009	23 June 2017	7 years, 235 days
Akio Saka 坂 明夫	21 September 2015	30 January 2020	4 years, 132 days
Nobumasa Murata 村田 信昌	1 November 2017	Incumbent	9 years, 11 days

== Cultural references ==
=== Bank notes ===
- 1942–1948: Empire of Japan 50 sen banknote
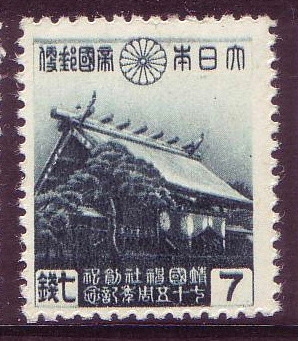
Japanese 7 sen stamp depicting Yasukuni Shrine's honden

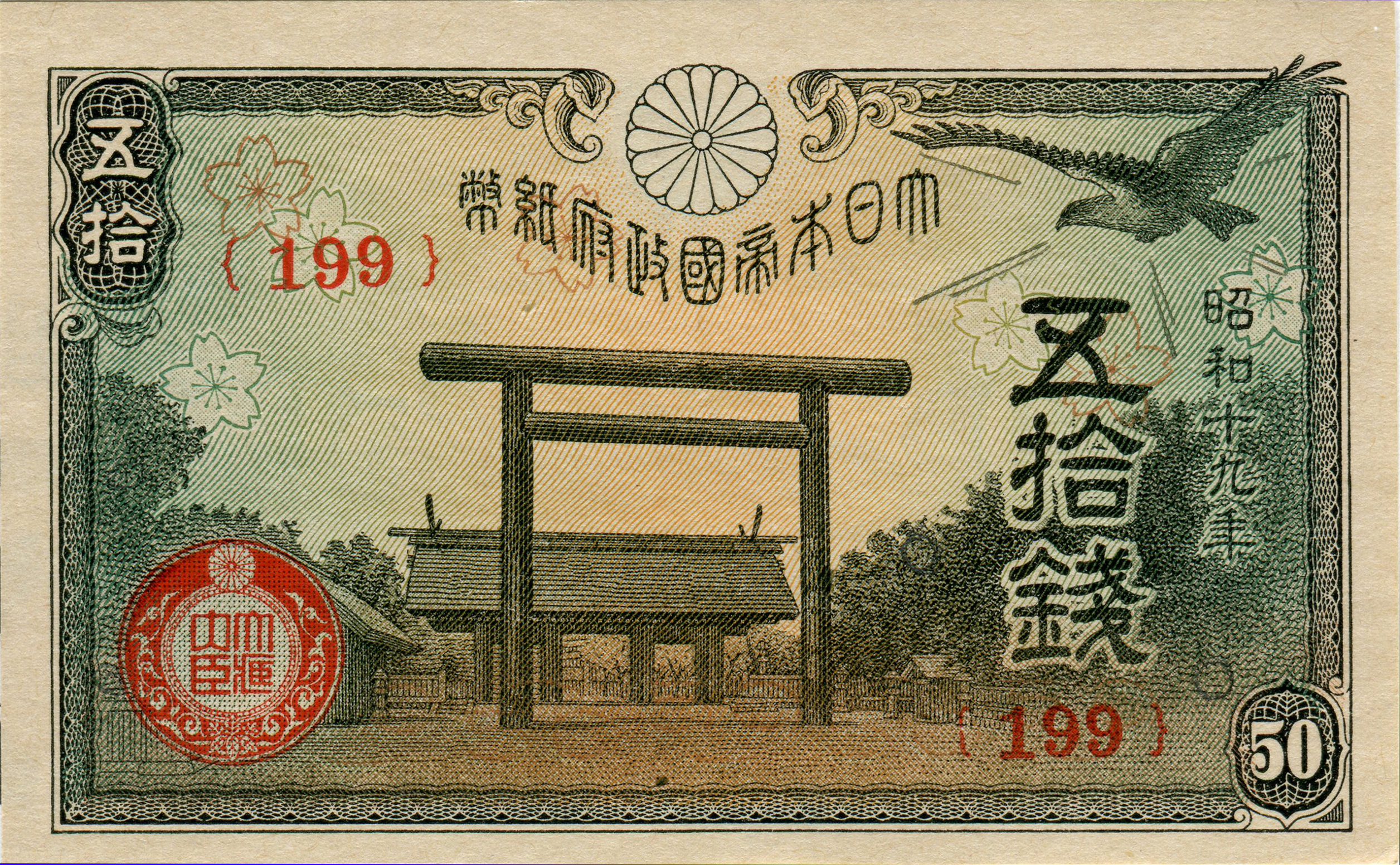
Empire of Japan 50 sen banknote with Yasukuni Shrine

=== Postage stamps ===
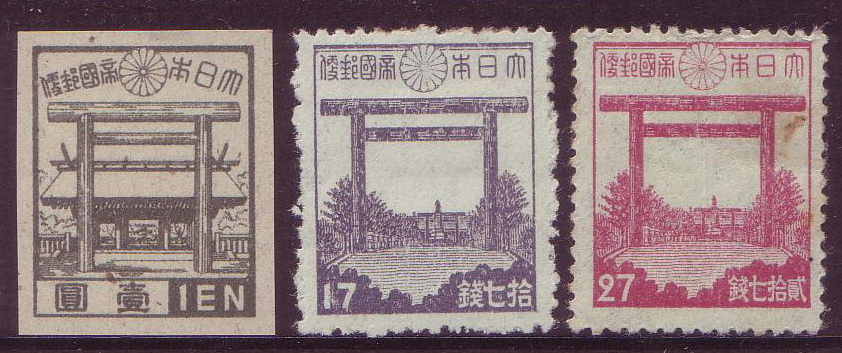
Japanese 17 sen (1943), 27 sen (1945) and 1 yen (1946) stamps which depict the Yasukuni Shrine's Torii and honden

- Japanese 17 sen stamp (1943)
- Japanese 27 sen stamp (1945)
- Japanese 1 yen stamp (1946)

=== Scenic postmarks ===
- Kudan Post Office (九段郵便局)
- Kōjimachi Post Office (麹町郵便局)

=== Popular music ===
- Kudan no haha (九段の母; Mother at Kudan) (Singers: Masaru Shio, Yuriko Futaba etc.)
- Tokyō dayo Okkasan (東京だョおっ母さん; We're in Tokyo, Ma) (Singer: Chiyoko Shimakura)

=== Plays ===
- Dōki no sakura (同期の桜) (My Classmates the Cherry Blossoms )

=== Books ===
- 1881: Buko Nenpyo zokuhen (武江年表続編) (The chronology of Bukō (Edo, Musashi Province), 2nd volume) (Author:Gesshin Saitō (Yukinari Saitō) (斎藤月岑 (斎藤幸成)))
- 1863–1872: Hirosawa Saneomi Nikki (廣澤真臣日記) (The diary of Masaomi Hirosawa) (Author: Masaomi Hirosawa (広沢真臣))
- 1868–1877: Kido Takayoshi Nikki (木戸孝允日記) (The diary of Kido Takayoshi) (Author: Kido Takayoshi)
- 1905: Yasukuni Jinjashi (靖国神社誌) (History of Yasukuni Shrine) (Author: Iwao Yamauchi (山内岩雄))
- 1905–1907: Wagahai wa Neko de Aru (吾輩は猫である) (I Am a Cat) (Author: Natsume Sōseki)
- 1911: Yasukuni Jinjashi (靖国神社誌) (History of Yasukuni Shrine) (Authors: Terauchi Masatake, 斎藤実賀, Momoki Kamo (加茂百樹))
- 1917: Tokyo no sanjunen (東京の三十年) (My thirty years in Tokyo) (Author:Katai Tayama)

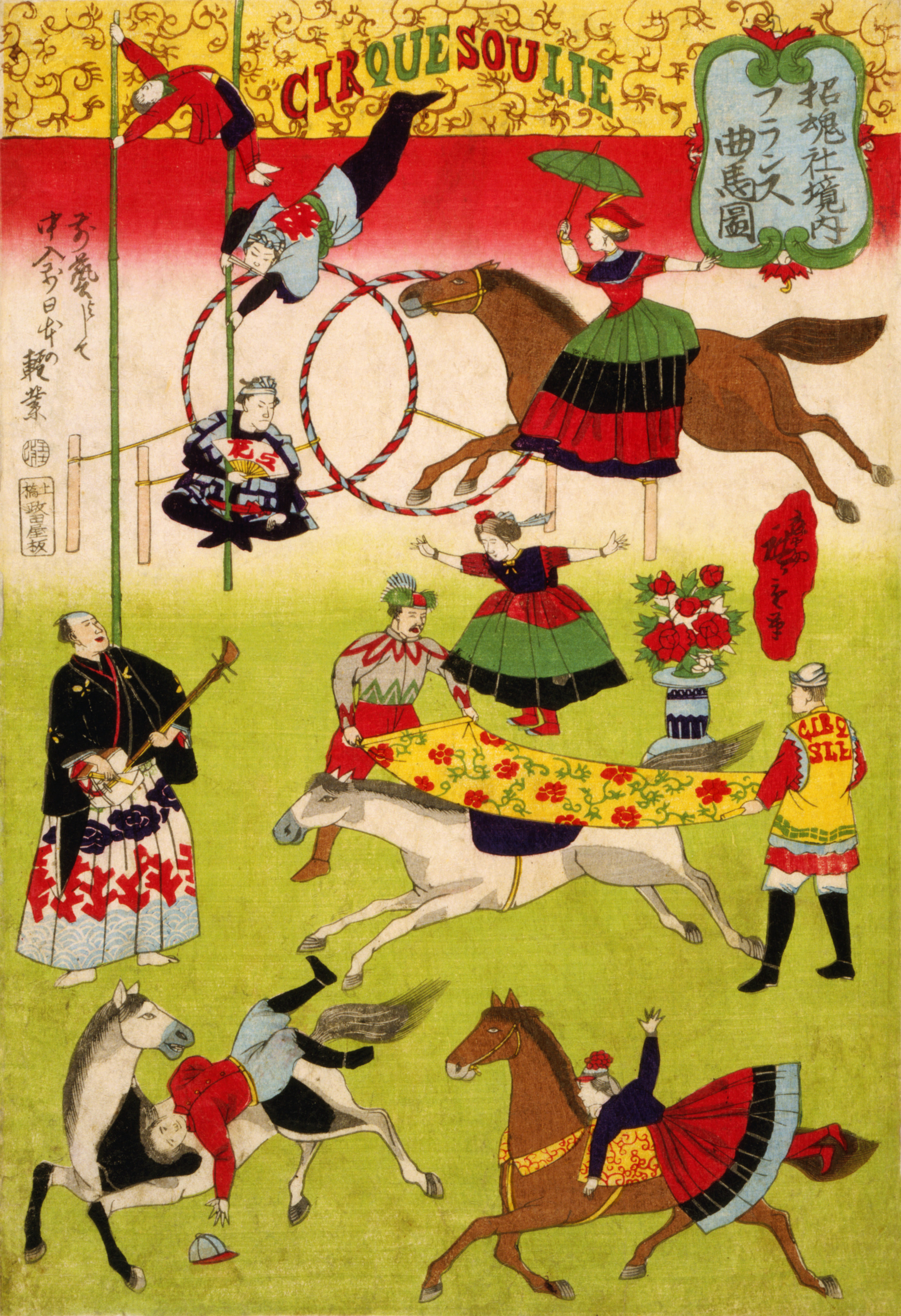
French circus on the grounds of Shokonsha shrine, 1871

=== Posters ===
- 1871: Shōkonsha keidai Furansu ōkyokuba no zu (招魂社境内 フランス大曲馬図) (Big French circus on the grounds of Shokonsha (Yasukuni) shrine)

=== Swords ===
In 1933, Minister of War Sadao Araki founded the Nihon-tō Tanrenkai (日本刀鍛錬会; Japanese Sword Forging Association) in the grounds of the shrine to preserve old forging methods and promote Japan's samurai traditions, as well as to meet the huge demand for guntō (military swords) for officers. About 8,100 "Yasukuni swords" were manufactured in the grounds of the Yasukuni Shrine between 1933 and 1945.

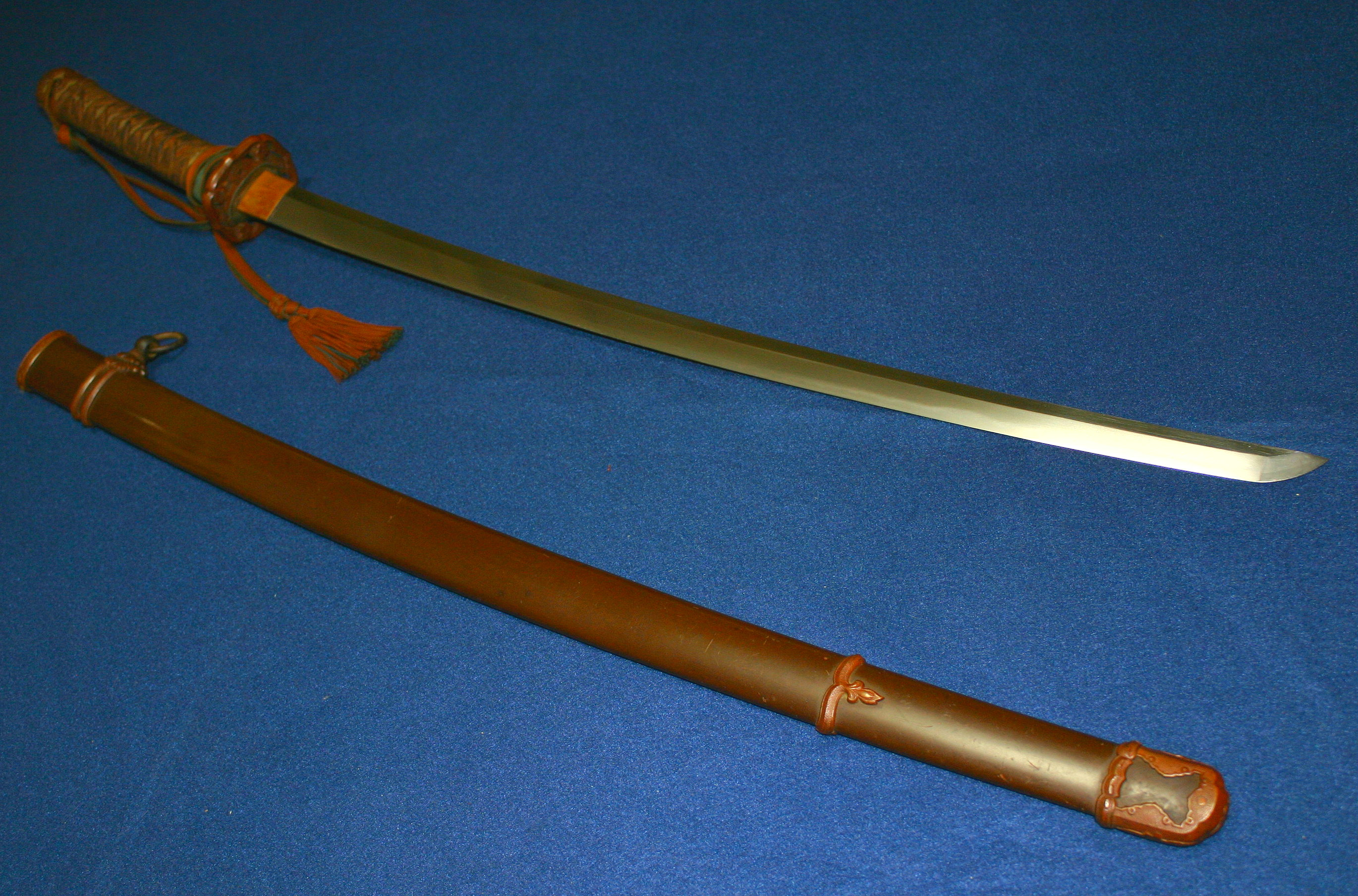
Yasukuni (Kudan) sword (inscription: Yasuhiro)

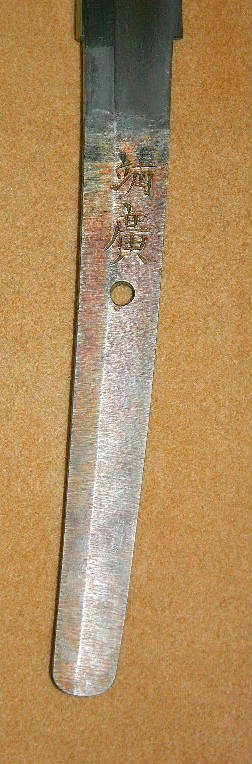
The center of Yasukuni (Kudan) sword (inscription: Yasuhiro)

== Controversies ==
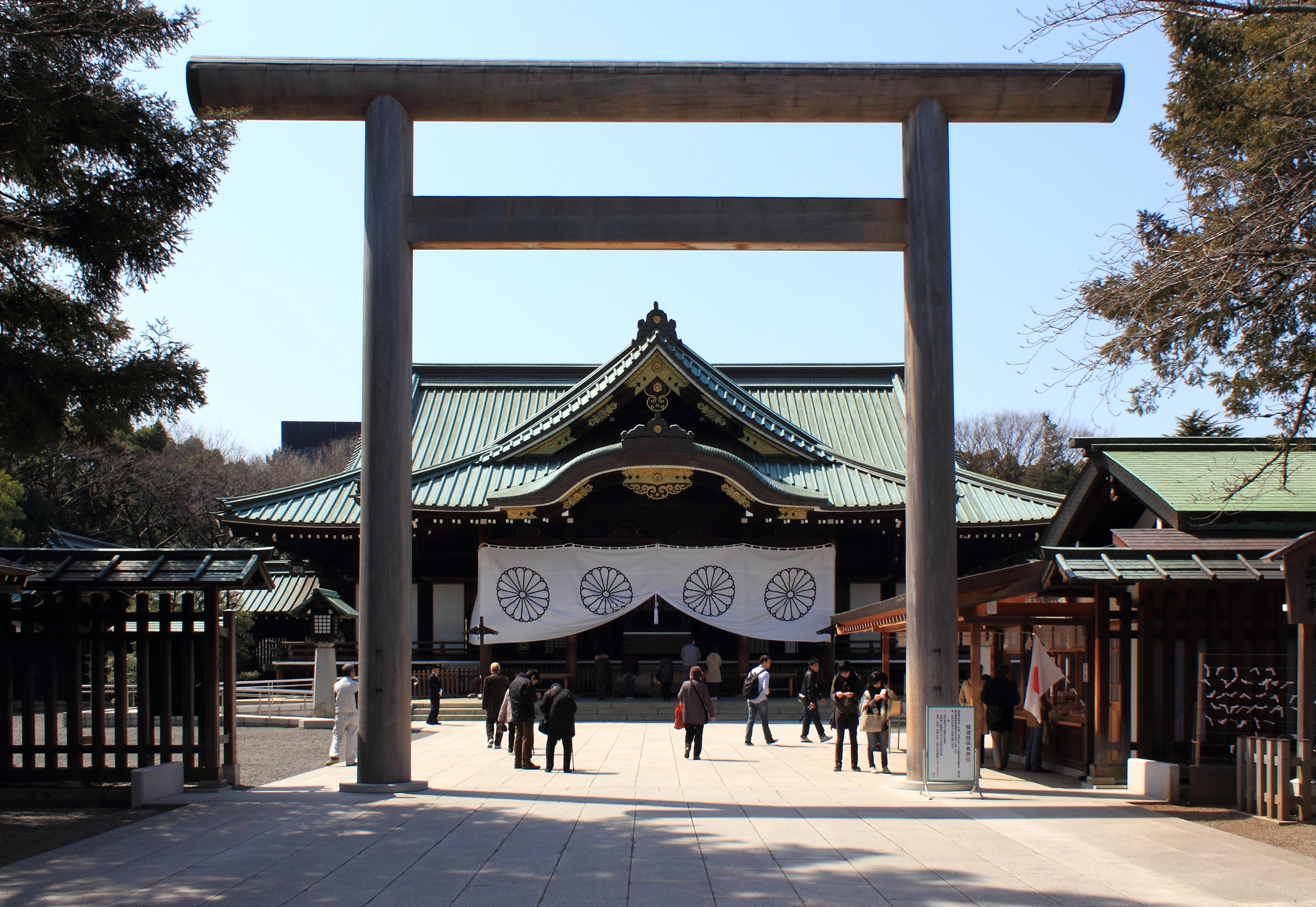
Yasukuni Shrine; March 2012

There are a number of war controversies relating to Yasukuni Shrine and its war museum Yūshūkan in Tokyo, Japan. The shrine is based on State Shinto, as opposed to traditional Japanese Shinto, and has a close history with statism in Shōwa Japan. Most of the dead served the emperors of Japan during wars from 1867 to 1951, but they also include civilians in service and government officials. It is the belief of Shinto that Yasukuni enshrines the actual souls of the dead, known as kami in Japanese. The kami are honored through liturgical texts and ritual incantations known as Norito.

Of the 2,466,532 men named in the shrine's Book of Souls, 1,066 are war criminals convicted by the International Military Tribunal for the Far East, following World War II. Eleven of those war criminals were convicted of Class A war crimes; one was charged with Class A but found guilty of lesser Class B war crimes; two other men were charged with Class A crimes but died before their trials could be completed. This decision to honor individuals who were found responsible for serious breaches of international humanitarian law caused China, Russia, South Korea, and North Korea to call Yasukuni Shrine an exemplar of the nationalist, revisionist, and unapologetic approach Japan has taken towards its conduct during World War II. This has made visits to the shrine by Japanese prime ministers, cabinet members, or parliamentarians extremely controversial. Then-prime minister Junichiro Koizumi made annual personal non-governmental visits from 2001 to 2006. Since 1985, China, North Korea, and South Korea have protested such visits.

The decision on who is enshrined at Yasukuni remains a religious matter. While the practice started when State Shinto was controlled and managed by the civilian and then military governments of Imperial Japan, post-war governments established a strict legal separation that they have maintained ever since. The Yasukuni priesthood have complete religious autonomy over deciding whom they bestow enshrinement, which is thought permanent and irreversible by the shrine's current Kannushi.

== See also ==
- List of Shinto shrines
- Tawau Japanese War Memorial
