= Controversies surrounding Yasukuni Shrine =

Controversies of a Shinto shrine in Japan

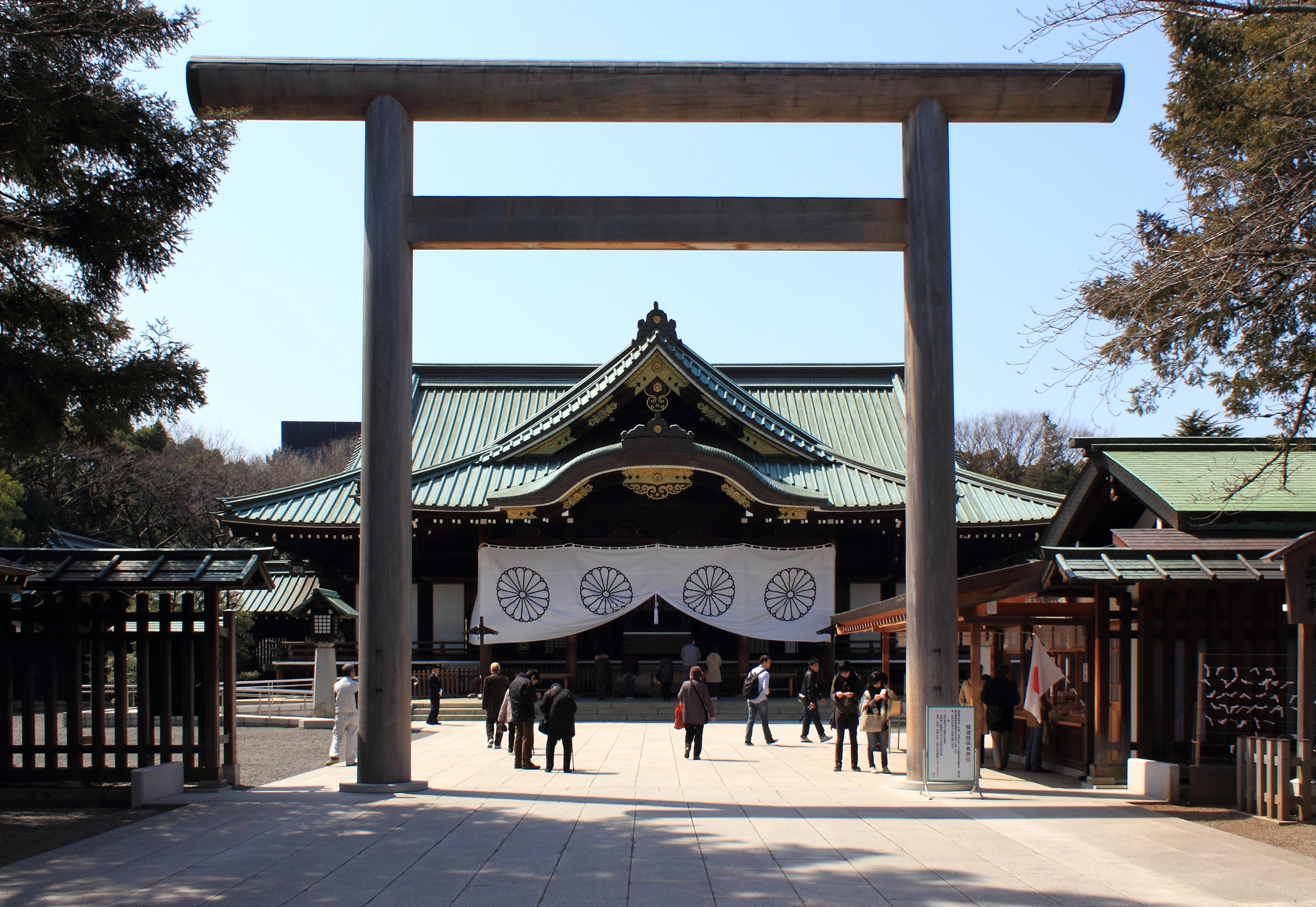
Yasukuni Shrine; March 2012

There are a number of war controversies relating to Yasukuni Shrine and its war museum Yūshūkan in Tokyo, Japan. The shrine is based on State Shinto, as opposed to traditional Japanese Shinto, and has a close history with statism in Shōwa Japan. Most of the dead served the emperors of Japan during wars from 1867 to 1951, but they also include civilians in service and government officials. It is the belief of Shinto that Yasukuni enshrines the actual souls of the dead, known as kami in Japanese. The kami are honored through liturgical texts and ritual incantations known as Norito.

Of the 2,466,532 men named in the shrine's Book of Souls, 1,066 are war criminals convicted by the International Military Tribunal for the Far East, following World War II. Eleven of those war criminals were convicted of Class A war crimes; one was charged with Class A but found guilty of lesser Class B war crimes; two other men were charged with Class A crimes but died before their trials could be completed. This decision to honor individuals who were found responsible for serious breaches of international humanitarian law caused China, Russia, South Korea, and North Korea to call Yasukuni Shrine an exemplar of the nationalist, revisionist, and unapologetic approach Japan has taken towards its conduct during World War II. This has made visits to the shrine by Japanese prime ministers, cabinet members, or parliamentarians extremely controversial. Then-prime minister Junichiro Koizumi made annual personal non-governmental visits from 2001 to 2006. Since 1985, China, North Korea, and South Korea have protested such visits.

The decision on who is enshrined at Yasukuni remains a religious matter. While the practice started when State Shinto was controlled and managed by the civilian and then military governments of Imperial Japan, post-war governments established a strict legal separation that they have maintained ever since. The Yasukuni priesthood have complete religious autonomy over deciding whom they bestow enshrinement, which is thought permanent and irreversible by the shrine's current Kannushi.

== War criminals ==
The shrine enshrines and, according to Shinto beliefs, provides a permanent residence for the spirits of those who have fought on behalf of the emperor, regardless of whether they died in combat. 1,066 of the enshrined kami were Japanese citizens convicted of some level of war crime after World War II and a further two were charged with war crimes but died before their trials were completed. Enshrinement typically carries absolution of earthly deeds. One of the criteria for enshrinement at Yasukuni is that a person be listed as having died of any cause while on duty in the war dead registry of the Japanese government. According to documents released on March 28, 2007, by the National Diet Library of Japan, Health and Welfare Ministry officials and Yasukuni representatives agreed during a meeting, on January 31, 1969, that Class-A war criminals judged at the Tokyo Trial were "able to be honored" as decided by the Shrine Priests and decided not to make this decision public.

On October 17, 1978, fourteen men who had been charged with Class A war crimes—eleven were convicted as Class A war criminals, one was convicted of Class B, two died before completing trial—were enshrined as "Martyrs of Shōwa" (昭和殉難者, Shōwa junnansha) because they were on the war dead registry:

- Death by hanging:
  Hideki Tōjō, Seishirō Itagaki, Heitarō Kimura, Kenji Doihara, Akira Mutō, Kōki Hirota
  Iwane Matsui (sentenced for only Class B offenses)
- Lifetime imprisonment:
  Yoshijirō Umezu, Kuniaki Koiso, Kiichirō Hiranuma, Toshio Shiratori
- 20-year imprisonment:
  Shigenori Tōgō
- Died before a judicial decision was reached (owing to illness or disease):
  Osami Nagano, Yosuke Matsuoka

All imprisoned war criminals either had their sentences commuted or were released by 1958. The enshrinement was revealed to the media on April 19, 1979, and a still-ongoing controversy started in 1985.

== Yūshūkan War Museum ==
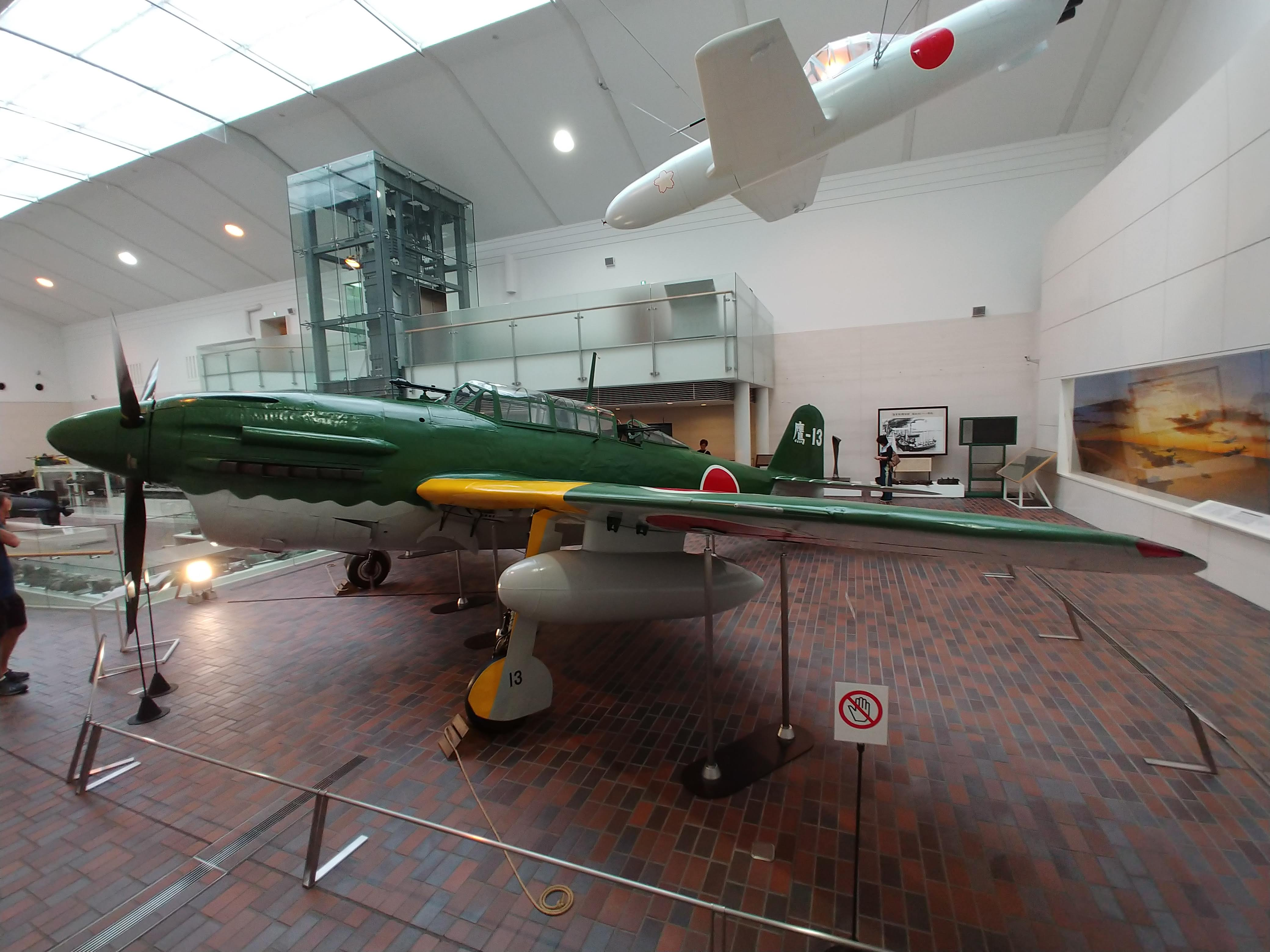
Yokosuka D4Y1 at the Yūshūkan War Museum

Yasukuni Shrine operates a war museum of the history of Japan (the Yūshūkan), which some observers have criticized as presenting a revisionist interpretation. A documentary-style propaganda video shown to museum visitors portrays Japan's conquest of East Asia during the pre-World War II period as an effort to save the region from the imperial advances of colonial Western powers. The museum has no mention of any of the atrocities committed by the Imperial Japanese Army, including the Nanjing massacre.

== Izokukai ==
The political overtones of Yasukuni Shrine are attributed to 4 factors. One is the ideology of State Shinto, which regarded any wars waged in the name of the emperor as just and anyone who died fighting for the emperor as an eirei (英霊; hero spirit). A second is that Japanese Class-A war criminals are honored at the Shrine, and more importantly, that their wartime genocidal, crimes against humanity, etc. criminal actions are absolved of culpability. Another factor is the influence of various support organizations, especially the Japan War-Bereaved Families Association (Izokukai (遺族会)), the largest organization representing the families of war dead from World War II. The most critical issue with many Asian nations that were invaded by Japan is that the Shrine was a meeting place for the Japanese elite to stir-up a frenzy among the Japanese public, before their military went on what was routinely a war of merciless and often genocidal conquest over what they considered inferior peoples.

Yasukuni Shrine considers the Izokukai as its de facto lay organization. The Izokukai was formerly known as the Izoku Kōsei Renmei (遺族厚生連盟; War-Dead-Family Welfare Union), established in 1947. The original purpose of the Izoku Kōsei Renmei was "pursuing the end of warfare, establishing global peace and world prosperity and contributing to the welfare of the humanity." They sought "to provide relief and assistance to the families of those who died in the (Asia Pacific) war." The organization provided assistance to the widows, orphans and aging parents of deceased veterans as well as lobbying the government on behalf of those families' interests. In 1953, the organization became a trust foundation and changed its name to Izokukai. The organization changed its main purpose to pursue "the establishment of a peaceful Japan, the cultivation of character, and the promotion of morality" and to "seek to praise eirei, to promote the welfare of the families of the war dead, and to seek recognition and compensation for civilian auxiliary units." The change, which removed the mention of international pacifism and inserted a reference to eirei, is regarded as giving a nationalist slant to the character of the organization. Chairmen of the organization have usually been members of the governing Liberal Democratic party and the organization is regarded as the informal pipeline between the LDP and the Shrine. In 1962, Okinori Kaya, a militant member of the LDP and a convicted class A war criminal, was appointed chairman.

== Politicians' visits ==
Japanese politicians' visits to worship at Yasukuni Shrine have resulted in controversy. This issue first surfaced when emperor Hirohito refused to visit the shrine from 1978 until his death in 1989. According to a memorandum released in 2006 kept by Imperial Household Agency Grand Steward Tomohiko Tomita, Hirohito stated that the reason he stopped visiting the shrine was because of the decision to enshrine class A war criminals.

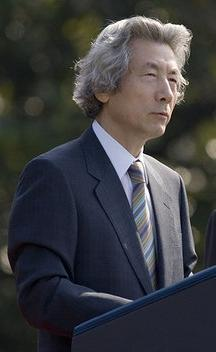
Former Japanese Prime Minister Junichiro Koizumi

Prime Minister Junichiro Koizumi was one of the most outspoken and controversial visitors. On October 17, 2005, Koizumi visited the shrine for the fifth time since taking office. Although he claimed that his visit was a private affair, it came only days before Japanese Foreign Minister Nobutaka Machimura was scheduled to visit Chinese officials in Beijing to strengthen Sino-Japanese relations. The People's Republic of China responded by canceling the scheduled visit as they consider the shrine a glorification of Japan's past military aggression. Koizumi's annual visits continued to draw criticism from around the world. During the 2005 APEC summit in Busan, South Korea, Chinese Foreign Minister Li Zhaoxing blasted Koizumi's visits, asking, "What would European people think if German leaders were to visit (memorials) related to Hitler and Nazis?" In 2006, Henry Hyde, chairman of the United States House Committee on Foreign Affairs, stated that Koizumi would embarrass the United States Congress and offend American veterans of World War II if he were to give a Congressional speech after making another visit to Yasukuni.

Koizumi's expected successor, Shinzo Abe, visited the shrine in April 2006 before he took office. Although this visit concerned both Chinese and South Korean governments, Abe remained vague as to whether he had visited or would visit the shrine in the future. Subsequent events have led some to suggest that a compromise on the issue was reached with China. Abe publicly supported his predecessor's visits to the shrine, and he made at least one visit to the shrine during his term as prime minister. On June 7, 2007, former President of the Republic of China Lee Teng-hui visited the Shrine to pay tribute to his older brother who died in the Japanese Imperial Navy; he too volunteered as a Japanese Imperial Army officer. Former prime minister Yasuo Fukuda has vowed never to visit the shrine. Fukuda's open political opposition to the shrine has helped improve relations with China, and North and South Korea.

A group of 62 Diet members from the Liberal Democratic Party and the People's New Party, including former Minister of Agriculture Yoshinobu Shimamura and Fukuda's special adviser Eriko Yamatani, visited the shrine on April 22, 2008. On April 23, 2013, a group of 169 Japanese lawmakers visited the shrine.

On August 13, 2021, Defense Minister Nobuo Kishi visited the shrine.

Prime Minister Sanae Takaichi made offerings to the shrine on April 21, 2026, but did not visit Yasukuni.

General opinions in Japan of the politicians' visits have varied significantly, with the percentages of those who approve ranging from as low as 38% in telephone surveys to as high as 71% on the internet. In a 2015 self-administered survey by Genron NPO, 66% of the respondents did not see a problem with the visits while 15.7% opposed them completely. A 2006 public opinion poll taken by Nihon Keizai Shimbun also found that half of the respondents supported Koizumi's visit to the shrine while 37% opposed it.

=== Foreign visitors ===
==== Pre-war ====
- (United States) President Emeritus of Harvard University Charles William Eliot visited on July 10, 1913.
- (United Kingdom) Major General Nathaniel Walter Barnardiston of the British Army visited on December 14, 1914.
- Crown Prince of Romania Carol visited on July 7, 1920.
- (French Third Republic) Marshal of France Joseph Joffre visited on January 22, 1922.
- (United Kingdom) Edward, Prince of Wales visited on April 18, 1922.
- (French Third Republic) Governor-General of French Indochina Martial Merlin visited on May 24, 1924.
- (Kingdom of Italy) Colonel Francesco de Pinedo of the Italian Air Force visited on September 30, 1925.
- (China) General Wu Guangxin visited on October 16, 1925.
- Crown Prince of Sweden Gustaf Adolf visited on September 12, 1926.
- (Kingdom of Italy) Italian Navy Captain Luigi Miraglia visited on November 25, 1927.
- (Kingdom of Italy) Ambassador of Italy to Japan Pompeo Aloisi visited on July 26, 1928.
- (United Kingdom) Prince Henry, Duke of Gloucester visited on May 5, 1929.
- (French Third Republic) French Navy Counter-Admiral Georges Mouget visited in October 25, 1929.
- (Thailand) Prince Alongkot visited on November 26, 1929.
- Crown Prince Frederik of Denmark visited on March 18, 1930.
- (Thailand) King of Siam Rama VII visited on April 8, 1931.
- (French Third Republic) French Navy Vice-Admiral Octave Benjamin Herr visited in June 17, 1931.
- (Weimar Republic) Reichsmarine Captain Robert Witthoeft visited on July 9, 1931.
- (United States) Charles Lindbergh visited on August 27, 1931.
- (United Kingdom) Lord Victor Bulwer-Lytton visited on March 2, 1932.
- (Canada) Canadian Minister to Japan Herbert Meredith Marler visited on July 6, 1932.
- (French Third Republic) French Navy Vice-Admiral Charles Berthelot visited in September 5, 1932.
- (Peru) Lieutenant Colonel of the Peruvian Army Felipe de la Barra visited in October 21, 1932.
- (Kingdom of Italy) Italian Navy Captain Guido Bacci di Capaci visited on October 27, 1932.
- (United Kingdom) George Bernard Shaw visited on March 8, 1933.
- (French Third Republic) French Navy Captain André Marquis visited in April 4, 1933.
- United States Navy Admiral Montgomery M. Taylor visited in June 3, 1933.
- Prince of Sweden Carl visited on June 22, 1933.
- (Nazi Germany) Ambassador of Germany to Japan Herbert von Dirksen visited on January 11, 1934.
- (Belgium) Belgian Special Envoy William A. M. A. Thys visited on June 1, 1934.
- United States Navy Admiral Frank B. Upham visited in May 4, 1935.
- (French Third Republic) French Navy Vice-Admiral Jean-Pierre Esteva visited in October 21, 1935.
- United States Navy Admiral Orin G. Murfin visited in May 26, 1936.
- (United Kingdom) Major General Francis S. Piggott of the British Army visited on June 26, 1936.
- (Nazi Germany) Kriegsmarine Captain Walter Lohmann visited on January 19, 1937.
- (United States) Cardinal Dennis Joseph Dougherty visited on February 18, 1937.
- (French Third Republic) French Navy Vice-Admiral Jules Le Bigot visited in July 3, 1937.
- (Kingdom of Italy) Italian Special Envoy Marquis Giacomo Paulucci di Calboli visited on March 20, 1938.
- (Nazi Germany) Director of the Hitler Youth mission to Japan Reinhold Schulze visited on August 17, 1938.
- Former Prime Minister of Peru José de la Riva-Agüero y Osma visited in November 30, 1938.
- (Argentina) Argentine Special Envoy Federico Quintana visited on February 18, 1940.
- (Kingdom of Italy) Ambassador of Italy to Japan Giacinto Auriti visited on March 18, 1940.
- (Mexico) Mexican Special Envoy Ernesto Hidalgo visited on April 13, 1940.
- (Francoist Spain) Spanish Special Envoy Alberto Castro Girona visited on June 7, 1940.
- (Thailand) Thai Special Envoy Wan Waithayakon visited on April 28, 1941.
- (Nazi Germany) Ambassador of Germany to Japan Eugen Ott visited on October 20, 1941.

==== Post-war, prior to enshrinement of Class A war criminals ====
- (Taiwan) President of the Republic of China Legislative Yuan Chang Tao-fan visited on April 19, 1956.
- (Myanmar) Agga Maha Pandita Sayadaw U Thittila visited on May 17, 1956.
- (Australia) Lieutenant General of the Australian Army Rudolph Bierwirth visited on May 31, 1956.
- (Taiwan) Chairman of the APACL Ku Cheng-kang visited on April 3, 1957.
- (Turkey) Turkish Minister of National Defense Ethem Menderes visited on April 5, 1959.
- (Myanmar) Former Prime Minister of Burma U Nu visited on March 23, 1960.
- President of Argentina Arturo Frondizi visited on December 15, 1961.
- (Dominion of Ceylon) Vice President of the WVF Rex De Costa visited on October 14, 1962.
- (France) French Navy Captain Pierre Clotteau visited in February 11, 1963.
- King of Thailand Rama IX visited on June 4, 1963.
- (France) Director of the French military aid mission to Laos General Robert Lancrenon visited in April 20, 1964.
- (Myanmar) Burmese Minister of Labor Than Sein visited on September 20, 1964.
- (Italy) Italian Minister of Defence Giulio Andreotti visited on October 7, 1964.
- Commander-in-Chief of the Pakistan Army Muhammad Musa visited on October 17, 1964.
- Ambassador of West Germany to Japan Herbert Dittmann visited on March 26, 1965.
- Ambassador of Argentina to Japan Guillermo Caño visited on July 10, 1965.
- Ambassador South Vietnam to Japan Nguyen Duy Quang visited on September 28, 1965.
- (Netherlands) President of the WVF Bib van Lanschot visited on October 10, 1965.
- Second Lady of the United States Muriel Humphrey visited on December 29, 1965.
- (France) French Navy Captain Christian Claverie visited in January 31, 1966.
- Ambassador of Peru to Japan José Carlos Ferreyros Balta visited on February 17, 1966.
- Ambassador of Chile to Japan Augusto Marambio Cabrera visited on May 30, 1966.
- (South Vietnam) South Vietnamese Minister of Economy Nguyen Duy Xuan visited on April 3, 1967.
- Ambassador of Brazil to Japan Alvaro Teixeira Soares visited on June 25, 1968.
- (West Germany) Inspector General of the Bundeswehr Ulrich de Maizière visited on December 2, 1968.
- (Switzerland) Executive Director of the ICRC Roger Gallopin visited on March 20, 1969.
- United States Navy Rear Admiral Daniel Smith visited on April 9, 1969.
- United States Under Secretary of the Navy John Warner visited on August 24, 1969.
- (West Germany) Chief of Staff of the Luftwaffe Johannes Steinhoff visited on January 12, 1970.
- (Argentina) Argentine Navy Captain Emilio Eduardo Massera visited on July 2, 1970.
- (West Germany) Inspector of the West German Navy Gert Jeschonnek visited on July 6, 1971.
- (Spain) Spanish Navy Frigate-Captain Ricardo Vallespín Raurell visited on March 21, 1972.
- Ambassador of Chile to Japan Oscar Pinochet de la Barra visited on April 1, 1972.
- (West Germany) Inspector of the West German Army Ernst Ferber visited on January 28, 1973.
- (South Vietnam) Former Emperor of Vietnam Bảo Đại visited on February 14, 1973.
- King of Tonga Taufa'ahau Tupou IV visited in November 17, 1973.
- (France) French Navy Captain Christian Brac de la Perrière visited in February 19, 1974.
- (Myanmar) Burmese Deputy Minister of Agriculture Bo Lay visited on November 8, 1975.
- (France) French Navy Captain Stéphane Beaussant visited in March 7, 1977.
- (Thailand) Deputy Supreme Commander of the Thai Armed Forces Kriangsak Chamanan visited on September 4, 1977.
- (West Germany) West German Navy Frigate-Captain Gerhard Krancke visited on April 17, 1978.

==== After enshrinement of Class A war criminals ====
- (Tibet) The 14th Dalai Lama visited on November 1, 1980.
- (Indonesia) Indonesian Minister of Religious Affairs Alamsyah Ratu Perwiranegara visited on June 22, 1981.
- Ambassador of Egypt to Japan Mohamed Samy Sabet visited on June 10, 1985.
- Prime Minister of Lithuania Adolfas Šleževičius visited on September 21, 1993.
- (India) Prashanto Pal, the son of Justice Radhabinod Pal visited on April 26, 1995.
- United States Marine Corps Lieutenant General Wallace Gregson (the 3rd Marine Division's commanding general) visited on April 26, 2001.
- Former Minister of Finance of Indonesia Rizal Ramli visited in 2002.
- Former President of Peru Alberto Fujimori visited on April 10, 2002.
- Prime Minister of the Solomon Islands Allan Kemakeza visited on July 10, 2005.
- (Taiwan) Former President of the Republic of China Lee Teng-hui visited on October 27, 2007. His elder brother is among the 27,863 Taiwanese honored there.
- (France) French National Front leader Jean-Marie Le Pen visited on August 14, 2010.
- (Hungary) Members of Jobbik Magyarországért Mozgalom and Magyar Gárda also visited on August 14, 2010.
- (East Turkestan) World Uyghur Congress president Rebiya Kadeer visited on May 14, 2012.
- Ambassador of Ukraine to Japan Sergiy Korsunsky visited on September 3, 2024.

== Domestic impact ==
The controversial nature of the shrine has figured largely in both domestic Japanese politics and relations with other Asian countries. The controversy has been reignited nearly every year since 1975, when prime minister Takeo Miki visited the shrine as a private individual on August 15, the day that Japan commemorates the end of World War II. The next year, his successor Fukuda Takeo visited as a private individual yet signed the visitors' book as prime minister. Several other Japanese prime ministers have visited the shrine since 1979: Masayoshi Ohira in 1979; Zenko Suzuki in 1980, 1981 and 1982; Yasuhiro Nakasone in 1983 and 1985 (on the latter occasion, he offered flowers which had been paid for with government money); Kiichi Miyazawa in 1992, which visit was kept secret until 1996 (he had paid a visit in 1980 before becoming Prime Minister); Ryutaro Hashimoto in 1996; and Junichiro Koizumi, who visited six times (2001, 2002, 2003, 2004, 2005, and 2006). Visits by Japanese prime ministers to the shrine have resulted in official condemnation by neighboring countries since 1985, as they see it as an attempt to legitimize Japan's past militarism.

Visits to the shrine are also controversial in the domestic debate over the proper role of religion in Japanese government. Some Liberal Democratic Party (LDP) politicians insist that visits are protected by the constitutional right to freedom of religion and that it is appropriate for legislators to pay their respects to those fallen in war. However, proposals for the construction of a secular memorial, so that those wishing to honor Japan's military dead do not have to visit Yasukuni, have thus far failed, ostensibly for technical details rather than the rejection of a secular memorial. The Japanese government conducts yearly memorial services to commemorate the War in Budokan ("Martial Arts Hall", a secular building) which is near Yasukuni shrine, so that the attendees can later visit Yasukuni Shrine privately if they so wish.

On March 29, 2007, a book of documents was released by Japan's National Diet Library, called "A New Compilation of Materials on the Yasukuni Shrine Problems", including declassified documents from the Occupational Government, the Japanese Health and Welfare Ministry and Yasukuni Shrine. The documents purportedly draw a connection between the Japanese Government and the war criminal enshrinement. According to Prime Minister Shinzo Abe the government had no say in who is enshrined. In addition, Vice Minister of Health, Labor, and Welfare Tsuji Tetsuo told reporters that the former ministry was "in charge of keeping the personal records of soldiers and civilian employees of the military, and with presenting records as the need arose." "A New Compilation of Materials on the Yasukuni Shrine Problems" has been entered into the Library of Congress.

=== Domestic political debate ===
One controversy of political visits to the shrine is the constitutionality of visits by the Prime Minister. In the Constitution of Japan, the separation of state and religion is explicit. Because the clause was written for the express purpose of preventing the return of State Shinto, many question the constitutionality of the Prime Minister visiting Yasukuni Shrine. Often the first question Japanese prime ministers are asked by journalists after a visit is, "Are you here as a private person or as Prime Minister?" In addition, whether the Prime Minister has signed the visitors' book indicating the position of signatory as shijin (私人; private person) or shushō (首相; Prime Minister) is diligently reported. All Prime Ministers have so far stated that their visit was private; however, although some leave the signature section blank or sign it as shijin, others sign it as shushō. The issue is somewhat different than that of visits by the German Chancellor to the Holocaust Memorial, which are explicitly made in the context of a state visit. Prime Minister Koizumi gave a somewhat cryptic answer, stating that he visited the shrine as Junichiro Koizumi, the Prime Minister of Japan. Some consider such statement as a move towards making visits somewhat official; others consider that it is pointing out that the whole issue of shijin vs shushō is somewhat meaningless. Some journals and news reports, such as one made by Kyodo News Agency on August 15, 2006, question whether in the case of Koizumi's visits, which are consistently claimed by Koizumi to be private, can be considered individual in nature when they are part of a campaign pledge, which in nature is political. Currently, most of the Japanese public and most jurists have agreed that there have been no constitutional violations yet. In 2014, Shinzo Abe, 15 of the 18 members of his cabinet, and 289 of 480 Diet members were affiliated to the openly revisionist lobby Nippon Kaigi, which advocates the restoration of monarchy and State Shinto, negates Japanese war crimes, and recommends the revision of the Constitution and school textbooks as well as visits by prime ministers to the Shrine. The chief priest of the shrine, Yasuhisa Tokugawa (also the great-grandson of Tokugawa Yoshinobu, the last shōgun), is a member of Nippon Kaigi's representative committee.

The views expressed by Yasukuni Shrine through its museum and website are also controversial. Both sites make it clear that Yasukuni Shrine does not regard the conduct of Japan during World War II as an act of aggression but rather a matter of self-defence and a heroic effort to repel European imperialism. Defenders of (private) visits by the Prime Minister point out that, regardless, there is no other venue to pay respect to the fallen in Japan, so that the Prime Minister as well as the large number of Japanese who visit the shrine have no choice. Moreover, most people (including the Prime Minister) who visit Yasukuni deliberately avoid entering the museum so that the visit remains religious rather than political. A number of proposals have been made to alleviate controversy. One is to somehow "remove" the controversial spirits and place them in a different location so that visits to Yasukuni Shrine would not be as politically charged. This proposal has been strongly pushed by China and Korea. The Japanese government cannot force Yasukuni Shrine to do so (owing to the separation of church and state). Moreover, the shrine is adamant that once a kami has been housed at the shrine, it cannot be separated. The one method which is suggested as theologically valid is to abolish the entire enshrinement, then repeat the entire enshrinement rite of kami since the Boshin War without including the A class war criminals. Some argue that selective abolishment of enshrinement is technically possible, as there are several precedents of selective de-enshrinement in the Tokugawa era. The Shinto processes of bunrei and kanjō exist specifically to remove a kami from its shrine and re-enshrine it elsewhere, but typically leave the kami at the originating shrine intact and unchanged.

Another proposal is to create a separate secular memorial where the prime minister can make official state visits for memorial purposes. On October 28, 2005, the Liberal Democratic Party and the Democratic Party of Japan agreed to set up a cross-party "group for pushing forward the establishment of a national memorial facility" to bring about the foundation of a secular war memorial dedicated only to "ordinary" soldiers. This would replace Yasukuni Shrine as the home of Japan's war dead. The group was set to meet for the first time on November 9, 2005.

Critics point out that groups representing families of the war dead express no interest in a separate secular memorial, preferring Yasukuni Shrine. Furthermore, the Japanese government already conducts yearly secular commemoration services at the Budokan for the families of soldiers killed in World War II. Afterwards, these families usually make private visits to Yasukuni Shrine, which is located within walking distance. Since the proposed memorial site is geographically distant, were the ceremony to be relocated to the proposed memorial site such visits would be made more difficult. A number of families of the names listed at the shrine have indicated that the controversy is disturbing the peaceful rest of their dead family members and that they wish to pay homage to them without controversy and media attention. There is in fact a memorial to the Japanese (unidentified) war dead within walking distance of Yasukuni, called Chidorigafuchi National Cemetery (千鳥ヶ淵戦没者墓苑), which has been suggested could be used as an alternative by Japanese politicians to pay their respects to those who died during the war.

In March 2008, a group of lawmakers from the Liberal Democratic Party, featuring Tomomi Inada, called for boycott of the film Yasukuni, documentary made on Yasukuni by Chinese-born director Ying Li about the links between the shrine and right-wing movements such as the Uyoku dantai. Those lawmakers had asked for a preview on the ground that the movie could be "anti-Japanese". The Directors Guild of Japan expressed apprehension about the possible infringement of freedom of expression and as a result of the politicians' protests, only about 10 theaters would screen the movie, and none in Tokyo.

=== Domestic historical debate ===
Yasukuni Shrine is a privately owned Shinto shrine located in the heart of Tokyo, Japan. The Meiji Emperor built the shrine in 1886 to house the remains and souls of those who died in civil conflicts. The shrine is now the memorial site for over 2.5 million people who have died in conflict, mainly in World War II. The inclusion of 14 convicted Class-A war criminals in the shrine has resulted in controversy, particularly after the visits of Japanese prime ministers. China and at times South Korea have also objected to the shrine, as prior to World War II, Japan controlled the Korean Peninsula and parts of the Manchurian region in China, and committed the massacre of Nanjing.

"Class-A" war criminals are those who are charged with "crimes against peace" while Class-C criminals are charged with crimes against humanity. In some cases, requests by survivors and their families to have their names removed from the Yasukuni have been denied, leading to litigation. Koreans and Taiwanese who were forced to fight in the war are also listed on the Yasukuni as deity of Japan, some of whom survived the war, and Japanese from Okinawa who were forced to self-determine during the Battle of Okinawa are also at issue.

Japanese courts have rejected these lawsuits several times. Numerous requests have been made by groups in other countries to remove the remains of the 14 war criminals or their own family members from the shrine, but as the shrine is owned by a private religious institution rather than the government, and the removal of remains would violate Shinto beliefs, the requests were denied. In January 2025, the Tokyo Supreme Court rejected an appeal to reconsider the Tokyo High Court's ruling denying the removal of the Korean names in 1959 on the basis that the 20 year statute of limitations has been exceeded. In Shinto, a body cannot be removed once it is placed into a shrine to be worshipped as a "kami". This shows that Yasukuni is a different facility from the national cemetery where bereaved families have religious freedom and veto rights.

=== Religious attitudes in Japan ===
Different Japanese religious authorities and groups, within and beyond the Shinto faith, have expressed varying opinions over the decades about Yasukuni's proper place in Japanese society and its adoption of convicted Class A war criminals as heroic spirits. Shinto folk belief holds that fallen soldiers' spirits are embittered and hateful; Shintoists believe their enshrinement at Yasukuni serves to appease them and protect Japan against their vengeance. Until 1955, convicted war criminals were ineligible for enshrinement because the government considered them dishonorably discharged. This policy was changed, creating the legal conditions necessary for war criminals' enshrinement, after lobbying by the political Japan War-Bereaved Families Association, not the Shinto community itself. Uzuhiko Ashizu, called "probably the most influential individual in post-War mainstream Shinto", discouraged their enshrinement unless clear popular consensus favoring it emerged. No such public support existed when they were actually enshrined. Tsukuba Fujimaro, head priest of Yasukuni from 1946 until his sudden death in 1978, firmly opposed their inclusion, believing instead that Yasukuni should promote world peace and commemorate all the war dead, including foreigners and other victims of the Imperial Japanese Army, consecrating Chinreisha for this purpose in 1965. His successor, Matsudaira Nagayoshi, was explicitly motivated to enshrine the Class A war criminals by his revisionist ideology, "insist[ing]" that "Japan cannot restore its spirit without negating the Tokyo Trial, the so-called Class A war criminals must be enshrined."

Although the Association of Shinto Shrines, which represents about 95% of Shinto shrines in Japan, endorsed the war criminals' apotheosis in an official statement in 2005, other Shinto member shrines, priests and parishioners reject the inclusion of Class A war criminals. Hirohito, who as emperor had been the traditional leader of the Shinto faith, disapproved their enshrinement and refused to attend Yasukuni once they were included. His imperial successors, Akihito and the reigning Naruhito, have maintained this embargo out of a shared belief. In 1996, the former enquired before visiting a prefectural shrine to the war dead whether Class A war criminals were worshipped there. The Association's hierarchical structure and conventions about discreet criticism require dissenters within organized Shinto to be discreet, but it "has been unable to garner the support of the vast majority of shrines and priests" for its policy. Since the mid-2010s, opponents to Yasukuni's existing policy have voiced their opinions in public. Miwa Takahiro, priest at Nagoya's Hiyoshi Shrine, publicly denounced "Yasukuni fundamentalism" as "authoritarianism" in interviews and in his shrine's official Web presence. In 2018, Jinja Shinpō, the Association's weekly newspaper, published an editorial indirectly criticizing Yasukuni's conduct. In 2024, the same periodical interviewed Ōtsuka Umio, then just appointed chief priest at Yasukuni, who departed from his recent predecessors' endorsement of the revisionist Yūshūkan history museum on shrine grounds for a more reserved position, opining that it "takes a particular point of view on history, that it is important to decide for yourself whether it is right or wrong." Many Japanese Shintoists are also Buddhist; Japanese Buddhist, Christian and new religious organizations overwhelmingly oppose endorsing Yasukuni in any capacity.

== International political impacts ==
=== People's Republic of China ===
The government of the People's Republic of China has been the most vocal critic of the shrine. Chinese political discourse describes the visits by Japanese political and public figures to the shrine, particularly when those visits occur on the anniversary of Japan's World War II surrender, as "worshipping the devil". In May 2005, in the aftermath of anti-Japanese protests over the Japanese history textbooks controversy, Chinese Vice-Premier Wu Yi cut short her visit to Japan and flew home before a planned meeting with Japanese prime minister Junichiro Koizumi. This was widely interpreted as a reaction to a statement by Koizumi the day before Wu's arrival that foreign countries should not interfere in Japan's domestic affairs, including the Yasukuni issue. Wu's visit was meant to improve strained relations between the two countries following the textbook controversy, and she had planned to ask Koizumi to stop his visits to the shrine.

Some Japanese observers have suggested that the issue of Yasukuni Shrine is just as heavily tied to China's internal politics as it is to the historical conduct of Japan's military and the perceived degree of its remorse for its actions. They state that tolerance on the part of Chinese Communist Party authorities for large-scale public protests in mainland China against the shrine contrasts strongly with the authority exercised against any kind of domestic political dissent.

=== Taiwan ===
A group claiming to represent Taiwanese aborigines led by politician Kao Chin Su-mei attempted to visit Yasukuni Shrine with the sponsorship of the Japan Catholic Council for Justice and Peace. Their intention was to peacefully request the removal of their relatives from the shrine, and to pray for the return of their ancestors' souls. Request to perform religious rites within the Yasukuni property were refused and they were blocked from entering Yasukuni by Japanese protesters and police. A demonstration was organized by a group of more than one hundred Japanese nationalists to block them from the shrine and prevent them from performing spirit-calling religious rituals within the property the Shrine objected. Japanese police allowed the protesters to remain on the grounds because their entrance to the shrine was not objected by the shrine; however they blocked the Taiwanese from leaving their buses, citing measures to prevent clashes between the two groups. After about an hour and a half, the Taiwanese group gave up their attempt. Kao Chin Su-mei and her group reportedly received death threats related to their visit, prompting the Taiwanese government to request Japanese authorities ensure her safety while in Japan.

=== South Korea ===
On his first visit to Japan since leaving office in February 2003, former South Korean President Kim Dae Jung criticized Japanese politicians' visits to the shrine, and proposed that the 14 Class A war criminals be moved to a different location. He said, "If that option is realized, I will not express opposition to visits to Yasukuni Shrine (by Koizumi or other Japanese leaders)". Kim noted that Koizumi promised at a meeting in Shanghai in 2001 to consider building a new memorial facility that could replace Yasukuni Shrine and enable anyone to worship there without hesitation.

== Prime ministerial visits ==
=== Junichiro Koizumi ===
Prime Minister Junichiro Koizumi made widely publicized annual visits to the shrine while in office. The official position of the Japanese government was that he visited as an individual citizen "to express respect and gratitude to the many people who lost their lives in the war," and not for the sake of gratifying war criminals or to dispute the results of the International Military Tribunal for the Far East. Koizumi made his final visit as prime minister on August 15, 2006, shortly before his retirement.

Officials in the People's Republic of China responded to Koizumi's 2005 visit by canceling a scheduled visit to China by Japanese Foreign Minister Nobutaka Machimura in protest. Koizumi's visits also provoked negative reactions in the United States. Henry Hyde, a World War II veteran serving as the Republican chairman of the U.S. House of Representatives Committee on International Relations, wrote a letter to House Speaker Dennis Hastert in May 2006 urging that Koizumi only be allowed to speak at the U.S. Capitol if he agreed not to visit Yasukuni on the following anniversary of Japan's surrender. Hyde's Democratic counterpart Tom Lantos also pressed for an end to the visits, stating that "paying one's respect to war criminals is morally bankrupt and unworthy of a great nation such as Japan."

=== Shinzo Abe ===
Koizumi's successor Shinzo Abe visited the shrine several times before and after his first stint as prime minister, but did not visit at all during his first term as prime minister from September 2006 to September 2007. Abe not visiting the shrine prompted a Japanese nationalist named Yoshihiro Tanjo to cut off his own little finger in protest and mail it to the LDP. In April 2007, he made a ceremonial offering to the shrine, but did not actually visit himself. According to official reports the offering was made by Abe as a private citizen rather than in an official capacity, although it was reported that the card attached to the floral offering was signed Prime Minister Shinzo Abe. Although Abe publicly supported his predecessor's visits to the shrine he did not visit the shrine himself during his term in office.

In August 2007, the 16 members of Abe's cabinet all declared they had no intention of visiting the shrine on the anniversary of the Japanese surrender. Abe, who at this point had not disclosed whether he himself intended to go, commented "Paying homage at the Yasukuni temple, or not, is up to the individual, even for a Cabinet member. I expect people to use their own discretion." Sanae Takaichi, minister in charge of gender equality and Okinawa-related issues, ultimately visited the shrine in an apparent effort to avoid a rare absence of all Cabinet members at Yasukuni on the anniversary of Japan's official World War II surrender.

While campaigning for the presidency of the LDP in 2012, Abe said that he regretted not visiting the shrine while prime minister. He again refrained from visiting the shrine during the first year of his second stint as prime minister in consideration for improving relations with China and Korea, whose leaders refused to meet with Abe during this time. He said on December 9, 2013, that "it is natural that we should express our feelings of respect to the war dead who sacrificed their lives for the nation... but it is my thinking that we should avoid making [Yasukuni visits] political and diplomatic issues." In lieu of visiting, Abe sent ritual offerings to the shrine for festivals in April and October 2013, as well as the anniversary of the end of World War II in August 2013.

On May 19, 2013, Prime Minister Shinzo Abe said in an interview with Foreign Affairs that Yasukuni was comparable to Arlington National Cemetery and that it was natural to visit. The United States responded on October 3 of the same year, when U.S. Secretary of Defense Chuck Hagel and U.S. Secretary of State John Kerry visited Chidorigafuchi National Cemetery, noting that Chidorigafuchi is the most similar facility in Japan to Arlington Cemetery.

Abe's first visit to the shrine and Chinreisha as prime minister took place on December 26, 2013, the first anniversary of his second term in office. It was the first visit to the shrine by a sitting prime minister since Junichiro Koizumi visited in August 2006. Abe said that he "prayed to pay respect for the war dead who sacrificed their precious lives and hoped that they rest in peace," and said he had "no intention to neglect the feelings of the people in China and South Korea." The Chinese government published a protest that day, calling government visits to the shrine "an effort to glorify the Japanese militaristic history of external invasion and colonial rule and to challenge the outcome of World War II." Chinese Ambassador to Japan, Cheng Yonghua, stated in an article published in the Mainichi Shimbun that "Japanese leaders visiting the Yasukuni Shrine concerns their understandings of the aggressive war's nature and responsibility, which absolutely can not be accepted by the Chinese side." The Mainichi Shimbun argued in an editorial that the visit could "cast a dark shadow" on relations with the United States and other countries in addition to China and Korea.

The U.S. government criticized the prime minister on December 12, expressing disappointment that he went ahead with the visit despite Vice President Joe Biden's request that he not visit the Yasukuni Shrine. On December 27, 2013, Catherine Ashton, the EU's foreign policy chief, released a statement saying that the move does nothing to improve relations with its neighbors. On December 29, the Singapore government expressed regret over the Japanese prime minister's visit to Yasukuni Shrine. On January 19, 2014, Taiwanese president Ma Ying-jeou wrote a post on Facebook denouncing shrine visits as rubbing salt in the wound.

As Abe visited the shrine, China's UN Ambassador Liu Jieyi said in taking the issue to the UN: "It all boils down to whether the leader of a country should stand on the side of maintaining the principles and purposes of the charter of the UN or to side with war criminals. The question inevitably arises as to what Abe is up to, where does he intend to take his country? The international community should remain vigilant and issue a warning ... that Abe must correct his erroneous outlook of history, he must correct his mistakes and he must not slip further down the wrong path." In response, Japan's UN Ambassador Motohide Yoshikawa said: "Abe visited Yasukuni Shrine to pay his respects and pray for the souls of the war dead and renew the pledge that Japan shall never again wage war. It was nothing more and nothing less."

=== Other prime ministers ===
In the wake of Abe's first term, his successor Yasuo Fukuda vowed never to visit the shrine. Fukuda's open political opposition to the shrine led to improved relations with China, North and South Korea; however, a group of 62 Diet members from the Liberal Democratic Party and the People's New Party, including former farm minister Yoshinobu Shimamura and Eriko Yamatani, a special adviser to Fukuda, visited the shrine on April 22, 2008. The Democratic Party of Japan governments between 2009 and 2012 also avoided the shrine. Yukio Hatoyama pledged not to visit so long as war criminals are enshrined there. Naoto Kan ordered the entire cabinet not to visit the shrine on the anniversary of Japan's surrender, and said he had no plans to visit personally. Yoshihiko Noda stated in his first press conference that his cabinet would continue the policy of not making official visits. In 2022, Fumio Kishida sent an offering to the shrine, but did not visit himself. On April 21, 2023, Prime Minister Kishida sent a religious offering to the site.

== Emperor Shōwa's visits ==
Emperor Hirohito did not visit Yasukuni from 1978 until his death. His son, Emperor Akihito, has not visited the shrine since becoming emperor (and has since continued after his abdication in 2019), instead choosing to send a lesser member of the royal household. Emperor Naruhito (Shōwa's grandson) does not visit the shrine, and sends a lesser member of the royal house as his father did. On July 20, 2006, Nihon Keizai Shimbun front-paged an article about the discovery of a memorandum detailing the reason Emperor Hirohito stopped visiting Yasukuni. The memorandum, kept by former chief of Imperial Household Agency Tomohiko Tomita, confirms for the first time the enshrinement of Class A War Criminals such as Yosuke Matsuoka and Toshio Shiratori was the reason. Tomita wrote down the contents of his conversations with the emperor in his diaries and notebooks in detail. He left 12 diaries (1975–1986) and some 20 notebooks (1986–1997).

According to the memorandum, the emperor Hirohito expressed his anger and strong displeasure in 1988 at the decision made by Yasukuni Shrine to include Class A war criminals in the list of war dead honored there by saying, "At some point, Class-A criminals became enshrined, including Matsuoka and Shiratori. I heard Tsukuba acted cautiously." Tsukuba is believed to refer to Fujimaro Tsukuba, the former chief Yasukuni priest at the time, who decided not to enshrine the war criminals despite receiving, in 1966, the list of war dead compiled by the government containing their names. "What's on the mind of Matsudaira's son, who is the current head priest? Matsudaira had a strong wish for peace, but the child didn't know the parent's heart. That's why I have not visited the shrine since. This is my heart." Matsudaira is believed to refer to Yoshitami Matsudaira, who was the grand steward of Imperial Household immediately after the end of World War II. His son, Nagayoshi, succeeded Fujimaro Tsukuba as the chief priest of Yasukuni and he decided to enshrine the war criminals in 1978. Nagayoshi Matsudaira had died the previous year (July 10, 2005), which is speculated as a reason for the release of the memo.

For journalist Masanori Yamaguchi, who analyzed the "memo" and comments made by the emperor in his first-ever press conference in 1975, his evasive and opaque attitude about his own responsibility for the war and the fact that he said that the bombing of Hiroshima "could not be helped", could mean that he was afraid that the enshrinement would reignite the debate over his own responsibility for the war. Another commentator stated that there are three immediate impacts of the memo. Firstly, the explanation of the suspension of the imperial visit offered by the right is no longer sustainable. Those on the right of Japanese politics had attributed the reason for the emperor's suspension of visits to the emergence of controversy over constitutional validity of the visit by the prime minister or the emperor in regard to the separation of state and religion. This claim is no longer valid in the light of the revelation. Secondly, Yasukuni and its lay organization Izokukai probably have to make alterations to their stance somewhat. Both organizations have clearly expressed their wish for a visit by the current emperor. Recent rulings by the Supreme Court have also indicated that visits by the prime minister or the emperor are constitutional; however, it is now clear that the controversy over the enshrinement of class A war criminals has to be resolved. Moreover, although the emperor is the highest authority of Shinto, he does not exercise direct control of any Shinto shrine including Yasukuni, whose ideology is clearly in favor of the pre-war arrangement in which the emperor was the official head of Shinto. Thirdly, the revelation clearly shifts the focus of the controversy to the enshrinement of class A war criminals, meaning that the issue of the separation between the state and the church is no longer the main focus. The public opinion is split between those on the left who advocate for the removal and those on the right who nonetheless object to the removal.

== Visits by media figures ==
On January 7, 2019, the official Twitter account for Creatures, one of the co-owners of the Pokémon franchise, posted an image depicting multiple employees visiting Yasukuni Shrine. The tweet was deleted shortly after due to backlash from Chinese and South Korean Twitter users, which included calls for a boycott.

In 2021, anti-fans of Chinese actor-singer Zhang Zhehan circulated a photo of him taken three years earlier in front of cherry trees with the shrine visible in the background. Zhang responded with a public statement expressing regret for his ignorance and reaffirming his patriotism. Social media criticism of Zhang followed, with some members of the public contended that Zhang was a hanjian (national traitor). Social media users left comments on the accounts of brands Zhang endorsed in which they questioned Zhang's political loyalties, and more than 20 brands ended their commercial relationships as a result of the public response. Chinese music platforms removed his songs and the video platform Youku removed his name from the credits of dramas in which he had appeared. The China Association of Performing Arts boycotted Zhang, stating that matters of national history should be considered common sense for Chinese celebrities and could not be excused by ignorance. Weibo banned his account, his studio's account, his fan club, and his super topic. The Central Commission for Discipline Inspection issued a commentary stating, "China is firmly opposed to all 'devil worship,' if our domestic political figures are not condemned and held accountable for going to the Yasukuni Shrine, how can we stand up straight and ask foreigners not to go?" Chinese public and government reactions to the Zhang photos were intensified by the fact that during the public controversy, Japan Defense Minister Kishi Nobuo visited the shrine.

On 11 February 2021, Japanese voice actress Ai Kayano claimed that she had taken a trip to visit Yasukuni Shrine, located near her workplace, which upset many citizens of nations that Japan had victimized during its imperialistic era. She apologized afterwards, saying that she was unaware of the controversy on the enshrinement of war criminals in the shrine. A few months after her visit, amid significant pressure from Chinese fans, some Chinese video games such as Azur Lane and Arknights had removed her voice work from their games in the Chinese server.

== Attacks ==
=== Cyber attacks ===
Beginning with Prime Minister Junichiro Koizumi's annual visits to the shrine, the shrine experienced regular cyber attacks in the early 2000s. These attacks have been found to originate from Chinese servers in China and involve Chinese-language spam with viruses. These attacks serve two functions. They spam the Yasukuni shrine webpage to overwhelm them and basically prevent them from being accessible. Some of these attacks reached as high as 15,000 pings per second. Cyber attacks against the shrine have also included sending mass emails that appear to have originated from the shrine with viruses to third parties.

=== December 2011 arson attack ===
On December 26, 2011, a man attempted to burn down a 13-meter high gate column at Yasukuni. The incident was captured on video and the fire quickly put out by security staff. Japanese police gained an arrest warrant for a 37-year-old Chinese man, who had been arrested earlier the same month for throwing Molotov cocktails at the Japanese embassy in Seoul. The man, Liu Qiang, served a 10-month sentence in South Korea for the embassy attack. Japan formally asked South Korea to extradite him, and China informally requested repatriation of their citizen. Liu stated that he was motivated by "antihumanitarian acts by militaristic Japan," and said that his (South Korean) maternal grandmother had been a sex slave for Japanese soldiers during the war and his great-grandfather had been tortured to death for protesting. On January 3, 2013, the Seoul High Court declined Japan's extradition request, and on the following day Liu returned to China.

=== November 2015 bombing ===
On November 23, 2015, at around 10 am, a restroom near the shrine's southern entrance was damaged by a bomb explosion. Chon Chang-han, a South Korean man, was arrested on December 9.

=== May 2024 defacing ===
On May 31, 2024, Dong Guangming, a Chinese netizen identified as "Tietou" (鐵頭) on social media, posted a video of urinating and spray painting "toilet" at Yasukuni Shrine. Dong described his motivation was the Japanese government's permission to "discharge nuclear wastewater". Police have arrested Jiang Zhuojun, one of Dong's collaborators, while Dong and Hsu Lai-Yu, the other collaborator, fled to China. Jiang pleaded guilty in the trial and sentenced eight months in prison.

== See also ==
- Controversies regarding the role of the Emperor of Japan
