= Historical kana orthography =

Use of Japan's syllabic scripts before 1946

The kana orthography in general use for writing the Japanese language until orthographic reforms after World War II is referred to as historical kana orthography (歴史的仮名遣い, rekishiteki kanazukai) or old orthography (旧仮名遣い, kyū kanazukai). The current orthography was adopted by Cabinet order in 1946. By that point the historical orthography was no longer in accord with Japanese pronunciation. It differs from modern usage (現代仮名遣い, gendai kanazukai) in the number of characters and the way those characters are used. There was considerable opposition to the official adoption of the current orthography, on the grounds that the historical orthography conveys meanings better, and some writers continued to use it for many years after.

The historical orthography is found in almost all Japanese dictionaries, such as Kōjien. In the current edition of the Kōjien, if the historical orthography is different from the modern spelling, the old spelling is printed in tiny katakana between the modern kana and kanji transcriptions of the word. Ellipses are used to save space when the historical and modern spellings are identical. Older editions of the Kōjien gave priority to the historical orthography.

The historical orthography should not be confused with hentaigana, alternative kana that were declared obsolete with the orthographic reforms of 1900.

== General differences ==
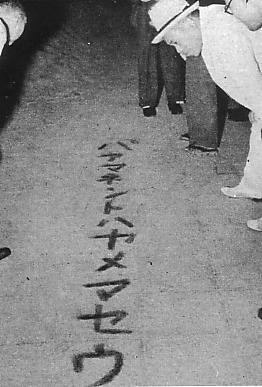
A 1940 Japanese Empire propaganda slogan: パアマネントハヤメマセウ (Pāmanento wa yamemashō, "Stop the permanent wave"), with yamemashō written as yamemaseu.

In historical kana usage:

- Two kana are used that are obsolete today: ゐ/ヰ wi and ゑ/ヱ we. These are today read as i and e. Words that formerly contained those characters are now written using い/イ i and え/エ e respectively.
- Outside of its use as a particle, the を wo kana is used to represent the o sound in some, but not all, words.
- Yōon sounds, such as しょう shō or きょう kyō, are not written with a small kana (ゃ, ゅ, ょ); depending on the word, they are written with either two or three full-sized kana. If written with two kana and the last one is や ya, ゆ yu, or よ yo, then it represents a short syllable of one mora, such as きよ kyo. If written with two or three kana and the last one is う u or ふ fu, then it represents a long syllable of two morae. The first kana is not always the same as one used in the modern spelling, as in 今日 kyō "today", written けふ kefu. If written with three kana, the middle one will always be や ya, ゆ yu, or よ yo, and the last kana will always be う u or ふ fu, as in 丁 chō, the counter for tools, guns, etc., written ちやう chiyau.
- The series of kana ha hi fu he ho are used to represent, in some words, the sounds wa, i, u, e, o, respectively.
- Precedence is given to grammar over pronunciation. For example, the verb warau (to laugh) is written わらふ warafu, and in accordance with Japanese grammar rules, waraō, the volitional form of warau, is written わらはう warahau.
- The kana づ du and ぢ di, which are mostly only used in rendaku in modern kana usage, are more common. Modern kana usage replaces them with the identically pronounced ず zu and じ ji in most cases. For example, ajisai (hortensia) is written あぢさゐ adisawi.

Most of the historical kana usage has been found to accurately represent certain aspects of the way words sounded during the Heian period. As the spoken language has continued to develop, some orthography looks odd to the modern eye. As these peculiarities follow fairly regular patterns, they are not difficult to learn. However, some of the historical kana usages are etymologically mistakes. For example,

或いは aruiwa (or) might be found written incorrectly as 或ひは *aruhiwa or 或ゐは *aruwiwa
用ゐる mochiwiru (use) might be found written incorrectly as 用ひる *mochihiru
つくえ tsukue (desk, table) might be found written incorrectly as: つくゑ *tsukuwe

Those familiar with Japanese writing may notice that most of the differences apply to words which are usually written in Kanji anyway, and so would require no changes to switch from one Kana system to another (unless furigana are employed). In particular, yōon sounds occur almost exclusively in the Chinese-derived readings that are usually only seen in Kanji compounds (although not entirely; 今日 kyō "today," written けふ kefu in the old system, is a native Japanese word), and therefore do not look any different (without furigana). The relative lack of difference in appearance in practice between the two systems was a major reason the spelling reform succeeded, and also why the three grammatical particles o, e, wa continue to be written as を wo, へ he, and は ha instead of お o, え e, and わ wa; many felt that changing these exceedingly common spellings would unnecessarily confuse readers. It is also for this reason that many character dictionaries continue to include the historical spellings, since they are relevant there.

Some forms of unusual kana usage are not, in fact, historical kana usage. For example, writing どじょう (泥鰌/鰌) dojō (loach, a sardine-like fish) in the form どぜう dozeu is not historical kana usage (which was どぢやう dodiyau), but a kind of slang writing originating in the Edo period.

== Examples ==
Here are some representative examples showing the historical and modern spellings and the kanji representation.

Historical usage		Current usage		New	Old	Translation	Middle Chinese
けふ	kefu	きょう	kyō	今日		today	
かは	kaha	かわ	kawa	川		river	
こゑ	kowe	こえ	koe	声	聲	voice	
みづ	midu	みず	mizu	水		water	
わう	wau	おう	ō	王		king	hjwang
てふ	tefu	ちょう	chō	蝶		butterfly	dep
ゐる	wiru	いる	iru	居る		there is/are (animate)	
あはれ	ahare	あわれ	aware	哀れ		sorrow; grief; pathos	
かへる	kaheru	かえる	kaeru	帰る	歸る	to return home	
くわし	kuwashi (kwashi)	かし	kashi	菓子		sweets	kwaX tsiX
とうきやう	Toukiyau (Toukyau)	とうきょう	Tōkyō	東京		Tokyo	tuwng kjaeng
せう	seu	しょう	shō	笑		laughter	sjewH

The table at the bottom gives a more complete list of the changes in spelling patterns.

== Current usage ==
Historical kana usage can be used to look up words in larger dictionaries and dictionaries specializing in old vocabulary, which are in print in Japan. Because of the great discrepancy between the pronunciation and spelling and the widespread adoption of modern kana usage, historical kana usage is almost never seen, except in a few special cases. Companies, shrines and people occasionally use historical kana conventions such as ゑびす (Ebisu), notably in Yebisu beer, which is written ヱビス webisu but pronounced ebisu. Also, some long-standing company names retain yōon in full-sized kana, like キヤノン (Canon) or stamp manufacturer シヤチハタ (Shachihata).

The Jinja Shinpō uses historical kana orthography in the name of protecting tradition, the only newspaper in Japan to do so according to the publisher.

In addition, alternate kana letterforms, known as hentaigana (変体仮名), have nearly disappeared. A few uses remain, such as kisoba, often written using obsolete kana on the signs of soba shops.

The use of を wo, へ he, and は ha instead of お o, え e, and わ wa for the grammatical particles o, e, wa is a remnant of historical kana usage.

== Table of differences ==
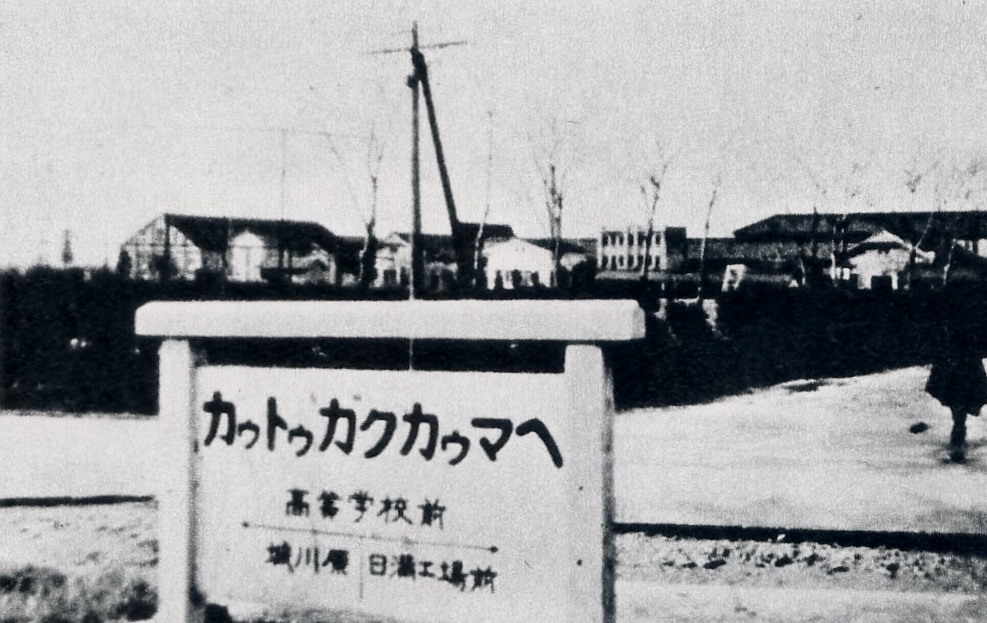
Pre-War sign for Kōtōgakkō-mae (高等学校前) station in Toyama, spelled out as Ka_{u}to_{u}kakuka_{u}mahe.

The following tables summarize every possible historical spelling for the syllables which were spelled differently under the historical system. When more than one historical spelling is given for a particular modern spelling, the various historical spellings were etymologically (and at one point phonetically) distinct and occurred in different words (i.e. in most cases, they are not merely different ways to spell the same word). The tables are sorted using the gojūon ordering system. Note that the dakuten (voicing mark) was frequently omitted as well, as in the station sign on the right.

Word-medial は ha, ひ hi, ふ hu, へ he, and ほ ho		ゐ wi, ゑ we and を wo		くゎ kwa and ぐゎ gwa		Yotsugana		Sokuon		Classical auxiliary verb ～む -mu	
Modern	Historical	Modern	Historical	Modern	Historical	Modern	Historical	Modern	Historical	Modern	Historical
わ wa	わ wa, は ha	い i	い i, ゐ wi	か ka	か ka, くわ kuwa	じ ji	じ zi, ぢ di	っ	き ki, く ku, ち ti, つ tu	ん n	む mu
い i	い i, ひ hi	え e	え e, ゑ we	が ga	が ga, ぐわ guwa	ず zu	ず zu, づ du				
う u	う u, ふ hu	お o	お o, を wo								
え e	え e, へ he										
お o	お o, ほ ho										

～おう -ō (chōon)
Modern spelling	Historical spellings
おう ō	あう au, あふ ahu, おう ou, おふ ohu, わう wau, わふ wahu, をう wou, をふ wohu
こう kō	かう kau, かふ kahu, くわう kuwau, こう kou, こふ kohu
ごう gō	がう gau, がふ gahu, ぐわう guwau, ごう gou, ごふ gohu
そう sō	さう sau, さふ sahu, そう sou, そふ sohu
ぞう zō	ざう zau, ざふ zahu, ぞう zou, ぞふ zohu
とう tō	たう tau, たふ tahu, とう tou, とふ tohu
どう dō	だう dau, だふ dahu, どう dou, どふ dohu
ほう hō	はう hau, はふ hahu, ほう hou, ほふ hohu
ぼう bō	ばう bau, ばふ bahu, ぼう bou, ぼふ bohu
ぽう pō	ぱう pau, ぱふ pahu, ぽう pou, ぽふ pohu
のう nō	なう nau, なふ nahu, のう nou, のふ nohu
もう mō	まう mau, まふ mahu, もう mou, もふ mohu
ろう rō	らう rau, らふ rahu, ろう rou, ろふ rohu

～ゃ -ya (yōon)
Modern spelling	Historical spelling(s)
きゃ kya	きや kiya
ぎゃ gya	ぎや giya
しゃ sha	しや siya
じゃ ja	じや ziya, ぢや diya
ちゃ cha	ちや tiya
ぢゃ ja	ぢや diya
にゃ nya	にや niya
ひゃ hya	ひや hiya
びゃ bya	びや biya
ぴゃ pya	ぴや piya
みゃ mya	みや miya
りゃ rya	りや riya

～ゅ -yu (yōon)
Modern spelling	Historical spelling(s)
きゅ kyu	きゆ kiyu
ぎゅ gyu	ぎゆ giyu
しゅ shu	しゆ siyu
じゅ ju	じゆ ziyu, ぢゆ diyu
ちゅ chu	ちゆ tiyu
ぢゅ ju	ぢゆ diyu
にゅ nyu	にゆ niyu
ひゅ hyu	ひゆ hiyu
びゅ byu	びゆ biyu
ぴゅ pyu	ぴゆ piyu
みゅ myu	みゆ miyu
りゅ ryu	りゆ riyu

～ょ -yo (yōon)
Modern spelling	Historical spelling(s)
きょ kyo	きよ kiyo
ぎょ gyo	ぎよ giyo
しょ sho	しよ siyo
じょ jo	じよ ziyo, ぢよ diyo
ちょ cho	ちよ tiyo
ぢょ jo	ぢよ diyo
にょ nyo	によ niyo
ひょ hyo	ひよ hiyo
びょ byo	びよ biyo
ぴょ pyo	ぴよ piyo
みょ myo	みよ miyo
りょ ryo	りよ riyo

～ゅう -yū (yōchōon)
Modern spelling	Historical spellings
きゅう kyū	きう kiu, きふ kihu, きゆう kiyuu
ぎゅう gyū	ぎう giu, ぎふ gihu, ぎゆう giyuu
しゅう shū	しう siu, しふ sihu, しゆう siyuu
じゅう jū	じう ziu, じふ zihu, じゆう ziyuu ぢう diu, ぢふ dihu, ぢゆう diyuu
ちゅう chū	ちう tiu, ちふ tihu, ちゆう tiyuu
ぢゅう jū	ぢう diu, ぢふ dihu, ぢゆう diyuu
にゅう nyū	にう niu, にふ nihu, にゆう niyuu
ひゅう hyū	ひう hiu, ひふ hihu, ひゆう hiyuu
びゅう byū	びう biu, びふ bihu, びゆう biyuu
ぴゅう pyū	ぴう piu, ぴふ pihu, ぴゆう piyuu
みゅう myū	みう miu, みふ mihu, みゆう miyuu
ゆう yū	いう iu, いふ ihu, ゆう yuu, ゆふ yuhu
りゅう ryū	りう riu, りふ rihu, りゆう riyuu

～ょう -yō (yōchōon)
Modern spelling	Historical spellings
きょう kyō	けう keu, けふ kehu, きやう kiyau, きよう kiyou
ぎょう gyō	げう geu, げふ gehu, ぎやう giyau, ぎよう giyou
しょう shō	せう seu, せふ sehu, しやう siyau, しよう siyou
じょう jō	ぜう zeu, ぜふ zehu, じやう ziyau, じよう ziyou でう deu, でふ dehu, ぢやう diyau, ぢよう diyou
ちょう chō	てう teu, てふ tehu, ちやう tiyau, ちよう tiyou
ぢょう jō	でう deu, でふ dehu, ぢやう diyau, ぢよう diyou
にょう nyō	ねう neu, ねふ nehu, にやう niyau, によう niyou
ひょう hyō	へう heu, へふ hehu, ひやう hiyau, ひよう hiyou
びょう byō	べう beu, べふ behu, びやう biyau, びよう biyou
ぴょう pyō	ぺう peu, ぺふ pehu, ぴやう piyau, ぴよう piyou
みょう myō	めう meu, めふ mehu, みやう miyau, みよう miyou
よう yō	えう eu, えふ ehu, やう yau, よう you
りょう ryō	れう reu, れふ rehu, りやう riyau, りよう riyou

=== Notes ===
- The spellings in the first table only apply to word-medial kana: word-initial occurrences of わ, い, う, え, and お were never written as は, ひ, ふ, へ, or ほ, respectively.
- In modern Japanese orthography, ぢ (di) is only used in compound words where rendaku causes ち (chi) to become voiced, as in はなぢ (鼻血 hanaji "nosebleed"), and where it immediately follows a ち, as in ちぢむ (縮む chijimu "shrink"). Its use in rendaku is retained in order to avoid confusion about the origin of the compound. The usage of づ (du) in modern orthography is the same, used in rendaku and after a つ (tsu). In historical kana, however, ぢ and づ were sometimes used where じ and ず are used in modern kana. This originally represented a different phoneme (and still does in some dialects), but no longer does in Standard Japanese. The historical-kana-only spellings using ぢ and づ are listed under modern spellings starting with じ and ず respectively.
- The different spellings for the sokuon depend on what mora (if any) was elided into the following consonant to form the geminate consonant. For example, 学期 (gakki "semester") is spelled がくき (gakuki) in historical kana because the on'yomi of 学 used in this compound is がく (gaku). Geminate consonants in native Japanese words were formed either by the elision of a long vowel, as in 真赤な (makka-na "bright red"; once まあかな, maaka-na), or by some random process, as in 屹度 (kitto "surely"; once きと, kito); such words are written with the full-size つ (tu) in historical kana. In general, a Japanese on'yomi can end in either a vowel, ん, ち, つ, き, or く, (ち and つ corresponding to Middle Chinese final -t, and き and く corresponding to Middle Chinese final -k), so these are the only four kana (ち, つ, き, く) which can replace the sokuon in historical kana. Historically, on'yomi could also end with pu (for the Middle Chinese final -p), which was written as ふ (pu, later fu) but eventually came to be pronounced u (as part of a diphthong).
- The last table in the first row applies only to the terminal (終止形 shūshikei) and attributive (連体形 rentaikei) forms of the classical auxiliary verb ～む (-mu), which are pronounced ん (n). While many other native Japanese words (for example, 汝 nanji archaic word for "you") with ん were once pronounced and/or written with む (mu), proper historical kana only uses む for ん in the case of the auxiliary verb, which is only used in classical Japanese, and has morphed into the volitional ～う (-u) form in modern Japanese.
- The historical spellings in the second row of tables represent every theoretical representation of their modern counterpart. It is possible, however, that some may not have occurred, or that they were so rare that they applied to only one or two words. It is also possible that some spellings listed in the modern spellings column may not occur in any Japanese word, but they are theoretically possible and may occur in onomatopoeia or in katakana transcriptions of foreign languages.

== Romanization ==
Readers of English occasionally encounter words romanized according to historical kana usage. Here are some examples, with modern romanizations in parentheses:

- Kwannon (Kannon): A Bodhisattva
- Kwaidan (Kaidan), meaning ghost story, the title of a collection of Japanese ghost stories compiled by Lafcadio Hearn
- Kwansei Gakuin University (Kansai): A university in Kobe and Nishinomiya
- Iwo Jima (Iō-jima; now officially Iō-tō): An island known as the site of a battle during World War II
