= Jinja Shinpō =

Weekly Shinto Newspaper

- Native name: 神社新報
- Type: Weekly newspaper
- Publisher: 神社新報社 [Jinja Shinpō-sha]
- Founded: July 8, 1946
- Language: Japanese
- Country: Japan
- Circulation: 50,000 (as of 2024)
- Website: https://www.jinja.co.jp/index.html

Jinja Shinpō (神社新報) is a Japanese language weekly newspaper published by the Association of Shinto Shrines.

== Profile and Content ==
Jinja Shinpō is published every Monday and is distributed to members of the Association of Shinto Shrines, prefectural shrine offices and individual subscribers, including libraries and embassies.

The paper covers many topics including news relating to Shinto, the Association of Shinto Shrines, the Imperial Family of Japan, general religion, sociocultural stories closely related to Shinto, and current affairs commentary from those involved in Shinto. According to the publisher Jinja Shinpō-sha, it adheres to the point of view of "traditional Japanese peoples way of thinking".

It is used by the Association of Shinto Shrines to publicly voice its opinion on matters. It has published articles opposing internet veneration, over 50 editorials calling for reinstatement of the legal status of Palace Rituals and in editorials has often blamed the Occupation of Japan and the "Tokyo War Crimes Trials view of history” for many perceived problems, calling for patriotic instruction in school against a "'masochistic’ understandings of Japan's modern history", opposing recognition and compensation to comfort women in 1992, and raised concerns in 2005 over Emperor Akihito's personal visit to memorials in Saipan commemorating Korean forced labourers and locals that died during the Second World War. The paper has also published many articles against gender equality, including opposing married women's use of their maiden names in 1994, female succession of the Imperial Throne in 2002, the Fundamental Law on Gender Equality between 2001 and 2003, and reporting Takahashi Shirō's claim that women having the right to choose whether to have children threatens Japan's original culture. A 2013 editorial called the government to recognise the effect women's unpaid work has on the GDP in their gender equality indicators.

In 1996 following Emperor Shōwa's death Jinja Shinpō published a New Year's message by Sonoda Minoru calling to recognise Shinto as a cultural religion supporting culture and society, and urged Shinto priests to adapt to urbanisation.

It has also been used in the push to popularise the idea of green shinto.

The paper uses historical kana orthography in the name of protecting tradition, the only paper in Japan to do so according to the publisher.
