= Yasukuni (film) =

2007 Japanese documentary film

- Movie Poster
- Directed by: Li Ying
- Produced by: Li Ying
- Release date: 2007
- Running time: 120 minutes
- Country: Japan
- Language: Japanese

Yasukuni (靖国) is a 2007 film made by Japan-resident Chinese director Li Ying (simplified Chinese: 李缨; traditional Chinese: 李纓; pinyin: Lǐ Yīng). It took ten years to complete and had been screened at the Pusan International Film Festival 2007, World Cinema Competition Sundance Film Festival 2008 and Berlin Film Festival 2008. It also won the best-documentary award at the Hong Kong International Film Festival.

== Synopsis ==
The film looks at the history of Yasukuni Shrine in Chiyoda, Tokyo, where more than 2 million of Japan's war dead are enshrined. More than 1,000 of them are war criminals convicted at the 1946–1948 Tokyo Tribunal, including 14 Class A war criminals, Hideki Tōjō among them. The film not only shows the widely-reported political incidents associated with the shrine but also takes an in-depth look at the shrine's sword-making tradition, the Yasukuni sword being the film's underlying motif. Interspersed with other scenes filmed at the shrine is serene footage of the last living Yasukuni swordsmith, the 90-year-old Naoji Kariya, working on his presumably-final creation.

== Project ==
Li Ying stated that the film was a joint Asian project—the editor was Japanese, as was the cameraman, who had a relative enshrined in Yasukuni. The production received a ¥7.5 million subsidy from the Japan Arts Council in fiscal 2006.

== Reactions ==
Despite the Japanese contribution, the film has generated strong responses in Japan. The first was from right-wing Japanese nationalists, who had the initial screenings in Tokyo and Osaka to be dropped; one of the theatre operators, Humax Cinema Inc., cited safety concerns for its staff. The second was at a special preview on March 12, 2008 for Japanese legislators, arranged by Japan's Agency for Cultural Affairs, and initiated by a group of conservative ruling Liberal Democratic Party members, who questioned the film's objectivity, which is required to receive a public subsidy. Those lawmakers, including Tomomi Inada, called for a boycott of the movie. Third were claims by both Naoji Kariya and Yasukuni Shrine, that the film infringed their portrait rights. The Directors Guild of Japan expressed apprehension about possible infringement of freedom of expression, and as a result of the politicians' protests, only about ten theaters screened the movie—none in Tokyo.

On April 3, 2008, a report from AFP indicated that some regional cinemas in Japan would go ahead with screening the film, defying pressure from nationalists. The Seventh Art Theatre in western Osaka planned to screen the film in May. The report did not identify the two cinema operators from Kyoto and Hiroshima which were mentioned as also planning to screen the same.

The film finally debuted to the public in Japan on May 3, 2008, in Tokyo amidst tight police security. Yutada Okada, president of Argo Pictures, described the sold-out screening as safe and smooth. Movie-goers queued two hours before the first show. Feedback reported from the audience has been positive, describing the film as objective and anti-war, as well as enlightening Japanese citizens about the shrine itself.
