= Controversies regarding the role of the Emperor of Japan =

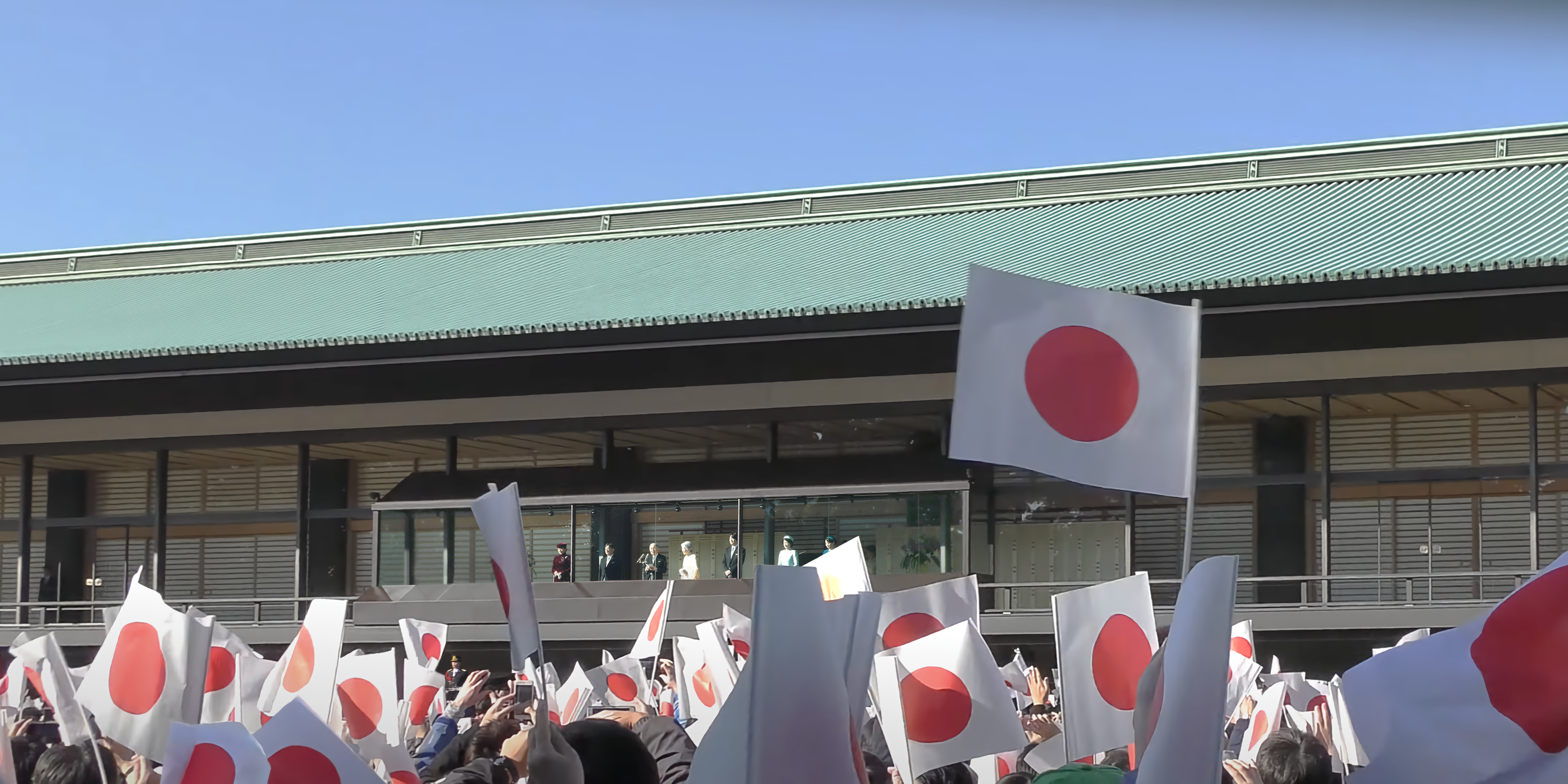
A flag-waving crowd greet Emperor Akihito at the Imperial Palace on his birthday. Photo taken on Dec. 23, 2017.

There have been several controversies regarding the role and the status of the Emperor of Japan. This is due in part to the variety of roles the Emperor has historically filled, as well as the competition for power with other parts of Japanese society at several points in history.

== Meiji Constitution ==
In the Meiji Constitution which occurred in 1889, the emperor was sovereign and was the focus of the state's legitimacy. The preamble stated, "The rights of sovereignty of the State, We have inherited from Our Ancestors, and We shall bequeath them to Our descendants." In the postwar constitution, the emperor's role in the political system was drastically redefined. A prior and important step in this process was Emperor Hirohito's 1946 New Year's speech, made at the prompting of General Douglas MacArthur, renouncing his status as a divine ruler, without however repudiating that he was a descendant of Amaterasu as arahitogami. Hirohito declared that relations between the ruler and his people cannot be based on "the false conception that the emperor is divinity in human form (akitsumikami) or that the Japanese people are superior to other races."

In the first article of the new constitution, the newly "humanized" ruler is described as "the symbol of the State and of the unity of the people, deriving his position from the will of the people with whom resides sovereign power." The authority of the emperor as sovereign in the 1889 constitution was broad and undefined. His functions under the postwar system are narrow, specific, and largely ceremonial, confined to such activities as convening the Diet, bestowing decorations on deserving citizens, and receiving foreign ambassadors (Article 7). He does not possess "powers related to government" (Article 4). The change in the emperor's status was designed to preclude the possibility of military or bureaucratic cliques exercising broad and irresponsible powers "in the emperor's name"—a prominent feature of 1930s extremism. The constitution defines the Diet as the "highest organ of state power" (Article 41), accountable not to the monarch but to the people who elected its members.

== Shōchō ==
The use of the Japanese word shōchō (象徴), meaning symbol, to describe the emperor is unusual and, depending upon one's viewpoint, conveniently or frustratingly vague. The emperor is neither head of state nor sovereign, as are many European constitutional monarchs, although in October 1988 Japan's Ministry of Foreign Affairs claimed, controversially, that the emperor is the country's sovereign in the context of its external relations. Nor does the emperor have an official priestly or religious role. Although he continues to perform ancient Shinto rituals, such as ceremonial planting of the rice crop in spring, he does so in a private capacity.

== Early Shōwa era ==
During the first part of the Shōwa era, according to the Meiji Constitution, the Emperor had the "supreme command of the Army and the Navy" (Article 11). Hirohito was thus legally supreme commander of the Imperial General Headquarters, expanded in 1937 and by which the military decisions were made.

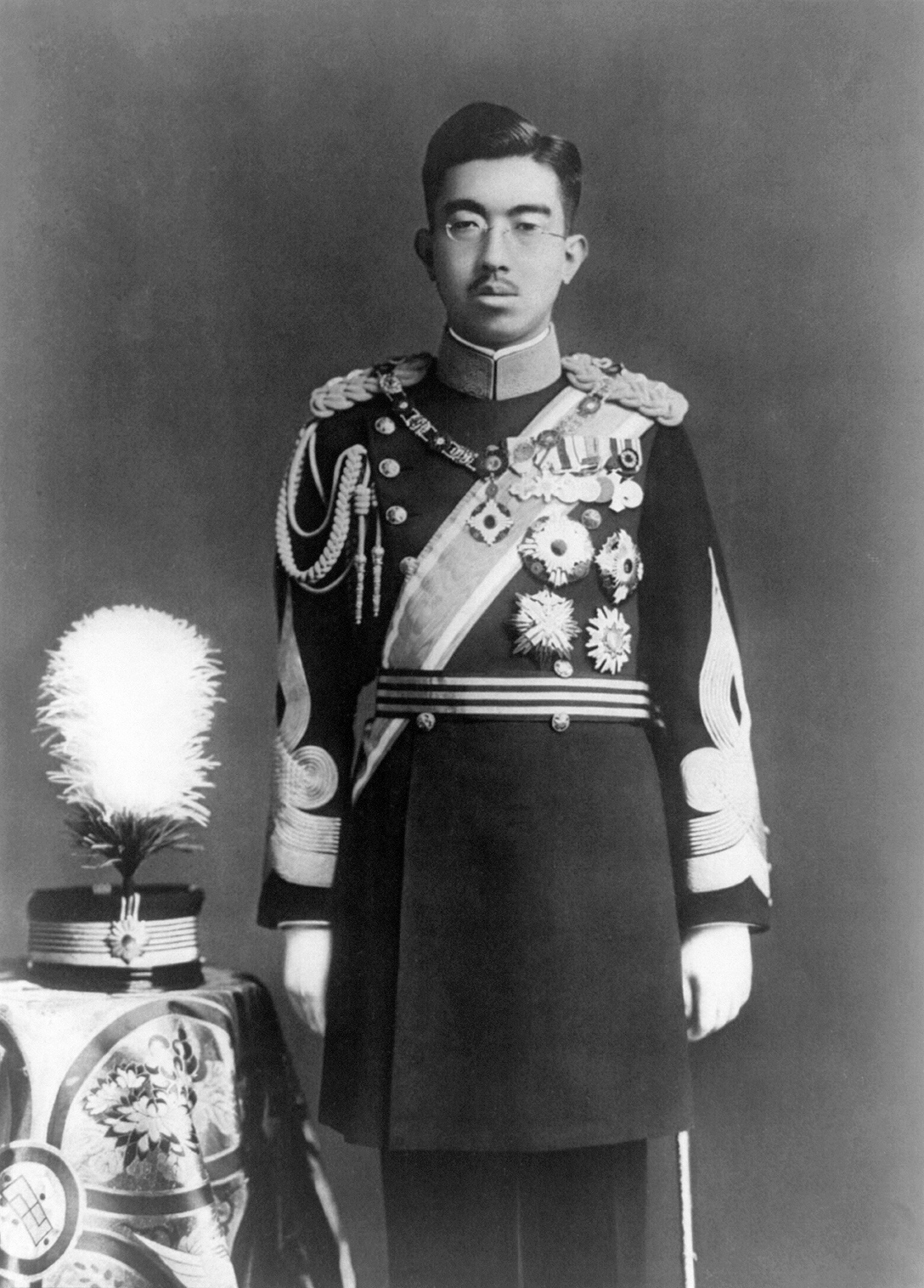
Emperor Shōwa dressed as commander of the Imperial General Headquarters.

The primary sources such as the "Sugiyama memo", and the diaries of Fumimaro Konoe and Koichi Kido, describe in detail the many informal meetings the Emperor had with his chiefs of staff and ministers. These documents show that he was kept informed of all military operations and frequently questioned his senior staff and asked for changes.

According to historians Yoshiaki Yoshimi and Seiya Matsuno, Hirohito authorized by specific orders, transmitted by the Chief of staff of the Army such as Prince Kan'in Kotohito or Hajime Sugiyama, the use of chemical weapons against Chinese civilians and soldiers. For example, he authorized the use of toxic gas on 375 separate occasions during the invasion of Wuhan in 1938. Such weapons were also authorized during the invasion of Changde.

According to historians Akira Fujiwara and Akira Yamada, Hirohito even made major interventions in some military operations. For example, he pressed Sugiyama four times, on January and February 1942, to increase troop strength and launch attack on Bataan. In August 1943, he scolded Sugiyama who could not stop the American advance on the Solomon Islands and asked him to consider other places to attack.

Most of the imperial interventions were made by direct orders such as the crushing of the rebellion during the February 26 Incident. Only in rare moments of special importance, decisions were made in Imperial council. The Imperial government used this special institution to sanction the invasion of China, the Greater East Asia War and to end the war. In 1945, executing the decision approved in Imperial conference, Emperor Shōwa for the first and last time directly ordered via recorded radio broadcast to all of Japan, as his last role as commander-in-chief, the surrender to United States forces.

== Imperial Household Law and Constitutional Law ==
The imperial crest

Laws relating to the imperial house must be approved by the Diet. Under the old system, the Imperial Household Law was separate from and equal with the constitution. After the war, the imperial family's extensive estates were confiscated and its finances placed under control of the Imperial Household Agency, part of the Office of the Prime Minister and theoretically subject to the Diet. In practice it remains a bastion of conservatism, its officials shrouding the activities of the emperor and his family behind a "chrysanthemum curtain" (the chrysanthemum being the crest of the imperial house) to maintain an aura of sanctity. Despite knowledge of his illness among the press corps and other observers, details about the late Emperor Hirohito's state of health in 1988 and 1989 were tightly controlled.

The emperor's constitutional status became a focus of renewed public attention following news of Hirohito's serious illness in late 1988. Crown Prince Akihito became the first person to ascend the throne under the postwar system. One important symbolic issue was the choice of a new reign title under the nengo system which enumerates years beginning with the first year of a monarch's reign. Thus 1988 was Shōwa 63, the sixty-third year of the reign of Hirohito, the Shōwa Emperor. The accession of a new monarch is marked by the naming of a new era that consists of two auspicious Chinese characters. Shōwa (昭和), for example, means bright harmony. Critics deplored the secrecy with which such titles were chosen in the past, the decision being left to a government-appointed committee of experts, and advocated public discussion of the choice as a reflection of Japan's democratic values. Although the nengo system was accorded official status by a bill the Diet passed in June 1979, some favored the system's abandonment altogether in favor of the Western calendar. But on January 7, 1989, the day of Hirohito's death, the government announced that Heisei (平成, Achieving Peace) was the new era name. The first year of Heisei thus was 1989, and all official documents were so dated.

Still more controversial were the ceremonies held in connection with the late emperor's funeral and the new emperor's accession. State support of these activities would have violated Article 20 of the constitution on the separation of state and religious activities. Rightists, such as members of the Society to Protect Japan (Nihon o Mamoru Kai), a nationwide lobbying group, demanded full public support of the ceremonies as expression of the people's love for their monarch. Walking a tightrope between pro-constitution and rightist groups, the government chose to divide Hirohito's state funeral, held February 24, 1989, into official and religious components. Akihito's accession to the throne in November 1990 also had religious (Shinto) and secular components: the Sokuino rei (即位の礼), or Enthronement Ceremony, was secular; the Daijōsai (大嘗祭), or Great Thanksgiving Festival, traditionally, a communion between the new monarch and the gods in which the monarch himself became a deity, was religious. The government's decision to use public funds not only for the Sokui-no-rei but also for the Daijosai, justified in terms of the "public nature" of both ceremonies, was seen by religious and opposition groups as a serious violation of Article 20.

In the early 1990s, an array of such symbolic political issues brought attention to the state's role in religious or quasireligious activities. Defenders of the constitution, including Japanese Christians, followers of new religions, leftists, and many members of the political opposition, considered any government involvement in religious aspects of the enthronement to be a conservative attempt to undermine the spirit, if not the letter, of the constitution. They also strongly criticized the 1989 Ministry of Education, Science, and Culture's controversial directive, which called for the playing of the prewar national anthem ("Kimigayo," or "The Sovereign's Reign") and display of the rising sun flag (Hinomaru, the use of which dates to the early nineteenth century) at public school ceremonies. Although since the late 1950s these activities had been described by the ministry as "desirable," neither had legal status under the postwar constitution.

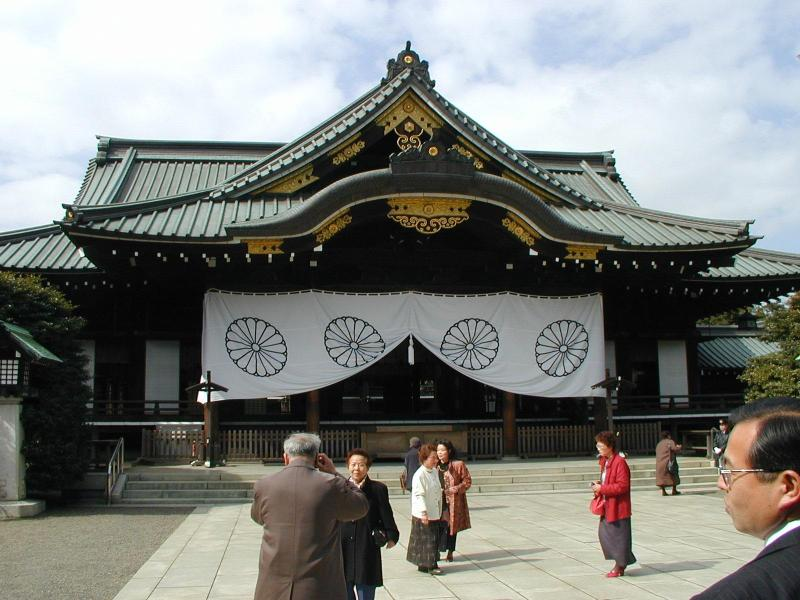
The main building of Yasukuni Shrine

Another issue was state support for the Yasukuni Shrine. This shrine, located in Tokyo near the Imperial Palace, was established during the Meiji era as a repository for the souls of soldiers and sailors who died in battle, thus a holy place rather than simply a war memorial. Conservatives introduced bills five times during the 1970s to make it a "national establishment," but none was adopted. On the fortieth anniversary of the end of World War II in Japan, on August 15, 1985, Prime Minister Nakasone Yasuhiro and members of his cabinet visited the shrine in an official capacity, an action viewed as a renewed conservative effort, outside the Diet, to invest the shrine with official status.

Despite the veneer of Westernization and Article 20's prohibition of state support of the emperor's religious or ceremonial activities, his postwar role was in some ways more like that of traditional rather than prewar emperors. Contrary to early Shōwa era (1926–1945), during the Meiji (1868–1912) and Taishō (1912–1926) eras, the emperor himself was not actively involved in politics. His political authority, however, was immense, and military and bureaucratic elites acted in his name. The "symbolic" role of the emperor after 1945, however, recalled feudal Japan, where political power was monopolized and exercised by the shoguns, and where the imperial court carried on a leisurely, apolitical existence in the traditional capital of Kyoto and served as patrons of culture and the arts.

In 2007, a member of the Imperial Family, Prince Tomohito said of the Royals' role, "If you ask me what the imperial family is all about, and I think and think and think about it, the very final conclusion is that our meaning lies in our simply existing". The royals, he said, could fulfill their duties simply by "waking up in the morning, eating breakfast, eating lunch, eating dinner, then going to sleep, repeating that 365 days a year."
