= Chinreisha =

Shinto shrine in Tokyo, Japan

Chinreisha 鎮霊社
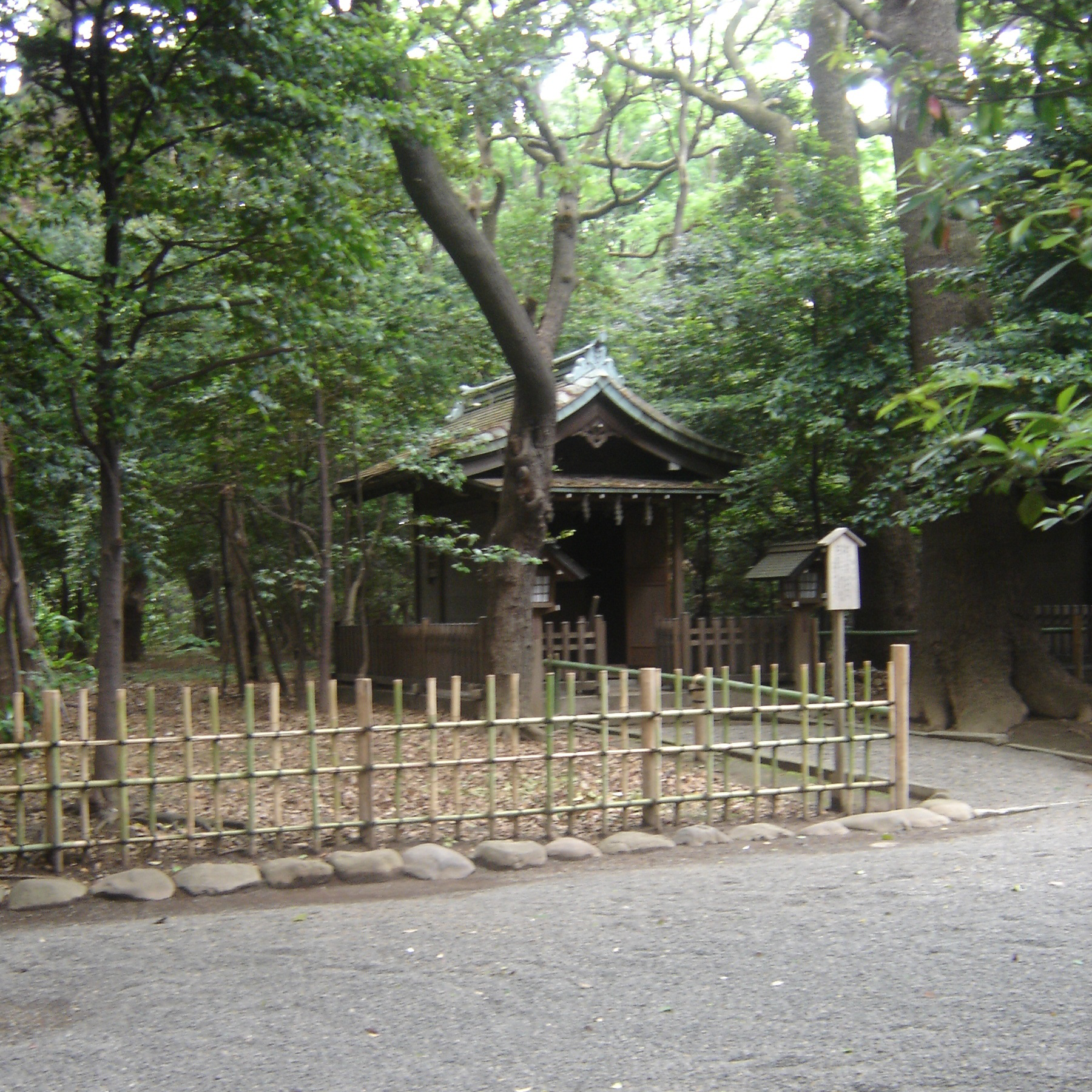

- Location within Japan

Religion
- Affiliation: Shinto
- Deity: War dead
- Type: Imperial Shrine

Location
- Coordinates: 35°41′36.92″N 139°44′35″E

Architecture
- Founder: Fujimaro Tsukuba
- Established: 1965

Chinreisha (鎮霊社, "Spirit Pacifying Shrine") is a small wooden Shinto shrine located directly south of Yasukuni Shrine's honden (main shrine) in Yasukuni Shrine precinct. It was built in 1965 after a proposition by Yasukuni's main priest, Fujimaro Tsukuba and has an annual festival held on July 13. In 1975, a steel fence was erected around the shrine and it was closed off to the public. This came after an incident on Hokkaidō a year earlier where a shrine was set on fire and after the chief priest at Yasukuni had received intelligence that unknown persons were planning to destroy the Chinreisha. It was re-opened for worshipers on October 12, 2006, to spread the spirit of cherishing allies and enemies alike and remembering all the war dead around the world.

The shrine consists of two za, or seats for kami (spirits). One is devoted to all of the Japanese war-dead since 1853 that are not enshrined in Yasukuni Shrine's honden (main shrine). These kami include Japanese men who died fighting against the Imperial Japanese Army in domestic incidents such as the Boshin War. The second za is dedicated to all war dead, regardless of nationality. This is said to include, for example, even the victims affected and killed by Japan during the war. This enshrined kami in the Chinreisha stand in contrast to those enshrined in Yasukuni's honden because they include enemies of Imperial Japan, while Yasukuni Shrine's honden does not.

== Controversy ==
The controversy regarding Chinreisha arose with the Japanese Prime minister Shinzo Abe's visit to the Yasukuni shrine on December 26, 2013. However, in an official statement, Abe stated that he "also visited Chinreisha, a remembrance memorial to pray for the souls of all the people regardless of nationalities who lost their lives in the war" and that he "renewed [his] determination before the souls of the war dead to firmly uphold the pledge never to wage a war again", despite the criticism of many media reports that saw the visit as a reminder of Japanese imperialism. In fact, the Sankei Shimbun, a Japanese newspaper, reported that Abe's visit to "not only the Yasukuni shrine, but also the Chinreisha shrine shows his determination to world peace", and criticized the foreign media for only emphasizing the Prime Minister's visit to the Yasukuni shrine, and not shedding enough light on his visit to Chinreisha. Nevertheless, most of the public opinion slanted toward blaming Abe's visit as an offensive act, rather than interpreting it as an act of historical reflection.
