= Directors Guild of Japan =

Trade union for film directors in Japan

The Directors Guild of Japan (日本映画監督協会, Nihon Eiga Kantoku Kyōkai) is a trade union created to represent the interests of film directors in the film industry in Japan. It was founded in 1936, with Minoru Murata serving as the first president, and has continued to this day apart from a period between 1943 and 1949 when it was disbanded at first on orders from the government. It is particularly concerned with protecting the copyright and other rights the director has over the work, defending freedom of expression, and promoting the economic interests of its members. For instance, it has issued protests against efforts to prevent screenings of such films as Yasukuni and The Cove. The Guild also produced the film Eiga kantoku tte nan da ("What Is a Film Director?") on the occasion of its 70th anniversary to promote its view that the director possesses the copyright of a film.

It also gives out an annual New Directors Award.

The current president is Katsuhide Motoki (2022–). Past presidents were Minoru Murata (1936–37), Kenji Mizoguchi (1937–43, 1949–55), Yasujirō Ozu (1955–63), Heinosuke Gosho (1964–80), Nagisa Ōshima (1980–96), Kinji Fukasaku (1996–2003), Yōji Yamada (2003–04) and Yōichi Sai (2004–2022).
