= Nitta Kuniteru =

Japanese Shinto priest who founded Shinto Shusei

- 新田邦光
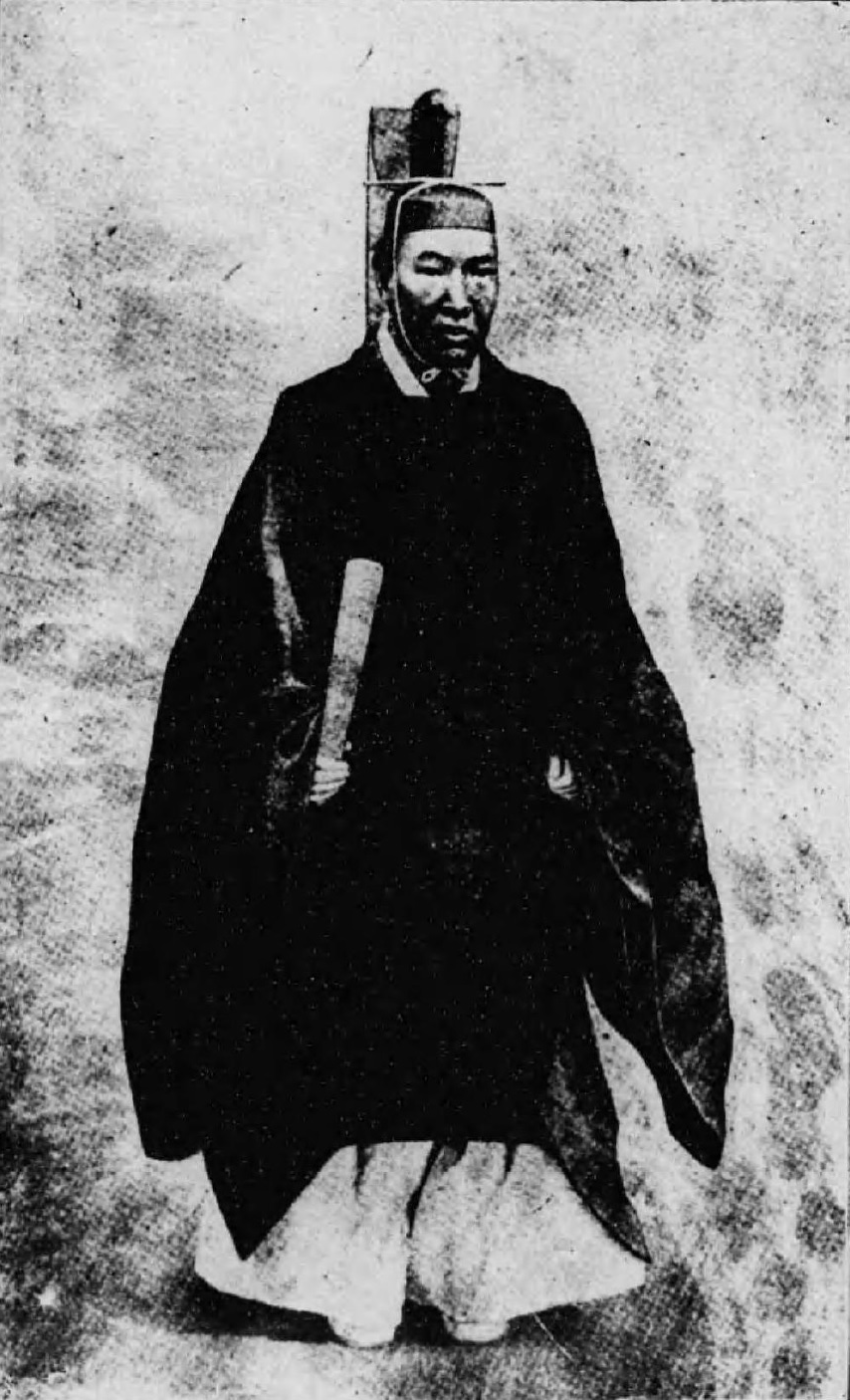

Personal life
- Born: 30 December 1829 Ebara Village (拝原村), Awa Province, Shikoku (present-day Mima, Tokushima)
- Died: 25 November 1902 (aged 72)
- Known for: Founding Shinto Shusei (神道修成派, Shintō shūsei-ha)

Religious life
- Religion: Shinto
- Sect: Shinto Shusei

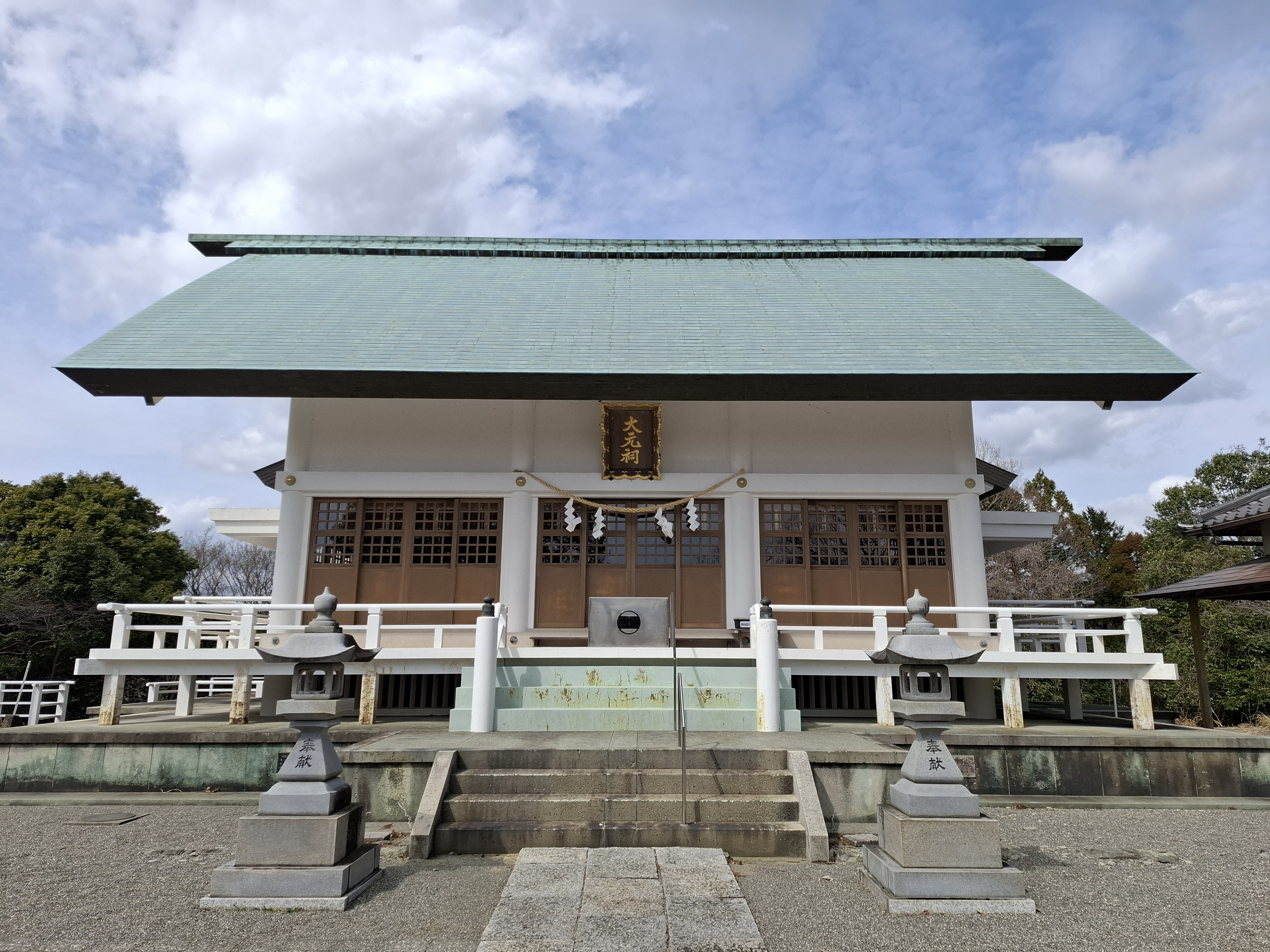
The worship hall of the upper shrine of Shintō Shūseiha Daigenshi (神道修成派大元祠) on the summit of Mount Shishigahana (獅子ケ鼻山) in Iwata, Shizuoka

Nitta Kuniteru (新田邦光) (1829–1902) was a founder of a Sect Shinto group. He founded Shinto Shusei (神道修成派, Shintō shūsei-ha) in 1849. He read the Analects at age 9. He founded the sect at age twenty, and considered Japanese people to be descendants of deities. He considered allegiance to the Emperor of Japan to be central to his philosophy; he was a supporter of Sonnō jōi but supported the Boshin Rebellion and the Meiji Restoration later. He managed to gain independence for the sect in 1876.

He believed that man's body came from his parents but his spirit came from the three kami Ame-no-Minakanushi, Takamimusubi, and Kamimusubi who he identified with Shangdi. His sect had very positive attitudes towards science and commerce.

== Biography ==
Nitta Kuniteru was born on December 30, 1829. His birthplace was Ebara-mura (拝原村) in Awa Province on the island of Shikoku (present-day Mima, Tokushima). He had several names. Sometimes he was called Takezawa Kansaburo. He also used the name Toyō.

He read the Analects at age 9 in 1838.

Kuniteru believed Japan was a sacred land. He thought the people were descendants of gods from an early age.

His early life was a time of change during the late Edo period. There was unrest in the country. Western ideas and Christian missions were influencing Japan. This worried many people. They wanted to protect Japanese culture.

Nitta Kuniteru thought deeply about these issues. He believed in Shinto, the traditional religion of Japan, but he combined it with Confucian philosophy. He traveled around Japan. He talked to people about his ideas. He wanted to unite the Japanese people. He was against foreign influences. He founded the sect at the age of 20 in 1849.

He was involved in politics. He supported the Emperor and Sonnō jōi the movement to restore the emperor. This was during the end of the Tokugawa regime. He believed religion was important for a strong country. He promoted his own version of Confucian Shinto. He went to places controlled by the Tokugawa. He told people to follow the Emperor. This led to his arrest. Later, he was released. He then lived in Edo, which is now Tokyo.

In 1868, Kuniteru joined the Department of Divinities. This was a government office for Shinto rituals. He got involved in a scandal. This led to his imprisonment in the Oshi domain.

In Edo, he continued preaching about nationalism. His ideas were popular and he gained a large following. On August 31, 1873, they formed the Shusei Association. This group became a new Shinto sect. He managed to gain independence for the sect in 1876. Kuniteru became the first leader of this sect in 1884.

Kuniteru's teachings are a distinct form of Confucian Shinto from the older Suika Shinto. This approach attracted more followers. He also welcomed members from other religious groups. These included the Ontake and mountain worship Shinto sects.

He died on November 25, 1902. Shinto Shusei still exists today and is headquartered in Iwata, Shizuoka.

== See also ==
- Nitta clan
- Nitta Shrine
- Edo neo-Confucianism
