= Sect Shinto =

Non-mainstream Shinto sects

Sect Shinto (教派神道, Kyōha Shintō; or 宗派神道, Shūha Shintō) refers to independently organized Shinto groups that were excluded from the Imperial Japanese government-sponsored State Shinto in 1882. In contrast to mainstream Shrine Shinto, which primarily emphasizes ritualistic practices, Sect Shinto often focuses on specific theological doctrines. Many of these sects are affiliated with the Association of Sectarian Shinto (教派神道連合会, Kyōha Shintō Rengōkai).

Prior to World War II, there were 13 officially recognized denominations of Sect Shinto. These were commonly referred to as the "thirteen Shinto sects". The number of non-Shrine Shinto sects has grown since then.

Its counterpart, Shrine Shinto, represents a collective tradition of various local shrines and customary beliefs throughout Japan. Those various shrines and beliefs were later unified under the authority of the Ise Grand Shrine during the Meiji period.

Sect Shinto is rooted in kokugaku (lit. 'national study'), a school of thought that emphasized Japanese classical literature and Shinto philosophy.

Although Tenrikyo has historically been classified as a form of Sect Shinto, it is commonly regarded as a distinct monotheistic religion.

== History ==
While Sect Shinto can be traced to the late Edo period, it became more firmly established during the Meiji era following the Meiji Restoration. Its development was influenced by the religious policies of the Meiji government, and occurred during a period of expanding theological discourse involving individuals from a broad range of social classes, rather than only intellectuals.

In 1868, the new Meiji government issued the Shinto-Buddhist Separation Order, resulting in haibutsu kishaku, a philosophy advocating the abandonment of Buddhism in Japan and the restoration of the unity of ritual and government systems. Following the Taikyo Proclamation, which designated Shinto as the state religion, the Great Teaching Institute was established. It was soon reformed into the Bureau of Shinto Affairs, and later as Shinto Taikyo.

During these early religious policies, the Meiji government promoted a nationalized system of Shinto education known as kyōdō shoku. However, as principles like the separation of church and state and freedom of religion grew in popularity, the kyōdō shoku ended. This led to a division in Shinto between shrines for state-run public rituals and religious groups centered on edification. Groups that met certain conditions (such as the number of followers) were officially recognized as "independent denominations". This was the beginning of the denominational Sect Shinto.

This separation strengthened the efforts to establish an institution that was a more developed version of the former Shodo Shido Practice Center. Accordingly, the Meiji government established the Office of Japanese Classics Research in Tokyo to organize the ideas unique to Japan. It was independent of the Bureau of Shinto Affairs and was later succeeded by Kokugakuin University.

== Establishment ==
=== Formation of a united government ===
The driving force for denominational Shintoism was the separation of Shinto and Buddhism, which began in 1868 (first year of Meiji), with the revival of the Department of Divinities. This started the Shinto-Buddhist Hanzen Order, a pre-modern imperial government directive. This directive led to the formation of the unity of ritual and government, and a Shinto government was revived. At that time, official decrees abolished the hereditary system of Shinto priests, ending the jurisdiction of the Shirakawa and Yoshida families over Shinto.

The rituals of the Shinto shrines are the religious services of the state, and it is, of course, true that they are not the private property of one person or one family. This is a common practice in the country, and priests are considered to be a separate species from the people. — Meiji 4th Year Taishogun's Bulletin No. 234

During this transition, the concept of missionaries to propagate Shinto remained. In 1870 (Meiji 3), the imperial Taikyo Proclamation designated Shinto as the state religion. The Great Teaching Institute was established in 1872 (Meiji 5) as a missionary organization but was dissolved in 1875 (Meiji 8). In the same year, it was succeeded by the Bureau of Shinto Affairs, to which the originally disparate folk-belief religions belonged.

=== Ministry of Religion, kyōdō shoku, and the Taikyo Institute ===
In 1872, the Missionary Office was abolished and replaced by the Ministry of Religion. In April, Shinto priests and monks were assigned kyōdō shoku positions. The Ministry was later dissolved in 1877, and kyōdō shoku was abolished in 1884.

The priesthood was initially divided into two geographic divisions. The eastern division was headed by Konoe Tadafusa (priest of Ise Grand Shrine) and the western division by Senge Takatomi, the grand priest of Izumo Taisha Shrine. This led to a struggle for power between the Ise and Izumo factions. On January 30, 1873, the geographic division was abolished, and the two regions were combined. However, they were once again divided later, becoming a three-part system with Senge Takatomi, Koga Takemichi, and Inaba Masakuni. Later, with the addition of Yoriyasu Tanaka, the grand priest of the Ise Grand Shrine, they became a four-part system. Simultaneously, Kurozumikyō and Shinto Shusei were specially established as denominational Shinto sects, and the compartment system was abolished.

In May 1873, the Ministry of Religion issued a religious ordinance, which set standards for the approval of kosha (religious lectures or meetings). In August, the Ministry approved the Kurozumikyō, the Toho Kami (later Misogi-Kyo), the Mitake, and the Fuji Isan (later Fuso-kyo), as well as Buddhist kosha.

In 1873, the Great Teaching Institute was established—first in Kojimachi and Kioicho and later in Masukami and Shiba at Zōjō-ji—as the head temple for kyōdō shoku of a joint Shinto and Buddhist sect. The Taikyo Institute was initiated by the Buddhist side to concretize teaching by the Ministry of Religion, but it later became focused entirely on Shinto. The Buddhist side, led by Shinshū, broke away from the institute. On April 30, 1875, the Taikyo Institute was dissolved by order of the Ministry of Religion.

=== Bureau of Shinto Affairs ===
In March 1875, the Bureau of Shinto Affairs was formed just before the dissolution of the Taikyo Institute. It was formed by a group of Shinto shrines at Ise Grand Shrine and other shrines throughout Japan, as well as by Shinto priests and instructors belonging to private Shinto-related kosha. The Shinto side felt that no organization corresponded to the various Buddhist sects, and on March 27, 1875 (Meiji 8), Grand High Priest Suechi Sanjonishi, Grand Priest-in-Charge Inaba Masakuni, Yoriyasu Tanaka, Hirayama Seisai, and Konosetsu Tsume jointly petitioned the Ministry of Religion for the establishment of a government office for Shinto.

The next day, on March 28, 1875, the Grand Priest Suechi Sanjonishi received permission to establish the Bureau of Shinto Affairs. On April 8, he requested that the Ministry of Religion put this into action. The content of the request was that even small shrines, centered on the Imperial Shrine at Ise, should be able to cooperate for the purpose of propagating Shinto. On April 15, the Bureau was opened in the Tokyo Branch Office of the Jingu Shinchosha. Once it was prepared, bringing together the traditionally existing shrines, Shinto kosha, and congregations following folk beliefs, various denominations were able to branch out and become independent from it.

The following year, in 1876 (Meiji 9), a dormitory was established in the Shinto Office to train priests. Additionally, the Kurozumikyō and Shinto Shusei, which had been flourishing, became independent denominations.

Inaba Masakuni was the first president of the Bureau of Shinto Affairs. Yoriyasu Tanaka was the Chief of Ise Jingu and the first head of Jingūkyō. Hirayama Seisai was the grand priest of Hikawa Shrine and the first headmaster of Shinto Taiseikyo and Ontake-kyo. Kousetsu Tsume would become the second head minister of the Ontake Sect.

In 1886, the Bureau was reorganized, later becoming the sect Shinto Taikyo.

==== Controversy over shrine deities ====
In 1880, the opinion of Senge Takatomi on the deities to be worshiped in the Bureau of Shinto Affairs' temples was controversial, leading to the division of Shinto into the Ise and Izumo factions. By order of the Meiji Emperor, a conference on Shinto was held in January 1881 (Meiji 14), attended by 118 people, including all the chief priests of government buildings and the instructors of sixth grade and above. The conference could not decide on the issue, and the Meiji Emperor made the final decision as to which deities would be worshipped there.

== Separation of ritual and faith ==
In January 1882, the separation of ritual and religion was enacted by the Ministry of Home Affairs through Bill No. 7 which prohibited those in the kyōdō shoku (priest-teacher position) from performing rituals, thereby promoting the separation of those who continued to be priests performing rituals or preaching the teachings and solidifying the formation of Sect Shinto as separate from State Shinto.

Priests shall no longer serve as teachers and shall not be involved in funeral services. — January 24, Meiji 15, the Ministry of Internal Affairs and Communications No. 7

After this, on May 15, 1882, the six factions (including Jingūkyō) became independent. Jingu Haruhayashiden (the source of the ritual god controversy) was transferred to Jingūkyō's ownership and renamed Daijingu Shrine, and Jingū Taima were distributed by Jingūkyō. Senge Takatomi took the opportunity to resign from his position as priest of Izumo Taisha Shrine and handed it over to his younger brother, who became the head of the Izumo Taisha Sect.

On August 11, 1884, the government issued a proclamation abolishing the kyōdō shoku position. In turn, this meant the Bureau of Shinto Affairs had lost its original reason for the opening, and so in 1886, the Bureau reorganized. It later became Shinto Taikyo, one of the schools of Shinto.

=== Office of Japanese Classics Research ===
On November 4, 1881, the Office of Japanese Classics Research was established as a successor to the Bureau of Shinto Affairs. Like its predecessor, it was a unified Shinto missionary organization established to train Shinto priests. Funded by an imperial gift, it purchased a mansion in Iidacho, Kojimachi-ku (present-day Chiyoda-ku).

Immediately after the Great Council of Shinto, it was decided to establish the Office upon the proposal of Akiyoshi Yamada, the Lord of Home Affairs. Prince Arisugawa Takahito was appointed as its first president and announced his intention to pursue a unique Japanese academic discipline. In the "Announcement of the Establishment of the Imperial Academy" (jointly signed by Li-Kuro Kubo, Yorikuni Inoue, Nakasaburo Itsumi, and Hans Shishino), the intention of the establishment of the academy was to train personnel to maintain kokutai (national identity). The Imperial Institute established branches in the provinces and qualified students for priesthood.

The Office was later succeeded by Kokugakuin University.

=== Academics ===
In December 1868 (the first year of Meiji), the Imperial Academy was established in Kyoto but was abolished the following year. When the Ministry of Religion was established in 1872, it was responsible for research.

In 1882 (Meiji 15), institutes of imperial studies were established one after another. This was due to a keen awareness of the need for doctrinal studies in the rites and rituals controversy. The controversy was divided between the doctrinalists (denominational Shinto sects) and the national scholars (academics). As the doctrinalists became independent, the national scholars were stimulated and the separation of doctrine and learning progressed. On April 30, Jingūkyō established Kōgakkan University in Ise. On May 30, the Department of Classics was established at the University of Tokyo.

== After World War II ==
On December 15, 1945, the Supreme Commander for the Allied Powers (GHQ) issued the Shinto Directive aimed at dismantling State Shinto. In January of the following year, the Dai Nihon Shinto-kai, the Imperial Academy, and the Jingu Bonan-kai were dissolved to form the Association of Shinto Shrines, a religious corporation. In March, Jingu-Shogakukan University was abolished by the Shinto directive; in April, representatives of each denomination explained their denomination to the GHQ Civilian Information and Education Department at Broadcasting Hall 108. In June, at a meeting at Tenrikyo's Honshiba Grand Church between the presidents of the various schools and W. K. Vance, head of the Religious Affairs Division at GHQ, the occupying forces promised not to impose any restrictions on the religious activities of the Shinto sects.

Tenrikyo established a policy of restoration immediately in 1945, and Konkokyo established the Council for the Establishment of the Faith in 1951 to eliminate Shinto colors.

The system in which there were 13 Shinto sects and 13 Buddhist sects recognized by the government was broken up into even smaller groups as religious organizations when the Religious Corporation Law was enacted.

=== Shinto research institutions ===
Many of the scholars who had played a central role in Shinto research and education were expelled and replaced by folklorists such as Shinobu Orikuchi and Kunio Yanagita, as well as younger Shinto scholars who escaped expulsion. On March 20, 1946, Kokugakuin University became a corporation, and the training of priests, which had been commissioned by the Ministry of Home Affairs, was continued from April as a new commission through the Jinja Main Office. The following year, Vance and Woodard of the Religious Affairs Division of GHQ decided that there was no problem with the study of Shinto and training of priests as a private university, and in 1948, the Shinto Affairs Department was established to form a Shinto training organization.

The Shinto Scholarship Association, which had been conducting Shinto courses, was also dissolved in 1946. In July 1949, at a meeting of the Federation of Shinto Sects at the Kinko Grand Church of the Tenrikyo Tokyo Branch Office, it was decided that Shinto lectures would be held at the Shinto Training Department of Kokugakuin University on behalf of the Federation of Shinto Sects; this practice continued until 1966. Holding the Shinto course promoted the university as a Shinto university that combined both Shrine Shinto and Sect Shinto. As of 1996, Kokugakuin University was said to be the only university with a course on Sect Shinto.

== Sects ==
=== Overview ===
There are five main groups of Sect Shinto:

1. Fukko Shinto (Revival Shinto) lineage – includes Shinto Taikyo, Shinrikyo, and Izumo-taishakyo (which originates from Izumo Taisha)
2. Confucian Shinto – Shinto Taiseikyo (神道大成教) and Shinto Shusei
3. Mountain worship lineage – includes Jikkō kyō, Fuso-kyo, and Ontake-kyo
4. Purification sects – Misogikyo and Shinshu-kyo
5. Utopian groups – Kurozumikyō, Tenrikyo, and Konkokyo

Tenrikyo is now classified by the Agency for Cultural Affairs as one of the various religions, not as a Shinto denomination.

=== History ===
The first independent denominations were Kurozumikyō and Shinto Shusei in 1876 (Meiji 9). Jingūkyō was founded in 1882 but later reorganized into the Ise Shrine Offering Association (Note: This was one of the predecessor organizations that formed the Association of Shinto Shrines after World War II.) in 1899 (Meiji 32).

In 1895, eight denominations—Izumo Taisha-kyo, Kurozumikyō, Ontake-kyo, Jikkō kyō, Shinto Taiseikyo, Shinshu-kyo, Fuso-kyo, and Jingūkyō—joined to form the Shintō Dōshikai (lit. 'Society of Shinto Colleagues'). In 1899 (Meiji 32), the group was joined by Shinto Headquarters (Shinto Taikyo), Shinrikyo, and Misogikyo, and the name was changed to Shintō Konwakai; the same year, Jingūkyō reorganized as Jingū Hōnsaikai and withdrew from the federation. In 1912 (Meiji 45), Konkokyo, Shinto Shusei, and Tenrikyo joined, forming 13 groups (14 if including the breakaway Jingūkyō), and the name was changed to Shintō Kyōha Rengōkai. In 1934, the current name Kyōha Shintō Rengōkai (教派神道連合会, Federation of Sectarian Shinto) was adopted.

After World War II, Oomoto joined the federation, but Tenrikyo and Shinto Taiseikyo withdrew. Tensha Tsuchimikado Shinto was re-established after the war but never joined the federation. Shinshu-kyo withdrew in 1959 but returned in 1994.

In 1995, on the occasion of the 100th anniversary of its formation, the "100th Anniversary of the Formation of the Federation of Shinto Churches" was held. In addition to Misogi-kyo, Shinto Taikyo, Jingūkyō, Konkokyo, Kurozumikyō, Fuso-kyo, Ontake-kyo, Shinrikyo, Oomoto, Shinshu-kyo, Shinto Shusei, Izumo Taisha-kyo, and twelve other denominations, the presidents of Tenrikyo and Shinto Taiseikyo also attended.

Today, the federation has 12 affiliated groups.

Sect Shinto member organizations and 2020 statistics (Note: Statistics source excluding Tenrikyo and Tensha Tsuchimikado Shinto)
| Denomination | Founder | Founding date | Independence date | Joined federation | Withdrew from federation | Followers | Priests | Shrines and churches |
|---|---|---|---|---|---|---|---|---|
| Kurozumikyō | Munetada Kurozumi | 1846 | October 1876 | 1895 | —N/a | 297,351 | 1,312 | 307 |
| Shinto Shusei | Nitta Kuniteru | 1849 | October 1876 | 1912 | —N/a | 8,084 | 213 | 52 |
| Jingūkyō (disestablished 1946) | Yoritsune Tanaka | 1882 | May 1882 | 1895 | 1899 | —N/a (Note: Depending on interpretation, up to 98 million followers due to its role in founding the Association of Shinto Shrines.) | —N/a | —N/a |
| Izumo-taishakyo | Senge Takatomi | 1882 | May 1882 | 1895 | —N/a | 1,266,058 | 8,212 | 161 |
| Fuso-kyo | Shishino Nakaba | | May 1882 | 1895 | —N/a | 31,150 | 425 | 135 |
| Jikkō kyō | Hanamori Shibata | | May 1882 | 1895 | —N/a | 10,910 | 250 | 87 |
| Shinto Taiseikyo | Hirayama Seisai | 1882 | May 1882 | 1895 | 1976 | 21,515 | 173 | 30 |
| Shinshu-kyo | Masatsugu Yoshimura | | May 1882 | 1895 | —N/a | 126,181 | 203 | 93 |
| Ontake-kyo | Osuke Tsuda | | September 1882 | 1895 | —N/a | 42,550 | 1,119 | 346 |
| Shinto Taikyo | Inaba Masakuni | 1872 (Note: As the Great Teaching Institute) | January 1886 | 1899 | —N/a | 21,375 | 470 | 163 |
| Shinrikyo | Tsunehiko Sano | 1880 | October 1894 | 1899 | —N/a | 67,248 | 938 | 139 |
| Misogikyo | Masakane Inoue | | October 1894 | 1899 | —N/a | 78,675 | 482 | 61 |
| Konkokyo | Konkō Daijin | November 15, 1859 | June 1900 | 1912 | —N/a | 397,461 | 3,521 | 1,484 |
| Tenrikyo | Nakayama Miki | 1838 | November 1908 | 1912 | 1970 | 2,000,000 (Note: 2002 data) | | |
| Tensha Tsuchimikado Shinto | Abe no Seimei | | 1953 | —N/a | —N/a | 50,000 | | |
| Oomoto | Nao Deguchi | 1892 | 1956 | 1956 | —N/a | 166,367 | 4,280 | 715 |
| Total (sensu stricto) | —N/a | —N/a | —N/a | —N/a | —N/a | 2,534,925 | 21,598 | 3,773 |
| Total (sensu lato) | —N/a | —N/a | —N/a | —N/a | —N/a | 4,584,925 | | |

=== Kurozumikyō ===
Kurozumikyō (黒住教) is a group highly linked to Amaterasu.

=== Shinto Shusei ===
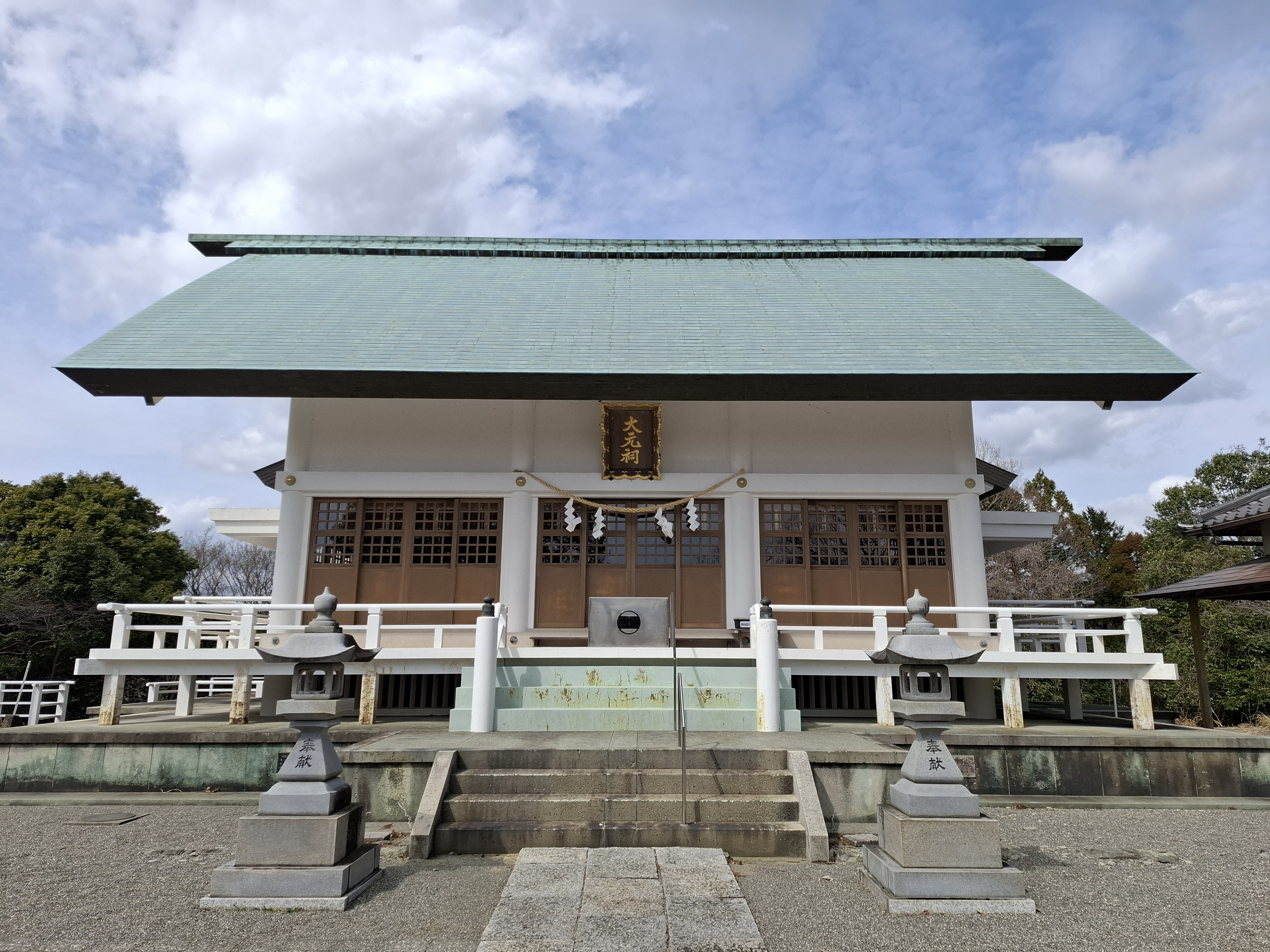
The worship hall of the upper shrine of Shintō Shūseiha Daigenshi (神道修成派大元祠) on the summit of Mount Shishigahana (獅子ケ鼻山) in Iwata, Shizuoka

Shinto Shusei (神道修成派) is considered a form of Confucian Shinto. It was founded in 1849 by Nitta Kuniteru (1829–1902), who was known to have read the Analects at age 9. He founded the sect at age 20, and considered Japanese people to be descendants of deities. He considered allegiance to the Emperor of Japan to be central to his philosophy; he was a supporter of Sonnō jōi ("revere the Emperor, expel the barbarians") but supported the Boshin Rebellion (the civil war between the shogunate and forces supporting the emperor) and the Meiji Restoration later.

Alongside Kurozumikyō, it was one of the first two Shinto sects to gain independence in 1876. It has not been very active in the postwar era.

=== Jingūkyō ===
Jingūkyō (神宮教) was a sect run out of Ise Grand Shrine that distributed Jingu Taima. It was a rival to Izumo-taishakyo and eventually left the federation and came to dominate State Shinto.

=== Izumo-taishakyo ===
Izumo-taishakyo (出雲大社教) was founded by Senge Takatomi. and has 1,266,058 followers. It is a Fukko Shinto lineage and at one point was a major rival with Jingūkyō.

=== Fuso-kyo ===
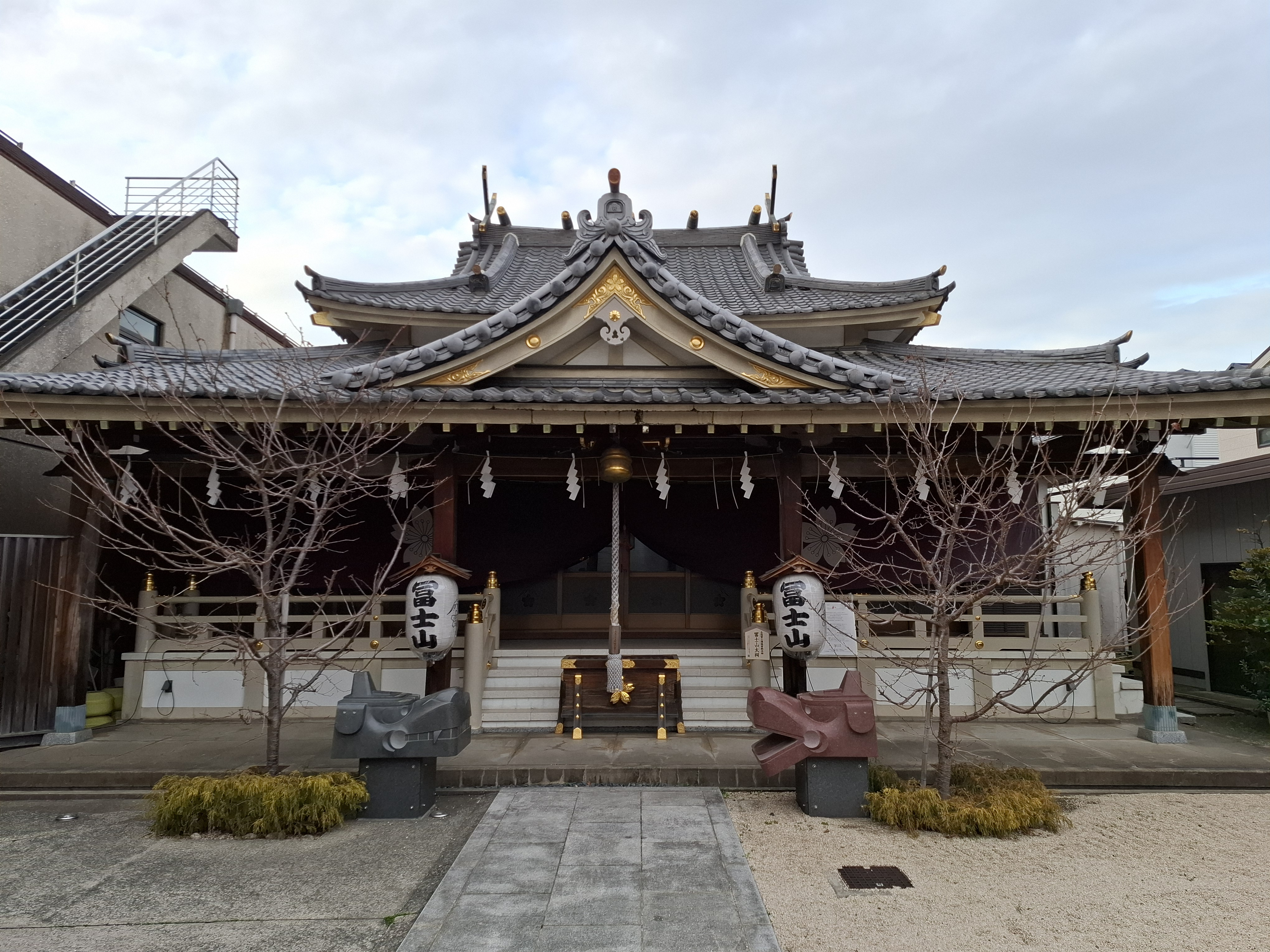
Fusō-kyō (扶桑教) headquarters shrine in Setagaya, Tokyo

Fusō-kyō (扶桑教) is a mountain worship sect traditionally seen to have been founded by Hasegawa Kakugyo (who was also associated with Jikkō kyō).

=== Jikkō kyō ===
Jikkō kyō (実行教) is a mountain worship sect traditionally seen to have been founded by Hasegawa Kakugyo (who was also associated with Fusō-kyō).

=== Shinto Taiseikyo ===
Shinto Taiseikyo (神道大成教) is a Confucian Shinto sect founded by Hirayama Seisai.

=== Shinshu-kyo ===
Shinshu-kyo (神習教) is a "purification sect" alongside Misogikyo.

It was founded by Masaki Yoshimura (1839–1915), who was a survivor of the Ansei Purge. He worked at Ise Jingu and later was head of Tatsuta Shrine, but due to laws restricting teaching, he entrusted his children to Itō Hirobumi (before he became Prime Minister) and established a new branch based on his family traditions.

=== Ontake-kyo ===
Ontake-kyo (御嶽教) is a mountain worship sect dedicated to Mount Ontake. It had 3 million members in 1930, which decreased to around 40,000 members in 2020.

=== Shinto Taikyo ===
Shintō Taikyō (神道大教) is the direct successor to the Taikyo Institute. Its name "Taikyo" refers to the Three Great Teachings first proclaimed in the Proclamation of the Great Doctrine.

=== Shinrikyo ===
Shinrikyo (神理教; lit. 'divine principle') is a Shinto sect considered to be part of the Fukko Shinto lineage of Sect Shinto, alongside Shinto Taikyo and Izumo-taishakyo. The name "Shinrikyo" is relatively common among Shinto groups, and uses different kanji characters than Aum Shinrikyo, a cult and terrorist organization.

It was founded by Tsunehiko Sano in 1880. Sano had previously studied medicine and was an advocate of traditional Japanese medicine. He studied kokugaku in his youth under Nishida Naokai.

Sano's thought blurred the lines between monotheism and polytheism, entering transtheism. His concept of kami was aimed at resisting the propagation of Christianity while composing teachings that were in line with the aims of popular national indoctrination. His core elements of the concept of kami did not change throughout his life.

He believed the etymology of kami was derived from vital force (Ikimochi). He saw this as emphasizing the interconnectedness of everything, from humans to nature, and as such this could be interpreted as a monotheistic view. He saw all the kami as unified under a divine principle, hence the name of the group.

=== Misogikyo ===
Misogikyo (禊教; lit. 'Misogi religion') is considered a "purification sect" alongside Shinshu-kyo.

The group is quite obscure today. It is very ritual-focused, with little theoretical theology. In this way, it contrasts with Yoshida Shinto. It emphasizes the right state of mind and self-control. It has influence from Confucian Shinto but is its own tradition.

=== Konkokyo ===
Konkōkyō (金光教, Konkō-kyō) is a faith that lies between traditional Shinto and its own unique practices such as toritsugi mediation, which emerged from Shinbutsu-shūgō.

=== Tenrikyo ===
Tenrikyo (天理教, Tenrikyō; sometimes rendered as 'Tenriism') was a Sect Shinto group founded by Nakayama Miki. After it was free to do so in 1946, Tenrikyo established itself as an independent religion outside of the Shinto designation.

=== Tensha Tsuchimikado Shinto ===
In the Edo period, the Tsuchimikado family, descendants of Abe no Seimei, established Tensha Tsuchimikado Shinto, influenced by Confucian Shinto through Suika Shinto. However, because of the inclusion of fortune-telling and magic, the Meiji government considered it pagan and issued the Tensha Shinto Prohibition Ordinance. After the war, it was restored as "Tensha Tsuchimikado Shinto Headquarters" and registered as a religious corporation rather than a Sect Shinto or a Shinto shrine.

=== Oomoto ===
Oomoto (大本, Ōmoto; lit. 'Great Source, or Great Origin') is a religion founded in the 1890s by Deguchi Nao (1836–1918) and Deguchi Onisaburō (1871–1948). Oomoto is typically categorized as a Shinto-based Japanese new religion.

=== New Sect Shinto ===
New Sect Shinto (shin kyoha Shinto) is a subset of Sect Shinto, and consists of numerous organizations. It is influenced by Buddhism and Confucianism.

It is part of the Sect Shinto movement not centering upon 13 sects. New Shinto sects have shamanistic leadership, syncretism of religious and philosophical beliefs, closely knit social organization, and individualism. Some groups have characteristics of monotheism, in the extreme case making a compromise of Buddhism, Confucianism, and folk religion.

One example of New Sect Shinto is Yamakage Shinto.

== See also ==
- Ko-Shintō
- Shinbutsu-shūgō
- Haibutsu kishaku

== Sources ==
- Inoue, Junko (April 1991). 教派神道の形成 [The Formation of Sect Shinto] (in Japanese). Kobundo [弘文堂]. ISBN 978-4335160219.
- 菅田, 正昭 (1985). 古神道は甦る. たま出版. ISBN 4884811321.（文庫：1994年.ISBN 4886924603.）「教派神道に流れる古神道の本質」の章あり.
- 村上, 重良 (April 1974). 慰霊と招魂-靖国の思想. 岩波新書. 岩波書店. ISBN 978-4004121565.
- 村上, 重良 (August 2007). 天皇制国家と宗教. 講談社学術文庫. 講談社. ISBN 978-4061598324.
- 小滝透『神々の目覚め-近代日本の宗教革命』春秋社, 1997年7月.ISBN 978-4393291245.
- 田中義能『神道十三派の研究 (上・下)』 第一書房, 1987年. 昭和初期に刊行された同書の復刻版.
- 沼田健哉 (1995), 宗教と科学のネオパラダイム, 創元社, ISBN 978-4422140193
- 文化庁編さん (March 2016). 宗教年鑑 [Religion Yearbook] (PDF) (in Japanese) (2015 ed.).
- 井上順孝ほか編 (January 1996). 新宗教教団・人物事典. 弘文堂. ISBN 978-4335160288.
- 阪本, 是丸 (September 1991). 書評と紹介『教派神道の形成』. 宗教研究. 65 (2): 161–164.
- 阪本, 是丸 (March 2009). "皇典講究所関係出版物に関する一考察". In 國學院大學研究開発推進センター (ed.). 史料から見た神道-國學院大學の学術資産を中心に. 弘文堂. pp. 107–135. ISBN 978-4335160561.
- 中山, 郁 (March 2009). "國學院大學と教派神道". In 國學院大學研究開発推進センター (ed.). 史料から見た神道-國學院大學の学術資産を中心に. 弘文堂. pp. 227–247. ISBN 978-4335160561.
- 西野神社 (17 October 2006). 西野神社 社務日誌：神社本庁以外の神社神道の包括団体.
