= Shintō Taiseikyō =

Shinto sect

Shinto Taiseikyo (神道大成教) is one of the thirteen Shinto sects. It was founded by Hirayama Seisai (1815–1890) and is considered a form of Confucian Shinto.

== History ==
Hirayama Seisai was involved in diplomatic negotiations as a senior vassal of the Shogunate at the end of the Edo period. At the beginning of the Meiji Restoration, he turned to Shinto. He became a Shinto teacher in 1872, and rallied for independence as a Shinto Sect in 1879, which was gained in 1882. During his tenure as president, Mitake-kyo also gained independence.

After World War II, it became independent from the Sect Shinto federation alongside Tenrikyo. Still, in 1995, the president attended a Sect Shinto event the "100th Anniversary of the Formation of the Federation of Shinto Churches".

== Shrines ==
Shrines of Shinto Taiseikyo include

- Tenshozan Shrine – Yugawara Town, Ashigarashimo District, Kanagawa Prefecture
- Tenshozan Shrine branch shrine
- Hirayama Seisai Tomb – located in Yanaka Cemetery
