= Edo neo-Confucianism =

Neo-Confucian philosophy that developed in Japan during the Edo period

Edo Neo-Confucianism, known in Japanese as Shushi-Gaku (朱子學, shushigaku), literally 'school of Zhu Xi', refers to the schools of Neo-Confucian philosophy that developed in Japan during the Edo period. Neo-Confucianism reached Japan during the Kamakura period. The philosophy can be characterized as humanistic and rationalistic, with the belief that the universe could be understood through human reason, and that it was up to man to create a harmonious relationship between the universe and the individual. The 17th-century Tokugawa shogunate adopted Neo-Confucianism as its principle and Confucian philosophy took hold. Neo-Confucians such as Hayashi Razan and Arai Hakuseki were instrumental in the formulation of Japan's dominant early modern political philosophy.

== History ==
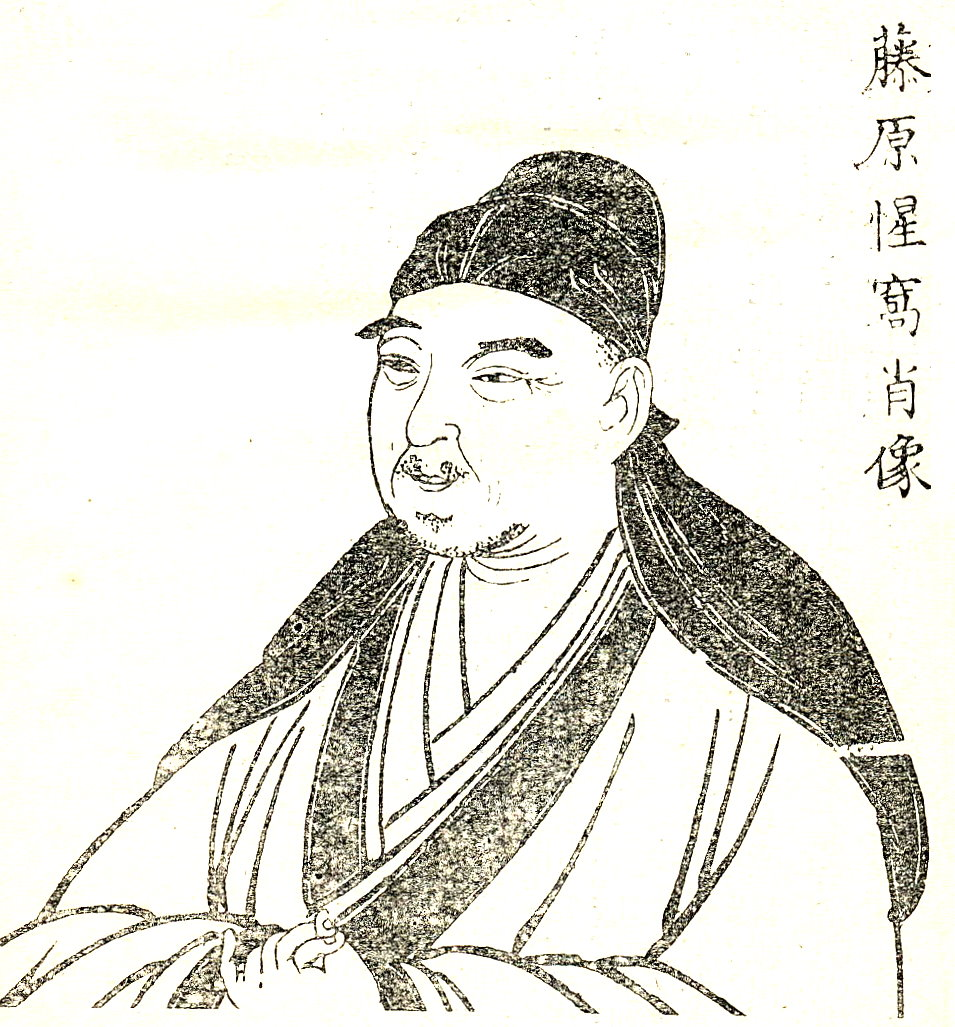
Fujiwara Seika from Japanese book 先哲像伝. Fujiwara was one of the major pioneers of Neo-Confucianism in Japan.

Neo-Confucianism has its origins in the Chinese Tang dynasty; the Confucianist scholars Han Yu and Li Ao are seen as forebears of the Neo-Confucianists of the Song dynasty. The Song dynasty philosopher Zhou Dunyi is seen as the first true "pioneer" of Neo-Confucianism, using Daoist metaphysics as a framework for his ethical philosophy. Neo-Confucianism developed both as a renaissance of traditional Confucian ideas, and as a reaction to the ideas of Buddhism and religious Daoism. Although the Neo-Confucianists denounced Buddhist metaphysics, Neo-Confucianism did borrow Daoist and Buddhist terminology and concepts.

Neo-Confucianism was brought to Japan during the late Kamakura period. It was spread as basic education for monks in training and others of the Five Mountain System (Gozan) network of Zen temples while its theory was completed by annotations brought by the monk Yishan Yining, who visited Japan in 1299 from the Yuan dynasty, in the form of the Cheng-Zhu school of Neo-Confucianism. Moreover, Neo-Confucianist thought derived from the works of Cheng Yi, Cheng Hao, and Zhu Xi, and the then-orthodox ideology of China and Korea. The rise of Neo-Confucianism in Japan was aided by state support from the Tokugawa government, who encouraged the establishment of national secular ideology as a method of strengthening political rule over the country. The philosophy had arrived earlier in the 14th century, but knowledge of it was limited to Zen monasteries, who saw Confucianism as intellectually interesting, but secondary to Zen, and some schools like the Ashikaga Gakko.

Three main traditions of Neo-Confucian studies developed in Japan. The Shushigaku, based on the Chinese school of the philosopher Zhu Xi, became the cornerstone of education, teaching as cardinal virtues filial piety, loyalty, obedience, and a sense of indebtedness. The Ōyōmeigaku centred upon the teachings of the Chinese philosopher Wang Yangming, who held self-knowledge to be the highest form of learning and placed great emphasis on intuitive perception of truth. The Kogaku school attempted to revive the original thought of the Chinese sages Confucius and Mencius, which it felt had been distorted by the other Japanese Neo-Confucian schools.

Neo-Confucianism is considered as the controlling ideology of the Tokugawa period (1603–1867), which has frequently been interpreted within the framework of modernization theories which regard the growth of Neo-Confucianism during this time as a movement towards rational, secular thought in contrast to the predominantly spiritual and religious concerns of medieval Buddhism.

The pioneering Japanese Neo-Confucian was Fujiwara Seika, a former Zen practitioner interested in Confucian thought, who eventually rejected Zen ideas to become one of Neo-Confucianism's foremost advocates in Japan. Fujiwara's student, Hayashi Razan, served the Tokugawa shōguns, and through state patronage was able to establish the Shoheiko academy. After the Kansei Edict established Neo-Confucianism as Japan's official ideology, the Shoheiko academy became the premier authority on Confucian orthodoxy. Although heterodox schools of Neo-Confucianism were officially banned, the schools still persisted in Japan. The Japanese philosopher Toju Nakae is one such case, who was more influenced by the heterodox Wang Yangming than he was by the orthodox Zhu Xi.

The influence of Neo-Confucianism was challenged by the rise of the Kokugaku philosophical school in the 17th and 18th centuries. Kokugaku advocates argued that the ancient Japanese were better representatives of Confucian virtues than the ancient Chinese were, and that there should be more intellectual focus on ancient Japanese classics and the indigenous religion of Shinto. Although philosophical competitors, Kokugaku and Neo-Confucianism would co-exist as the dominant philosophical thought of Japan until the arrival of Western philosophy during the Meiji period.

== Philosophy ==
Like Chinese and Korean Confucianism, Edo Neo-Confucianism is a social and ethical philosophy based on metaphysical ideas. The philosophy can be characterized as humanistic and rationalistic, with the belief that the universe could be understood through human reason, and that it was up to man to create a harmonious relationship between the universe and the individual.

A leading direction in Edo Neo-Confucianism is the school of "principle" (Japanese: ri). It is related with the discovery and practice of principles and laws, and is predominantly represented by Zhu Xi. Another leading direction is the school of "intuition" (Japanese: shin). It is associated with immediate intuition and action, springing from the spontaneous knowledge of right and wrong, which is obtained by means of self-cultivation and led by innate intuitive insight. It is principally embodied by Wang Yangming and his followers.

The rationalism of Neo-Confucianism is in contrast to the mysticism of the previously dominant Zen Buddhism in Japan. Unlike the Buddhists, the Neo-Confucians believed that reality existed, and could be understood by mankind, even if the interpretations of reality were slightly different depending on the school of Neo-Confucianism.

But the spirit of Neo-Confucian rationalism is diametrically opposed to that of Buddhist mysticism. Whereas Buddhism insisted on the unreality of things, Neo-Confucianism stressed their reality. Buddhism and Taoism asserted that existence came out of, and returned to, non-existence; Neo-Confucianism regarded reality as a gradual realization of the Great Ultimate... Buddhists, and to some degree, Taoists as well, relied on meditation and insight to achieve supreme reason; the Neo-Confucianists chose to follow Reason.

The social aspects of the philosophy are hierarchical with a focus on filial piety. This created a Confucian social stratification in Edo society that previously had not existed, dividing Japanese society into four main classes: the samurai, seen as the Japanese equivalent of the Chinese scholar-bureaucrats, at the top of the social hierarchy, then the farmers, artisans, and merchants. The samurai were especially avid readers and teachers of Confucian thought in Japan, establishing many Confucian academies.

Neo-Confucianism also introduced elements of ethnocentrism into Japan. As the Chinese Neo-Confucians had regarded their own culture as the center of the world, the Japanese Neo-Confucians developed a similar national pride. This national pride would later evolve into the philosophical school of Kokugaku, which would later challenge Neo-Confucianism, and its perceived foreign Chinese origins, as the dominant philosophy of Japan.

== Influences ==
Neo-Confucianism in the Tokugawa period contributed to the development of the bushido (code of warriors). The emphasis of Neo-Confucianism on the study of Chinese classics furthered a sense of history among the Japanese and led in turn to a renewed interest in the Japanese classics and a revival of Shintō studies. Most importantly, Neo-Confucianism encouraged scholars to concern themselves with the practical side of human affairs, with law, economics, and politics.

Many Japanese historical figures have addressed the importance and influences of the Edo Neo-Confucianism. Mishima Yukio, for example, wrote the treatise, "Wang Yang-ming doctrine as a revolutionary philosophy". Japanese reformers have also commented on the influences of Edo Neo-Confucianism in Japan at several times. Uchimura Kanzo wrote in Representative Men of Japan, that under the impact of Wang Yangming philosophy, the Japanese people were not afraid, timid, conservative, or reactionary when confronted with the modern challenges, but ready to fight and achieve modernization. Edo Neo-Confucianism was a prototype for action and a source of psychological, emotional, and intellectual confidence and strength for many before and after the Meiji Restoration, and continues to inspire the Japanese people.

Some scholars also believed that Edo Neo-Confucianism kept the Japanese elite from converting to Christianity. Yet others argue ideas of Edo Neo-Confucianism helped Japanese people to convert to Christianity. Members of the Kumamoto band turned Protestant against the wishes of their families and justified their decision by referring to Wang Yangming's doctrine of intuitive.

== Neo-Confucianists ==
- Fujiwara Seika (1561–1619)
- Hayashi Razan (1583–1657)
- Nakai Tōju (1608–1648)
- Yamazaki Ansai (1619–1682)
- Kumazawa Banzan (1619–1691)
- Kinoshita Jun'an (1621–1698)
- Yamaga Sokō (1622–1685)
- Itō Jinsai (1627–1705)
- Kaibara Ekken (a.k.a. Ekiken) (1630–1714)
- Satō Naokata (1650?–1719)
- Asami Keisai (1652–1712)
- Arai Hakuseki (1657–1725)
- Muro Kyūsō (1658–1734)
- Miyake Sekian (1665–1730)
- Ogyū Sorai (1666–1728)
- Amenomori Hōshū (1668–1755)
- Itō Tōgai (1670–1736)
- Matsumiya Kanzan (1686–1780)
- Goi Ranshū (1697–1762)
- Nakai Chikuzan (1730–1804)
- Hosoi Heishu (1728–1801)
- Ōshio Heihachirō (1793–1837)
- Yamada Hōkoku (1805–1877)
- Nitta Kuniteru (1829–1902)

== See also ==
- Confucian Shinto
- Kokugaku
- Kyōhō Reforms
- Yangmingism
