= Fukko Shinto =

Shinto movement

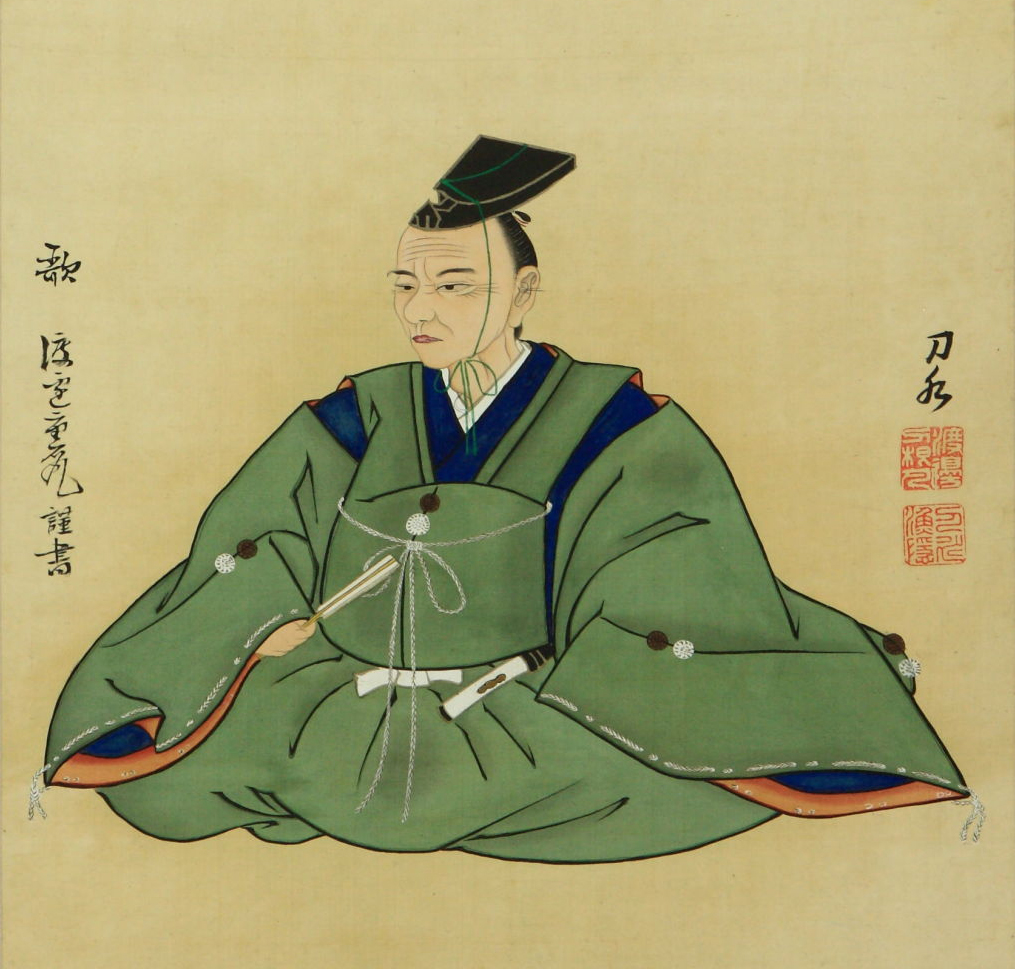
Hirata Atsutane

Fukko Shintō (復古神道, Restoration Shinto) is a movement within Shinto that was advocated by Japanese scholars during the Edo period. It attempted to reject Buddhist and Confucian influence on Shinto and return to a native Japanese tradition based on Koshinto.

There were many different variants of Fukko Shintō, but what generally united them was a desire to return to a worldview unique to the Japanese people, and which predated the influence of foreign teachings such as Confucianism and Buddhism. It placed great emphasis on "kannagara no michi" (roughly, "the way of the divine handed down from time immemorial"), which embodies the will of the gods.

Like Suika Shintō, which emerged in the early Edo period, Fukko Shintō came to exert great influence over its time. However, thanks to so-called Kokugakusha (scholars of Japanese culture), it developed from a more academic standpoint. Scholars such as Kamo no Mabuchi and Motoori Norinaga first advanced the theory of Kodō, followed by Hirata Atsutane and Honda Chikaatsu who completed Fukko Shintō through rejection of Confucianism and Buddhism, and fervor for what they saw as Japan's pure and ancient beliefs. The movement became popular not only among merchants in the cities, but spread throughout the country through village leaders and landowners to peasants. It had great influence on the imperial loyalists at the end of the Edo period, and after the Meiji Restoration it was introduced as part of the Sonnō jōi (revere the emperor, expel the barbarians) movement's ideology.

In many schools of Fukko Shintō, "kotodama", and "kazutama" were used to interpret texts such as Kojiki and Nihon Shoki. Several have been adopted and reconstructed, such as togoto no kajiri, or mikusa no harai. Misogi was also considered important. Along with kotodama, futomani, tamashizume and kishinhō are considered the four pillars of Fukko Shintō. Alongside this, orifu was also developed. Many of the practices used in shintō shrines today have their origins in the Fukko Shintō movement. Currently, some religious groups claim to follow Fukko Shinto but not Hirata Atsutane, but this claim is seen as untenable.

== History ==
After Buddhism was introduced to Japan in the 5th century AD, it existed at various times both in coexistence and confrontation with Shinto, but with the Taika Reforms a peaceful relationship was established between the two. As the Buddhist sects Tendai and Shingon developed at the end of the Heian period, they were no longer merely coexisting, but a syncretistic blending of the religions began to take shape. Shinto, which also came to be known as "Kodō" (the old way), is one of the few religions that has continued to retain its animistic character, and unlike Buddhism and Christianity sanctions Sacred scripture with rules and doctrine. Shinto theology was therefore very difficult to formulate. As a result, Buddhist theory was used to explain the deities of Shinto.

During the Edo period, Kamo no Mabuchi drew attention to the existence of ancient Shinto in his book "Kokuikō", and Motoori Norinaga, taking note of this, then completed his major work "Kojikiden", a commentary on Kojiki. In "Naobi no Mitama", contained in its first volume, Norinaga explains the "way of the gods", which he believes to have been found in the ancient scriptures. This was to be of great importance to the founding of Fukko Shintō, which aimed to revive traditional Japanese Shinto.

Norinaga died before completing the work: at his death only the first seventeen of its forty-eight fascicles had been published, and his disciples continued the task until the entire commentary was finally completed twenty-one years later. The published edition included, appended to the seventeenth fascicle, Hattori Nakatsune's Sandaikō ("On the Three Realms"), a cosmological treatise on the formation of heaven, earth, and Yomi that sparked wide debate among kokugaku scholars and would go on to influence Hirata Atsutane's own Tama no mihashira.

Hirata Atsutane also played a major role in shaping the movement. He was inspired by Motoori Norinaga's book, and came to clarify Japan's ancient history, as well as demonstrate the legitimacy of the kōdō (imperial way) to the world. Hirata also carried out prominent research on subjects related to the spirit world, such as the realm of the dead and the soul, and put forward his own version of kokugaku, which referred to other religious groups such as the hokke sect, Vajrayana, Christianity and Daoism. His ideas would become crucial for many proponents of Ko-Shintō such as Honda Chikaatsu and Kawatsura Bonji.

In the Meiji period, a number of Hirata's followers entered the government, where they encouraged the separation of Buddhism and Shinto, and the introduction of Shinto as the state religion. During the same period, Honda Chikaatsu, his disciple Nagasawa Katsutate, and Onisaburo Deguchi systematized the ancient Shinto doctrine of Ichirei Shikon (one soul four spirits), according to which the human soul is a so-called naohi (a division of an origin god), which controls four spirits: Ara-Mitama, Nigi-Mitama, Kushi-mitama, and Saki-Mitama.

== See also ==
- Buddhism
- Kokugaku
- Ko-Shintō
- Shinrikyo
- Shinto
