= Fujiko (religion) =

Japanese religious group

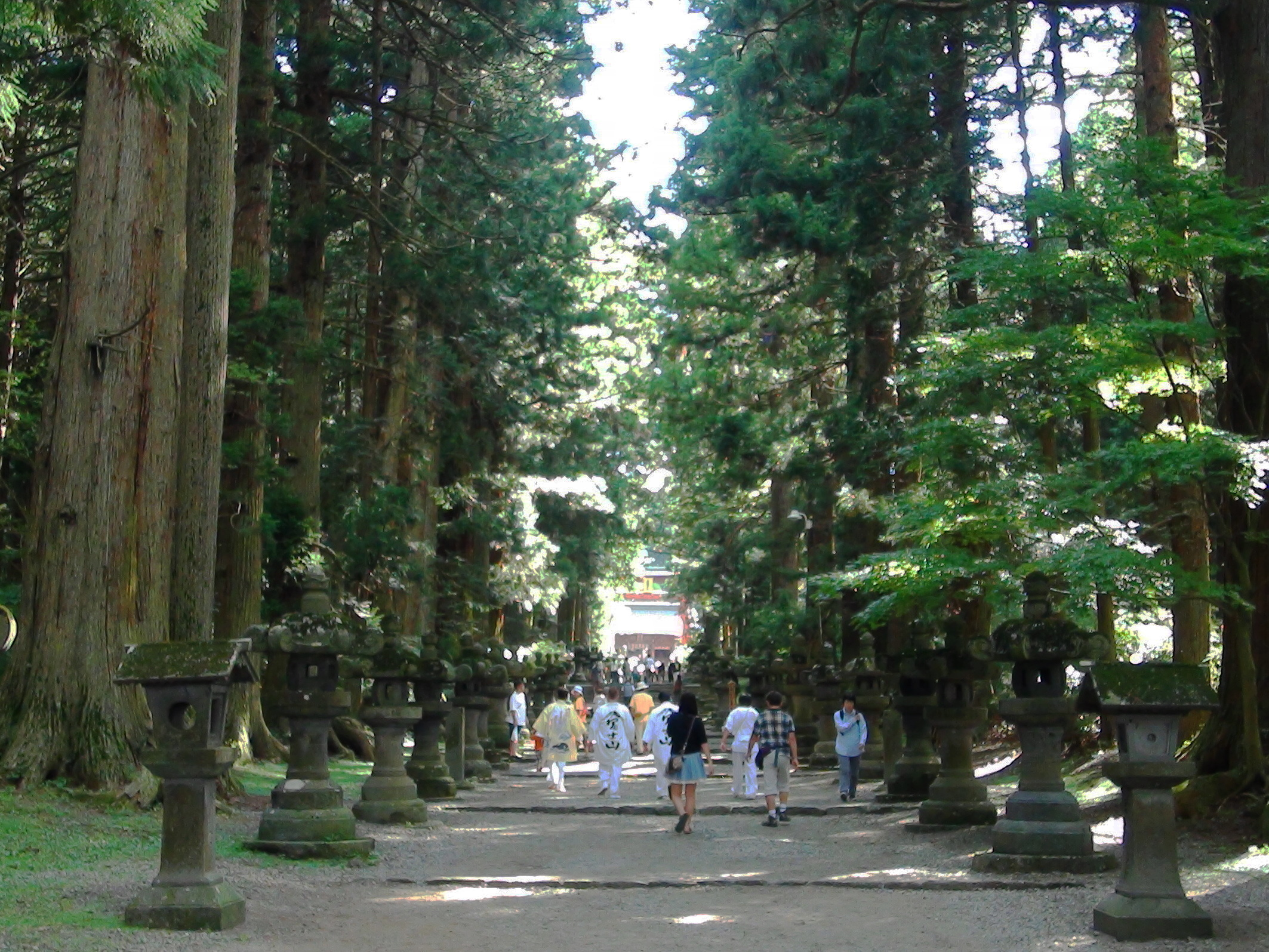
Fuji-ko members on the approach to Kitaguchi Hongu Fuji Sengen Shrine.

Fujiko (富士講) is a Japanese religious group. One of the popular beliefs established in the Edo period, especially in the eastern Kanto region centered on Edo, with a lineage of Kakugyo. The term "Fujikō" is usually used to refer to the religious system and religious movement in general. The term is also sometimes used to refer to Mount Fuji and its divine spirits.

The activities of the Fuji-kō consist of regular events called "ogami" and climbing Fuji. At the Ogami, they read the "Otsutae (Report)," a sutra of devotional service, and perform the "Otakiaage (burning up)" using an assembled altar called the "Ogami Dance (Worship Chest).

There are also examples of Fuji Mounds (sometimes natural mountains are used instead) built with stones and earth to worship the god of Mt. Fuji as a place of worship (see the article on Fuji Mound for details).

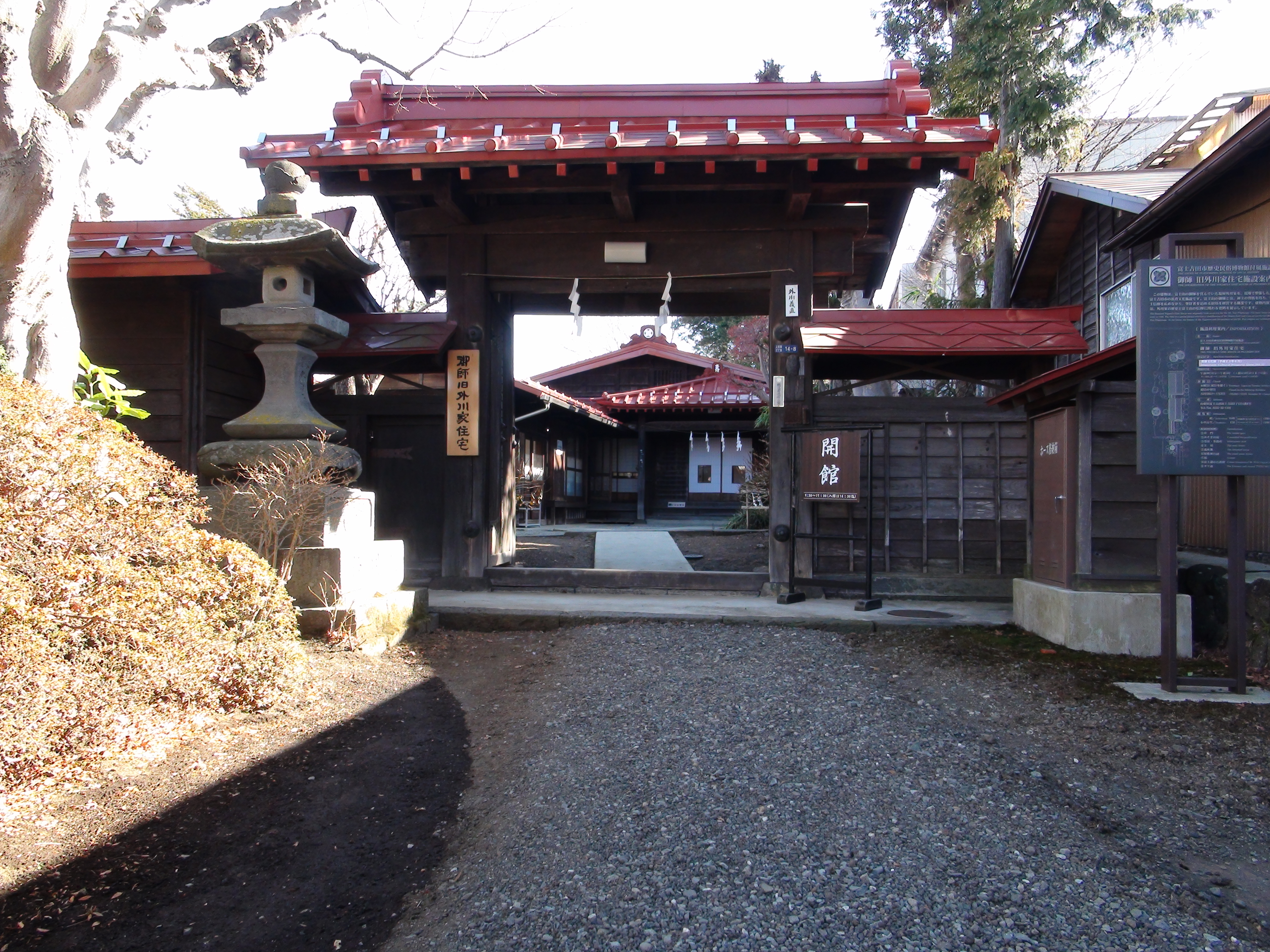
This is a typical building of the house of the Oshi of the Fujikou sect.

Oshi was the leader of the faith taught by Kakugyo, and at the same time, he was responsible for providing accommodations for the members of the Fuji-kō when they climbed Fuji. During the closing period of the mountain, Goshi would visit Fuji-kō in Edo and other areas to preach the teachings. In the summer, when Mt. Fuji was about to open, Fuji-kō members came one after another to Goshi's homes in Kawaguchi and Yoshida, and he provided them with lodgings, information about the mountain trail, food and equipment necessary for climbing, and various other services.

In the Edo period (1603–1868), "Fuji-kō" in the narrow sense referred only to the activities of masters in Yoshida, and the activities of masters in Kawaguchi, Sushiri, Suyama, and other areas outside Yoshida, as well as the relationship between masters and leaders, were not included in "Fuji-kō," and there is a suggestion that this was the more common form.。

In addition to the above, Fuji-kō (Asama-kō) is also a name for a group of people who believe in Fuji, derived from Shugendo. It is distributed in the Chubu region and Kinki region, but the actual situation differs greatly from the above, and is characterized by water practices (Fuji sakurei) held near water in early summer. They also climb Mt. Fuji, but they alternate climbing Ominesan every other year, a behavior not seen in the Kanto region.

== History ==
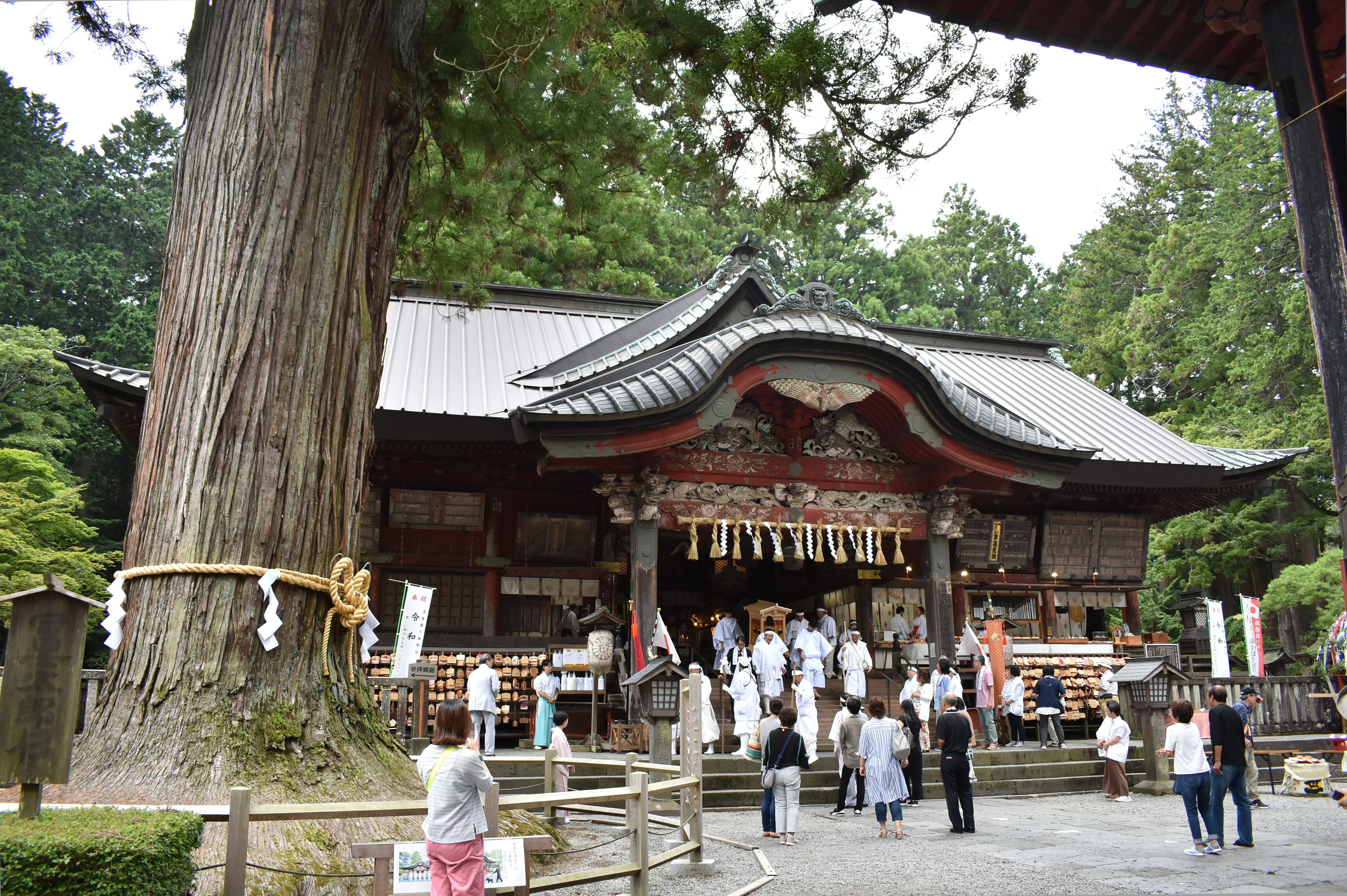
Kitaguchi Hongu Fushi Asama Shrine

Fuji-kō in the narrow sense originates from a sect of Kakugyo Fujibutsu, who practiced asceticism in Fuji Shrine. Later, Wantoshin (Akaba Shosaemon) and others formed the first kosha, which had the following three rules.

1. If you do good, you are good; if you do bad, you are bad.
2. If you earn, you will be blessed and noble, and your life will be long without disease.
3. If you are idle, you will be poor, have sickness, and your life will be short.

After the Kyōhō period, it was developed by Murakami Mitsukiyo and Shokugyo Miroku. Murakami was supported mainly by the feudal lords and the upper class, while Shokugyo, who preached that diligently working at the family business would save one's life, was enthusiastically supported by the common people of Edo.

He was the fifth (or sixth, depending on your point of view) disciple of Kakugyo, and after his death Kakugyo's beliefs did not belong to any existing religious force, so the group that was formed after Shokugyo Miroku's death was an independent religious force.

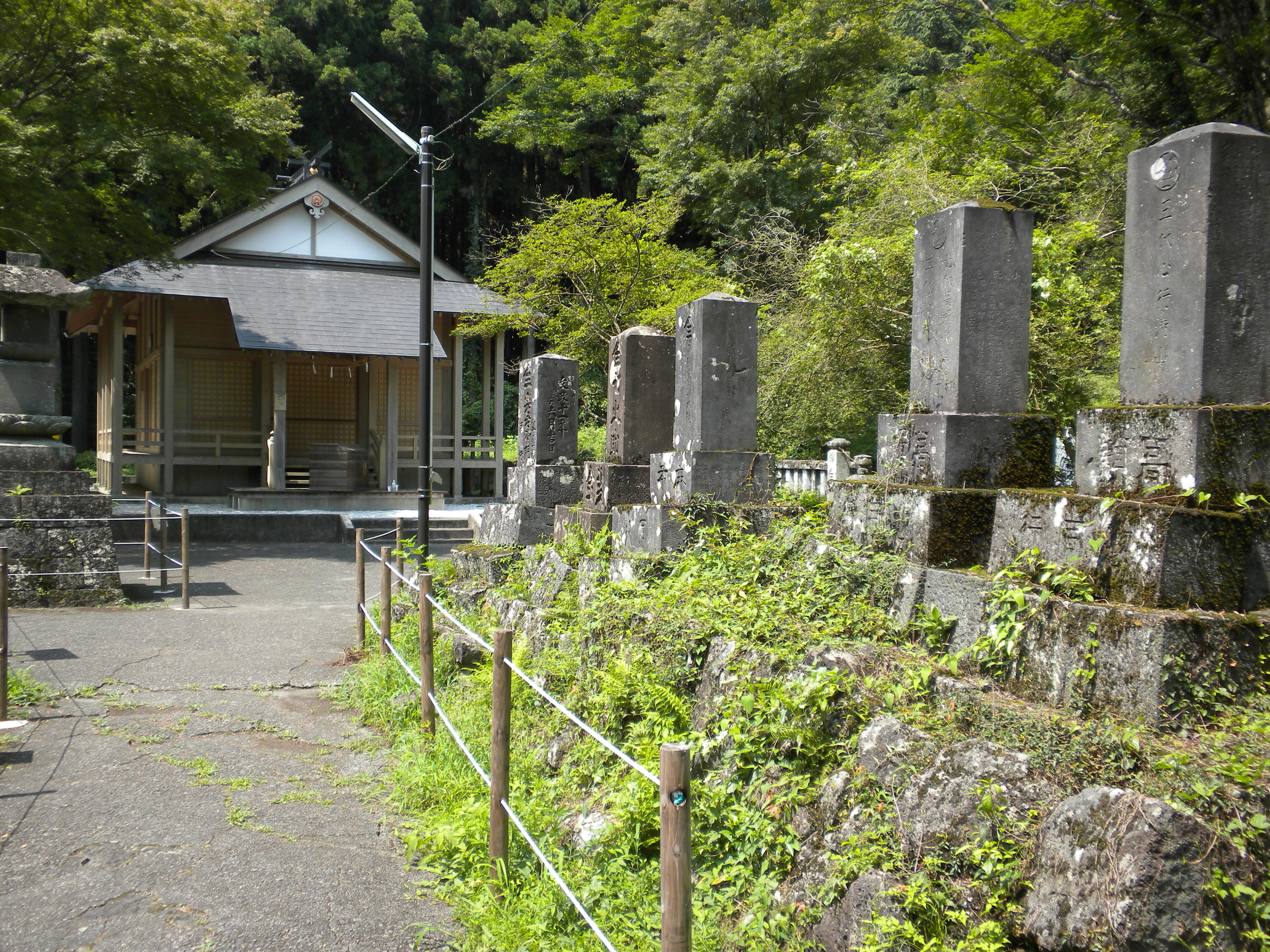
A group of monuments commemorating the Fuji-kō at the Higashiguchi Hongu Fuji Sengen Shrine (located in Oyama-cho, Suzū, Shizuoka Prefecture). The monuments were originally erected at the Fuji Mound in Azabu, Edo to commemorate the climb of Fuji.

On Fuji, Goshi communities were established at each trailhead and conducted missionary activities in the Kanto region and elsewhere, attracting many worshippers to Mt. Fuji. In particular, the Omiya and Suyama mouths, which took a long time to restore after the great eruption of Hōei, were crowded with worshippers from Edo and the Kanto region. At the height of the eruption, there were nearly a hundred houses of priests in Yoshida-guchi. In the late Edo period (1603–1868), there were so many societies that it was said that there were 800 societies in Edo and 80,000 members in the societies.

Fuji-kō was often forbidden by the Edo shogunate as it was considered undesirable due to its religious policy, but it was not suppressed so severely that it caused deaths.

However, after the Meiji era, suppression from Shinto forces became very severe. As a result, there was no choice. Some of the Fuji-kō were turned into denominational Shintoism, such as Kyōkyō by Fujimichi, who was a follower of Shokugyo, Maruyama-kō by Rokurobei Ito, who was an ascetic, and Fuso-kō by Hanshi Shishino, a follower of Hirata, who wanted to mobilize the various forces of the Fuji faith into State Shintoism.

After the Meiji era, and especially after Post-war, Mt. Fuji and the surrounding area became a tourist attraction, and climbing Mt. Fuji itself became recognized as a leisure activity, allowing people to climb Mt. Fuji casually, and the Fuji-kō, which sought faith as a motivation for climbing, declined greatly. For example, the construction of the monument tower at the Hitoana Fuji-kou Ruins has not been done since 1964.

The number of Fuji-ko members has decreased drastically, and it is rare to see Fuji-ko members active on the streets of Tokyo. However, you can still see Fuji-ko members making pilgrimages to Mount Fuji.

As of 2006 (Heisei 18), there are more than a dozen groups active, and three Goshi's houses (shukubo) accept them.

== Climbing Mt. Fuji ==
Fuji is the holy place for the Fuji-kō, and they repeatedly climb Mt. Fuji as a form of pilgrimage. The number of days and manner of climb vary depending on the sect, but a certain period of time is required to purify oneself before climbing the mountain.

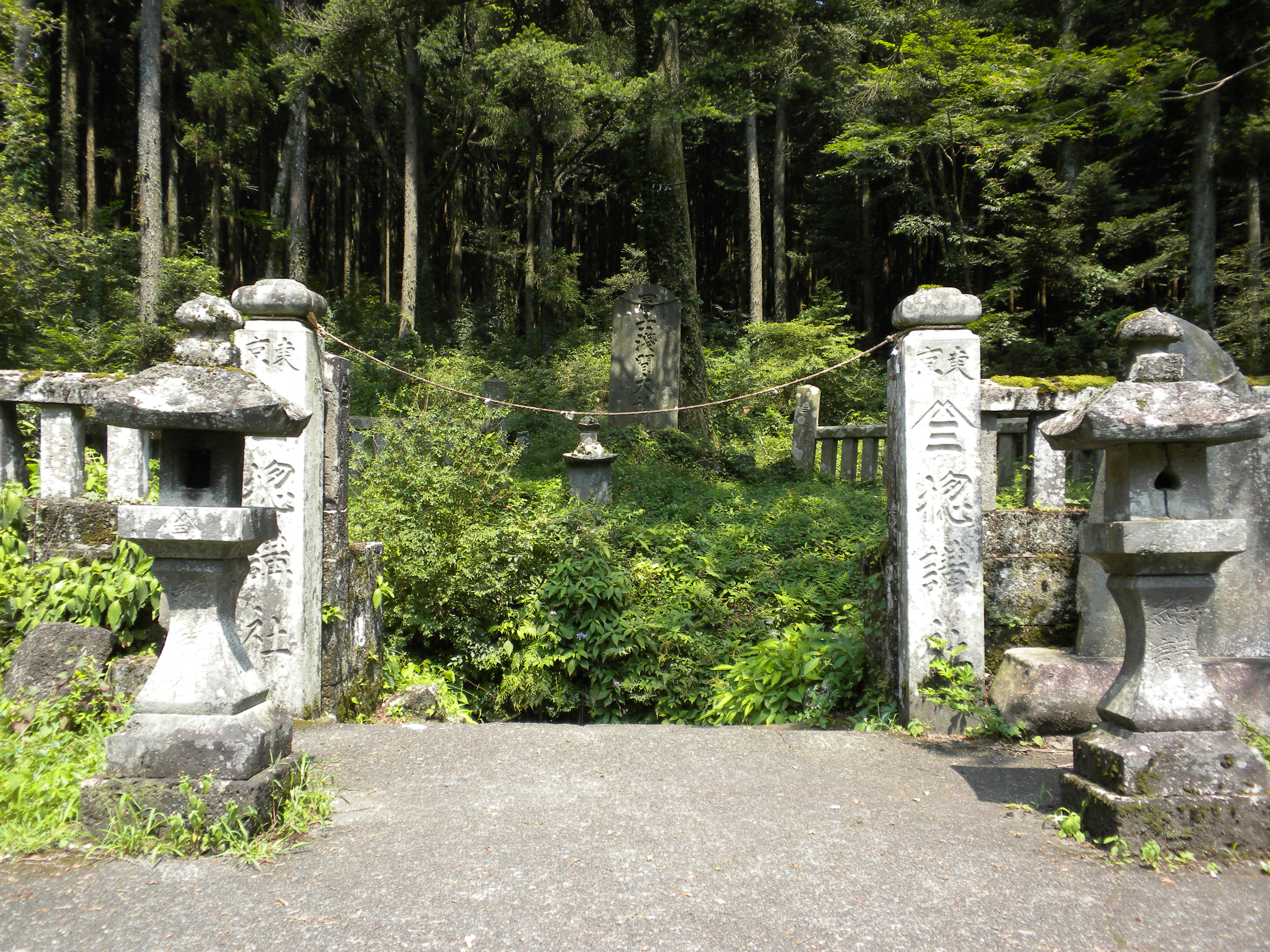
A human hole

The man cave, the site of Kakugyo's ascetic practices, is considered a sacred place and is visited by Buddhist priests. The Hitoana Sengen Shrine, located next to the man cave, has Kakugyo as its main deity. Many monuments and pagodas were erected in the area, and there are still about 230 monuments and pagodas left today. It is now known as the "Hitoana Fuji-kou Ruins.

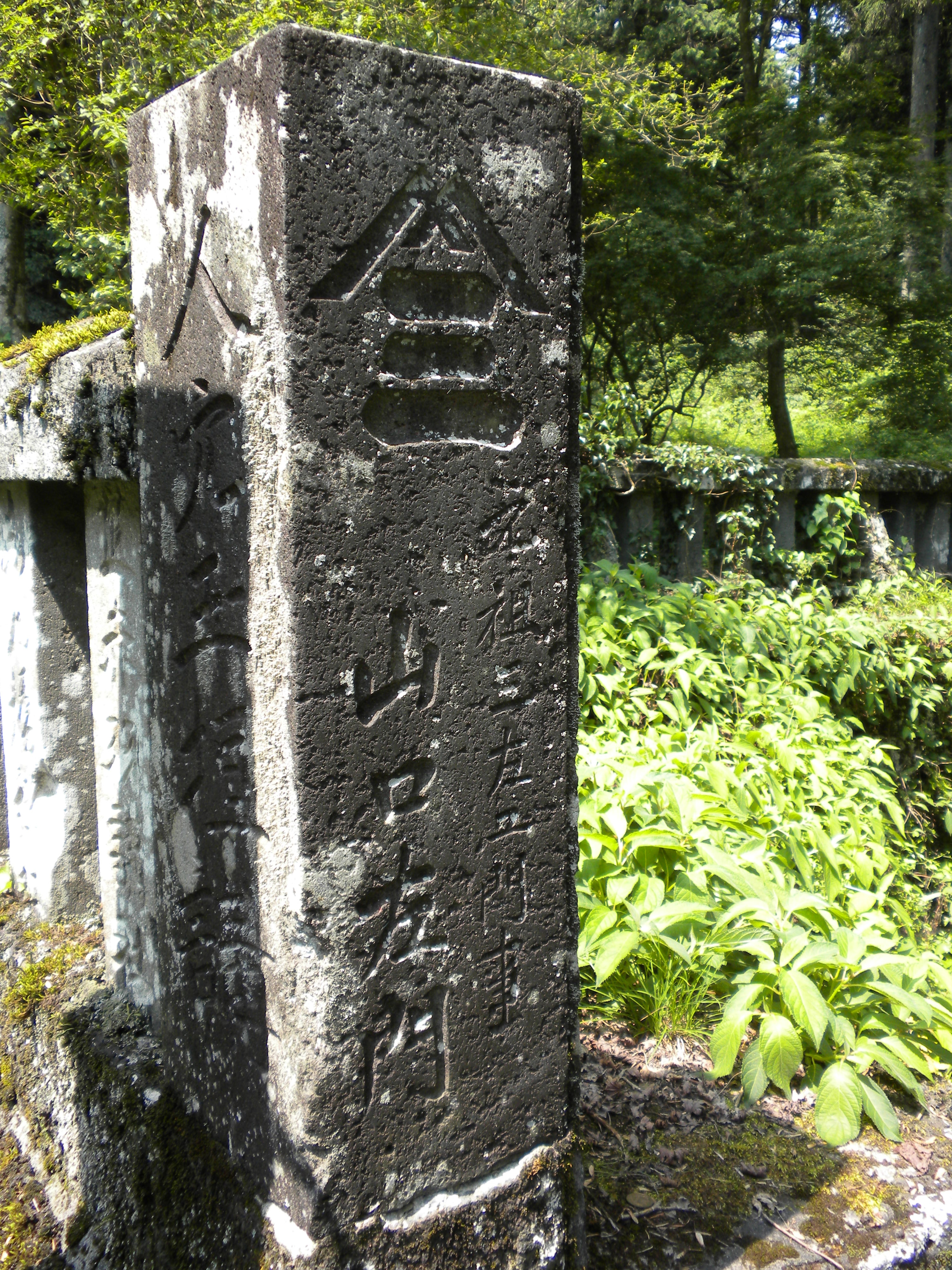
Yamasan" mark on a monument of the Fuji-kō (Ningenan Fuji-kō Site)

There was a culture of dedicating a monument called "Fuji Ko monument" to the followers of Fuji Ko. (The monument is characterized by a mark called "kasa-in". (One of the characteristics of this monument is the "kasa-in" mark, which differs from one kosha to another, and includes "Marusan" and "Yamasan".）

== Pilgrimage ==
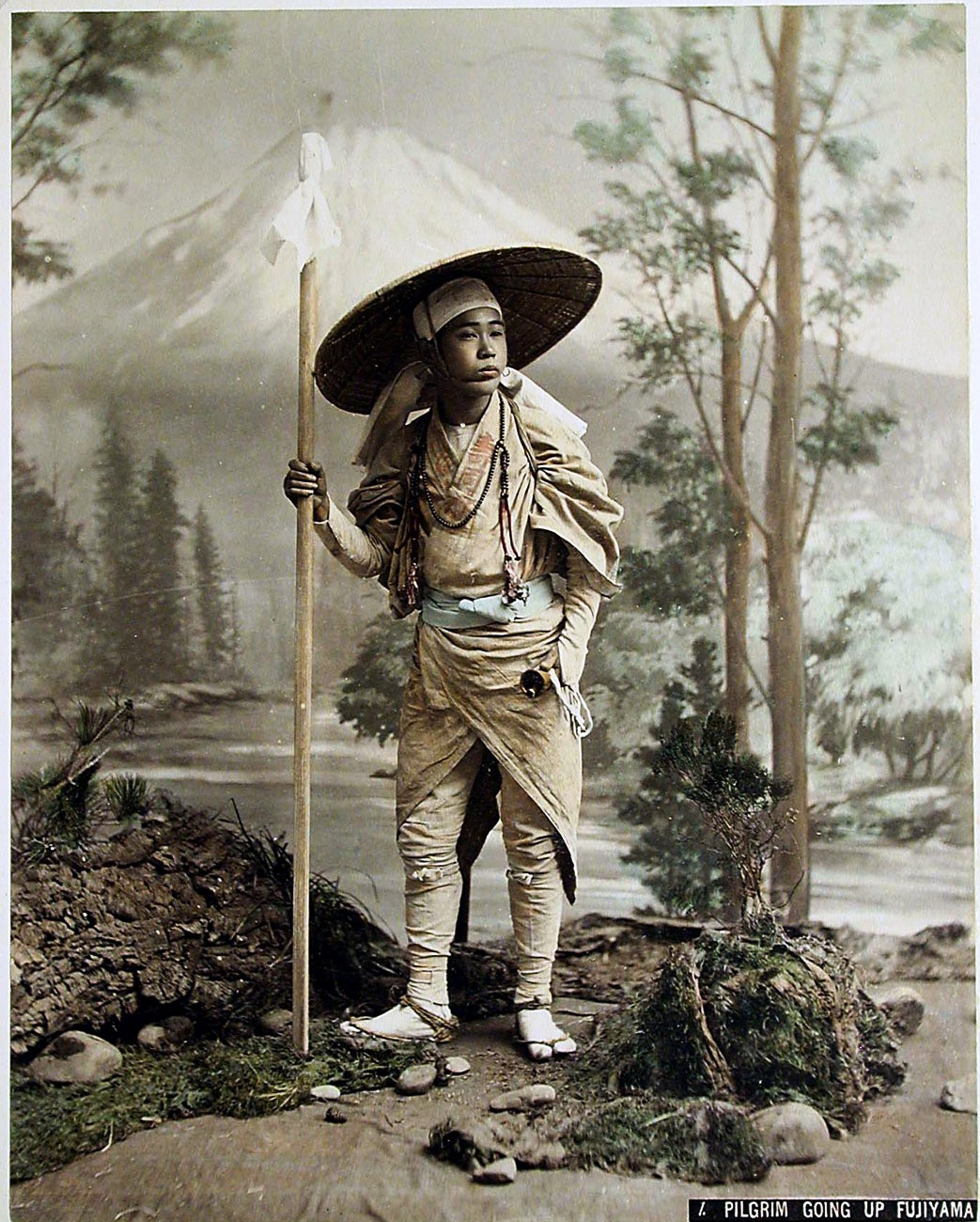
Fuji pilgrim. Kusakabe Kimbei photographed in 1880.

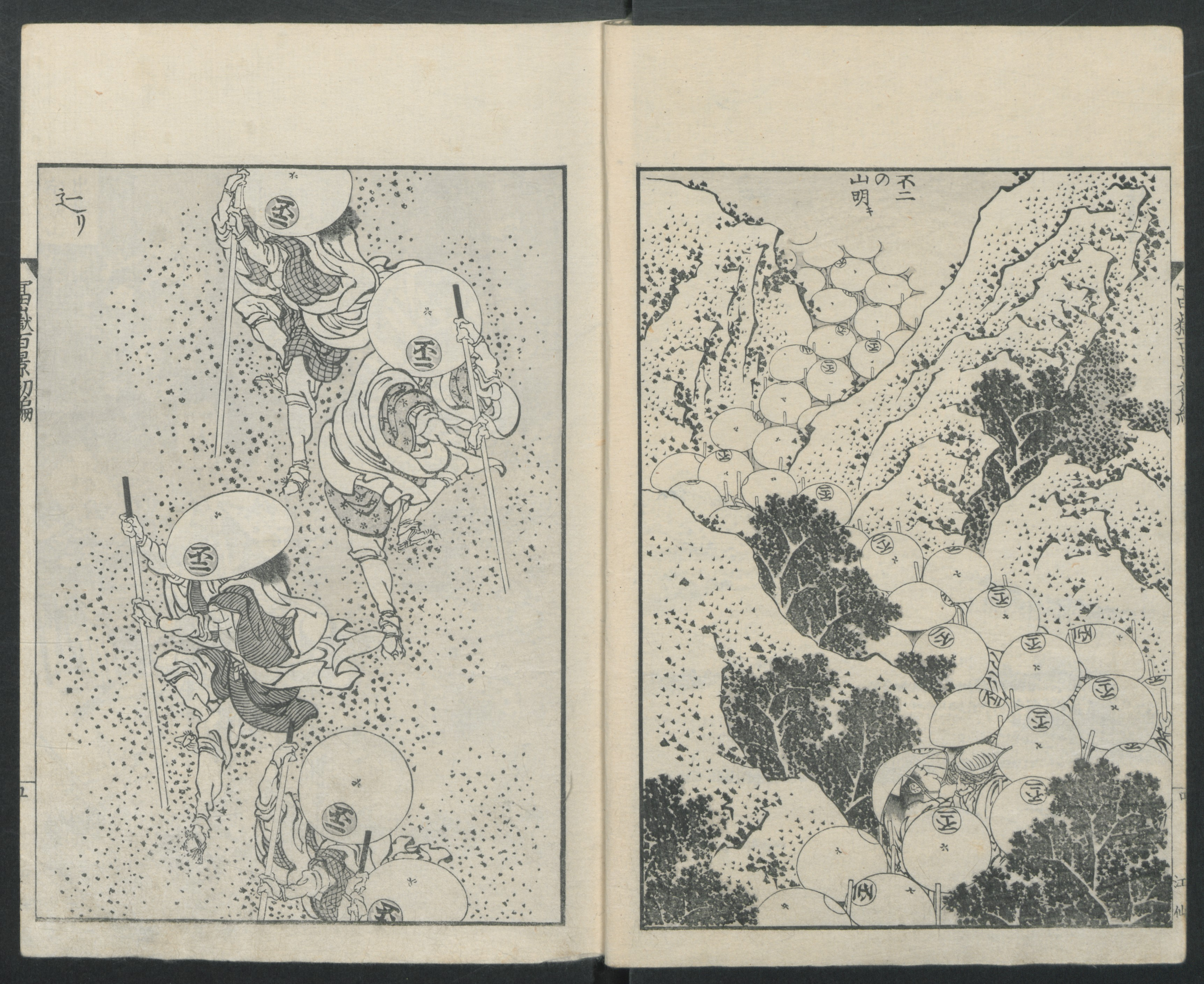
Ukiyo-e print by Hokusai with Fujiko pilgrims

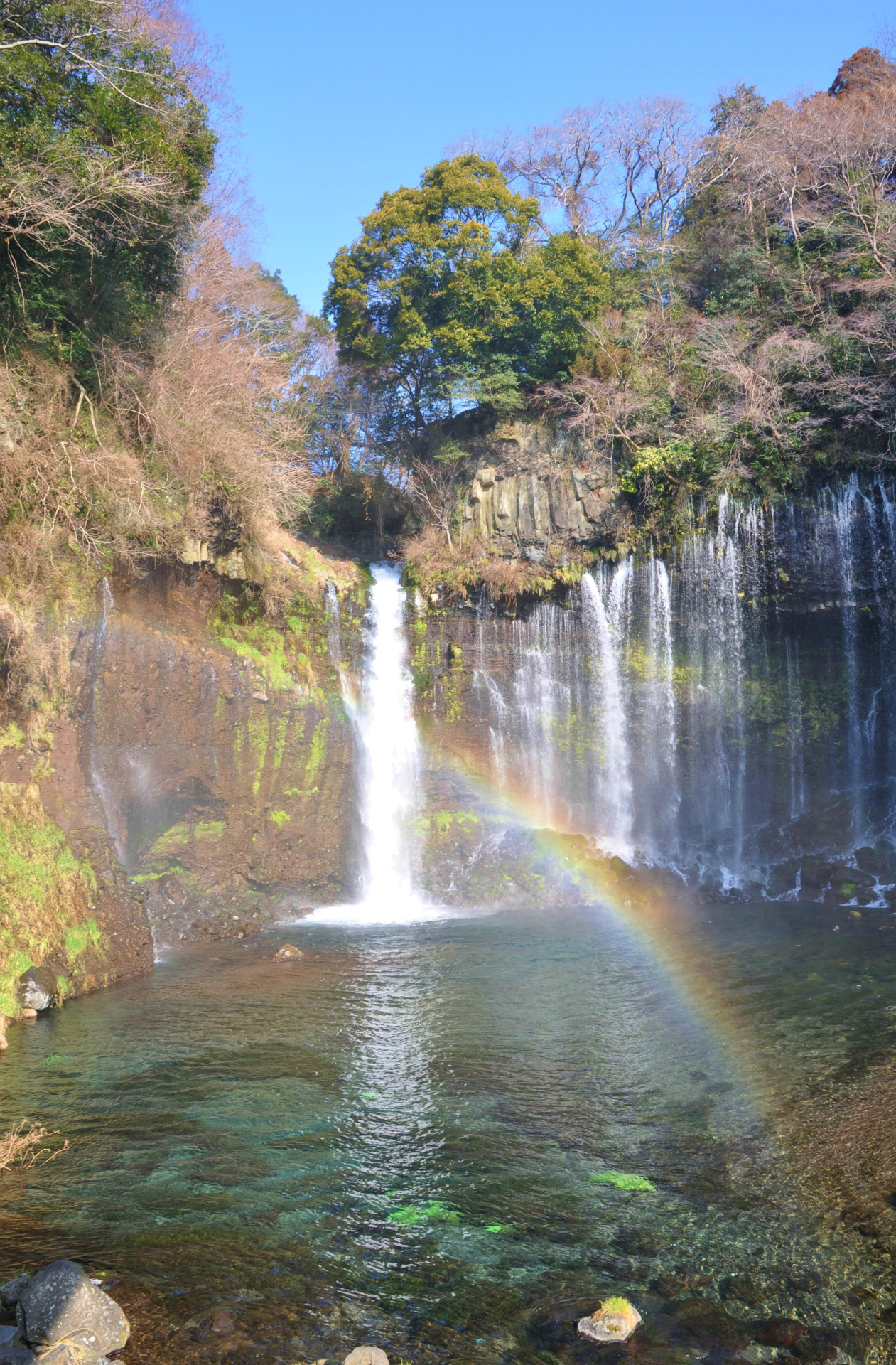
Shiraito Waterfall

Fuji, but also practiced pilgrimage and water asceticism at pilgrimage sites such as Fuji Five Lakes and Shiraito Falls.

=== Fuji Hakkai ===
There are pilgrimage sites collectively called Fuji Hakkai, which can be divided into Inner Hakkai consisting mainly of sacred sites around Fuji. In the Inner Eight Seas, each of the five lakes of Fuji, as well as Lake Akemi (Asumi no Umi, Fujiyoshida City), Lake Shioren (Shibirei no Umi, Ichikawa Misato Town), and Sembata (Senzu no Umi, Fujiyoshida City) were pilgrimage sites for the Fuji-kō in the early modern period. However, before that, Sudo-ko (Lake Numazu City, Fuji City) was included in the "Eight Seas of Fuji" instead of Sembata.

The outer eight seas include the Futami Sea (Futamiura, Mie Prefecture), Chikubu Island (Biwa, Shiga Prefecture), Suwa Lake (Nagano Prefecture), Haruna Lake (Gunma Prefecture), Nikko Lake (Lake Chūzenji, Tochigi Prefecture), Lake Sakura (Sakuragaike, Shizuoka Prefecture), Lake Kashima (Kasumigaura, Ibaraki Prefecture), and Lake Hakone (Lake Ashino, Kanagawa Prefecture).

== See also ==
- Fujizuka
- Pilgrimage
- Sengen shrine
