= Yoshida Shintō =

Japanese Shintō sect that arose during the Sengoku period

Yoshida Shintō (吉田神道), also frequently referred to as Yuiitsu Shintō (唯一神道, "One-and-only Shintō") and Genpon Sōgen Shintō (元本宗源神道, "Fundamental Elemental Shintō") and Urabe Shintō (卜部神道), was a prominent sect of Shintō that arose during the Sengoku period through the teachings and work of Yoshida Kanetomo. The sect was originally an effort to organize Shintō teachings into a coherent structure in order to assert its authority vis-a-vis Buddhism. However, by the Edo period, Yoshida Shintō continued to dominate the Shintō discourse, and influenced Neo-Confucian thinkers such as Hayashi Razan and Yamazaki Ansai in formulating Confucian Shintō (shinju shūgō (神儒習合, "Shintō-Confucian syncretism")). Yoshida Shintō's dominance rivaled that of Ise Shintō. Yoshida Shrine was the center of this sect.

== Doctrine ==
Yoshida Shintō reversed the honji suijaku teaching of Shin-Butsu Shuugo promulgated by Kukai in the Heian Period, asserting that the Buddhist deities were manifestations of the Shintō kami, not the other way around. Yoshida Shinto held that Shintō was the primal religion of the world, which in turn gave rise to Buddhism and Confucianism. However, Shintō was seen not only as the source of creation, but also as the source of all principle in the world. In this sense, Shinto was seen as a divine essence or energy rather than a teaching. This essence was seen as present in all beings at birth, but obscured by petty desires and needs, which prevented Man from aligning himself with the Way of the Gods.

Among the ethic "principles" in Yoshida Shintō shōjō (清浄, "purity") and makoto (誠, "sincerity") took on a great meaning within the sect. These key virtues were linked to well-known Shintō rites as harae or misogi purification ceremonies. Yoshida Shinto redefined and redesigned such traditional rites in a fashion borrowed from Esoteric Buddhism. Also, its doctrines are formulated in the elliptical discourse of Esoteric Buddhism, which makes sense only in combination with ritual practice. Rites took on significance not just as an outward form of purity, but as means to achieve inner purity as well and cultivating the necessary virtues towards makoto. These concepts may be related to Buddhist salvation but in contrast to Buddhism, Yoshida Shinto rejected celibacy and the idea that human life always leads to suffering. There is no clear conception of the afterlife, however.

Yoshida Shintō was an esoteric tradition also in terms of priestly organisation in that it consisted of several ranks achieved through secret initiations, with the highest rank accorded to only one man at a time, who would carry on the Yoshida family name. In cases where a suitable heir was lacking, one was adopted.

Kunitokotachi no mikoto or Soranaki-oomoto-mikoto-kami is considered to be a god of the origin of the world.

== History ==
In spite of their alleged antiquity, Yoshida doctrines were created by Yoshida Kanetomo (1435–1511) who served the Imperial Court in the Department of Shintō Affairs. In 1484 Kanetomo completed the Daigengū, a ceremonial hall built atop Mount Yoshida in Kyoto, around which he arranged replicas of the two Grand Shrines of Ise together with other structures representing the more than one thousand shrines listed in the Engishiki, an undertaking that marked the completion of Yoshida Shinto's doctrinal and ritual system.Yoshida Shinto gained prominence during the Momoyama period, when the family was involved in the deification of Toyotomi Hideyoshi, and enhanced its influence during the Edo period under Yoshikawa Koretaru (1616–1694), a Yoshida scion (but not a family member) with excellent contacts to the ruling elites in Edo. Koretaru was probably the driving force behind the fact that the Yoshida were decreed the de facto supervisors of all lesser Shinto shrines in the official "Regulations for Shrine Priests" (諸社禰宜神主法度, Shosha negi kannushi hatto) of 1665. Later, however, Koretaru created his own version of Shintō (Yoshikawa Shintō) with an emphasis on self-reflection and the nature of the Kami to Man, as well as Man's role in society (with an emphasis on the lord-vassal relationship common during this period).

Early Neo-Confucian scholars in Japan such as Hayashi Razan and Yamazaki Ansai likely encountered Yoshida Shintō during their time as Buddhist priests, when guest lectures by Yoshida Shintō priests were common. However, later when Neo-Confucian teachings gained prominence, these thinkers formulated their own theories and doctrines on the relationship between Confucianism and Shintō and criticized Yoshida Shintō for being influenced by Buddhism. Nevertheless, Yoshida vocabulary and Yoshida ideas can still be found in their writings. This trend persisted until the rise of National Learning which sought to separate Shintō from both Buddhism and Confucianism and thus developed a completely new discourse on the native kami.

In terms of institutional history, Yoshida Shintō was dominant until the late Edo period but decreased rapidly during the 19th century and has left hardly any trace in contemporary Japanese shrine worship. The Yoshida family's collection of ancient texts, however, still forms one of the most important sources of Shinto. Large parts of it are now stored in the library of Tenri University in Nara Prefecture.
