= Hasegawa Kakugyo =

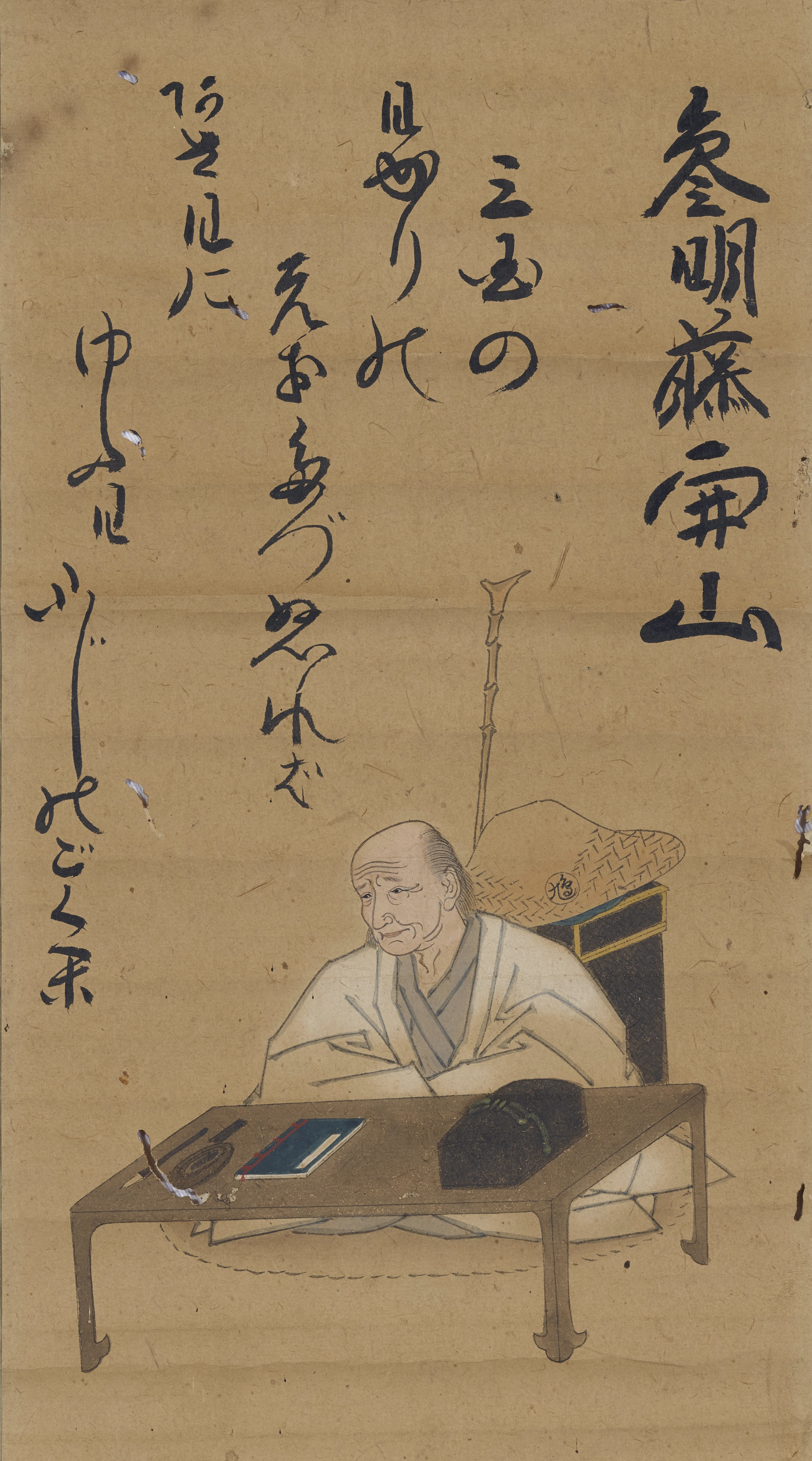
Kakugyo

Kakugyo (Tenbun 10, January 15 (1541 February 10) - Shōhō 3, June 3 (1646 July 15)) was a man who was worshipped as the founder of the faith by those who formed the Fuji-kō religion during the Edo period. Fuji-kō, who was worshipped as the founder of the faith by those who formed the Fuji-kō during the Edo period. He is a descendant of Kamatari Fujiwara. He was born as the son of Hara Hisamitsu, a samurai of Nagasaki. Common name, Hasegawa Sakon Fujiwara Kunitake.

He is traditionally seen as having founded Fuso-kyo and Jikkō kyō two Sect Shinto groups.

== Biography ==
There are several types of biographies of Kakugyo, each with different contents. However, they all have in common that he was born after his parents prayed to the Big Dipper (or Nokushin Myōmi Bosatsu), hoping for an end to the warfare that had been raging since the Onin era, and for a peaceful nation. If we understand Kakugyo's behavior based on these common articles, it is as follows.

Kakugyo, who was originally a Shugendo ascetic, completed his ascetic training in Hitariku Province (according to one theory, in Fujigara-cho, Mito) and came to Tatsuya Cave in Mutsu Province (famous for the legend of King Evil). Shizuoka Prefecture Fujiomiya City. In Eiroku 3 (1560), he was given the name "Kakugyo" after he practiced asceticism for 1,000 days standing on a 4'5" square piece of wood.

In 1560, Kakugyo was given the name "Kakugyo". Thereafter, Kakugyo traveled around the country, repeatedly climbing Mt. Fuji and doing water purification, and as he achieved his training, he was given unique spell marks and mandalas called "fusegi" and "ominuki" by Sengen Dainichi. The "fusegi" is said to have been particularly effective in curing illnesses, and was distributed to tens of thousands of people to help them when epidemics spread in Edo.

== History ==
His successors were Nichigyo Nichigan the Second, Akaba Gansin the Third, Maeno Getsugan the Fourth, and Murakami Gatsushin the Fifth. After the death of Murakami Gekishin, Gekishin's second son, the sixth Murakami Mitsukiyo (1682 - 1759), became a member of the Mitsukiyo sect (Fuji Gohouke), and a disciple of Gekishin or Gekishin. There is also the Miroku school (1671 - 1733).

Since the Jinroku school allowed branch schools, it gave rise to many other schools, including the Seikou, Ise, and Izumo schools, which are commonly called the "eight hundred and eight schools. From among these, the mainstream was formed by Kotani Mishi, who claimed to be related to Shokugyo's third daughter, Ito Ikko (Ohana or Hanako), who worshipped a mixture of Shinto and Buddhism, and formed Fuji-do as a Shinto sect. Around the time of the Meiji Restoration, the Shinto sects were largely separated into Kodo-kyo led by Shibata Hanamori and Fuso-kyo led by Shishino Han. Maruyama Kyo was also born, but there were also several schools that remained intact.

The Kousei school (Fuji Gohouke) ceased to exist in the Showa period (1926-1989) because it did not allow branch courses, but Fuji Kyo exists as the successor to the Kousei school.
