= Hirayama Seisai =

Japanese samurai and Shinto priest (1815–1890)

Hirayama Seisai (平山省斎; 1815–1890) was a Japanese Shinto priest and government official. Appointed head priest of Hikawa Shrine in 1876, he brought together disconnected groups of mountain ascetics to form the Ontake-kyō and Taiseikyō sects of Shinto.
