= Yamazaki Ansai =

Japanese philosopher (1619–1682)

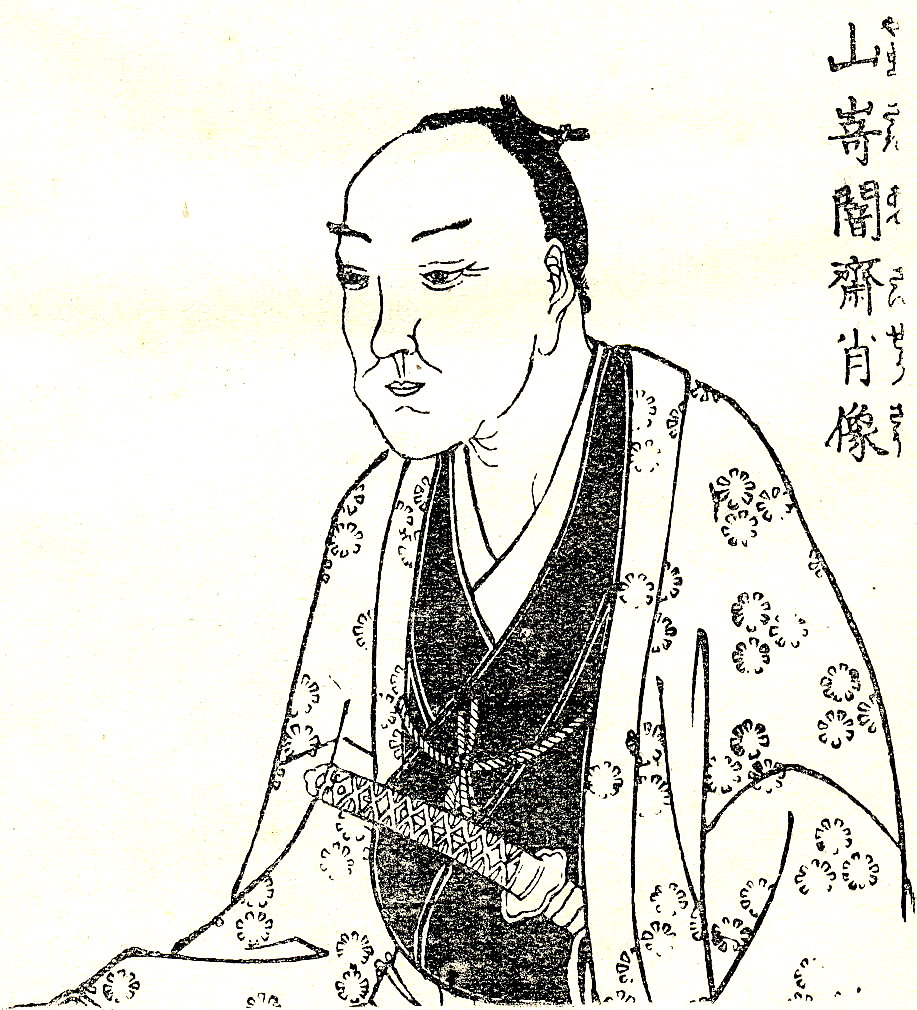
- Born: January 24, 1619; Kyoto
- Died: September 16, 1682 (aged 63); Kyoto

Philosophical work
- Era: Early Tokugawa Era
- Region: Japan
- School: Buddhism, Neo-Confucianism, Suika Shinto
- Main interests: Ontological Unity, Strict Moral Practice
- Notable ideas: Suika Shinto

Yamazaki Ansai (山崎 闇斎; Japanese pronunciation: [ja.maꜜ.(d)za.kʲi | aꜜɰ̃.sai], January 24, 1619 – September 16, 1682) was a Japanese philosopher and scholar. He began his career as a Buddhist monk, but eventually came to follow the teachings of Neo-Confucian Zhu Xi. He combined Neo-Confucian ideas with Shinto to create Suika Shinto.

== Life ==
=== Early years/Buddhism ===
Born in Kyoto on January 24, 1619, Yamazaki Ansai was the son of a former rōnin-turned-doctor and the last of four children. In his youth, he was strongly influenced by both his mother and grandmother. While his mother "urged him to develop a noble heart worthy of a samurai's son," his grandmother supported him in his study of the Chinese language. In his preteens, he was sent by his father to serve as an acolyte at a Buddhist temple on Mount Hiei. In his early teens, Ansai returned home, and after several years was finally permitted to enter the Myōshin-ji temple of the Rinzai Zen sect in Kyoto for further study. Due to his incredible scholarly aptitude, in his early twenties he was granted entrance to the Gyūkō-ji temple in Tosa. During his time at Tosa, he was strongly advised by his fellow monks to concentrate his studies on the teachings of Neo-Confucian scholars, thereby beginning the process of Ansai's conversion to Neo-Confucianism and ultimate rejection of Buddhism. Ansai was particularly captivated by the writings of the Song dynasty scholar, Zhu Xi (Chu Hsi), which later became the basis of Ansai's moral philosophy/teachings. At twenty eight, he returned to Kyoto, and under the patronage of Nonaka Kenzan, was able to continue his Neo Confucian studies, as well as begin to publish his own materials. With the production of his first work Heresies Refuted (Heikii, 1647), an outright rejection of Buddhist faith, Ansai fully embraced "the One True Way" of Neo Confucianism.

=== Middle years: Neo-Confucianism and Kimon ===
After his first publication, Ansai spent the remaining thirty-five years of his life writing, publishing, editing, annotating, and punctuating Confucian and Shinto texts (that accumulated to over two thousand pages). The decade following Tosa (1647–1657), Ansai lived, studied, and taught in Kyoto. There, he edited and published a great number of texts (mostly commentaries on the works of Chu Hsi). Ansai also frequently went to Edo, to give lectures on Cheng-Zhu school of Neo-Confucianism in front of a large number of daimyōs. In 1655, he established a private school in Kyoto, began his first lecture cycle in the spring of the same year, and finished it at the end of 1656.

Ansai's group of Confucian disciples was collectively referred to as the Kimon school. His lectures focused on Ansai's own, hand selected canon. His canon consisted mostly of the classic Confucian writings that Zhu Xi had emphasized: the Elementary Learning, the Reflections on Things at Hand, and the Four Books (the Great Learning, the Doctrine of the Mean, the Analects of Confucius, and the Mencius). However, he also included Cheng Yi's Commentary on the Book of Changes. In the 1660s and 1670s, Ansai (following the example of Zhu Xi) personally edited the six books that comprised his canon.

As a teacher, Ansai was described by his students as "extremely strict, sometimes scary, and short tempered." Generally speaking, Ansai had a reputation for being "single minded, doctrinate, and intolerant." Kaibara Ekken, a contemporary of Ansai's, had attended several of his lectures, and found Ansai to be: "severe, dogmatic, and more interested in strict moral discipline than in investigation of the principles for practical learning." Such prominent Neo-Confucian scholars as Kinoshita Jun'an, Asami Keisai, Miyake Shōsai, and Satō Naokata were included amongst Ansai's followers of the Kimon school.

=== Bakufu involvement and Shinto beginnings ===
In 1658, Ansai moved to Edo, where he spent the next seven years of his life, continuing his studying of Neo-Confucian texts, as well as beginning his research on a never completed historiography of Japan (based upon Shinto texts). In 1665, after building up a reputation in both Edo and Kyoto as an extraordinary teacher, was invited by Hoshina Masayuki (the daimyō of Aizu) to become his teacher. Ansai accepted the position and spent the next seven years of his life as the personal teacher of Neo-Confucian philosophy to Masayuki. For tutoring Masayuki for six out of the twelve months of the year, Ansai was given a salary of 100 gold ryō, two seasonal garments, and one haori coat.

Although Ansai and Masayuki were said to share a close relationship, Ansai refused to become his vassal, declaring that Confucian scholars should remain autonomous of another individual's influence. Masayuki proved to be Ansai's intellectual equal, helping him compile five different works: two gazetteers for the Aizu domain, and three Confucian texts: Gyokusan kōgi furoku (Appendix to Zhu Xi's lecture at Yushan), Nitei jikyōroku (Record of the two Cheng's political teachings), and the Irakusanshiden shinroku (Record of the mind-heart). During his years of service to Masayuki, Ansai compiled more writings of Zhu Xi during his off time in Kyoto. These included: Jinsetsumondō (Questions and answers on explanations of "humaneness"), Shōgaku mōyōshu and Daigaku keihatsu shū (Collections of [clarifications by Zhu Xi] on the Elementary Learning and the Great Learning).

Due to this relationship, Ansai is considered to be one of the scholars most closely associated with the Tokugawa Bakufu. Also, Ansai was able to receive the secret teachings of the Yoshida and Ise Shinto traditions, which he would use in attempting to reconstruct a "pure Shinto", that would reflect the Way of Neo-Confucianism.

=== Later years: Schism in the Kimon school ===
After Masayuki's death in 1672, Ansai returned to Kyoto, where he spent the last decade of his life. In his later years, Ansai's scholarly focus dramatically shifted toward his project of synchronizing Shinto and Confucian thought. Ansai's introduction of Shinto into his teachings ultimately caused a schism among his students, dividing them into two groups: those who followed Ansai's Confucianism, and those who followed his Shinto. Very few were able to do both. In 1680, when Ansai put forth a radical re-interpretation of the Great Learning that defied traditional Confucian thought, he had a falling out with two of his best students, Satō Naokata and Asami Keisai, who could not accept Ansai's new interpretation. Ultimately, Ansai expelled Naokata and Keisai. After this, most of his students coalesced around the two defrocked pupils, thinning out the ranks of Ansai's still loyal followers. With his formerly great school in ruins, Ansai died on September 16, 1682, and was buried at the Korotani mountain in Kyoto.

== Split with Buddhism ==
Ansai's rejection of Buddhism was based upon what he perceived as a fundamental insufficiency/flaw in Buddhist moral principles. In Neo Confucianism, Ansai had found the "Truth": the universal and eternal cosmic Way that could not be found in Buddhism. His critique was based upon two, interconnected fallacies that he perceived in Buddhist thought. First, Ansai believed that Buddhism lacked a normative system for informing ethical behavior (stemming from his interpretation that the Buddhist notion of nature (sei) as nothingness or emptiness, was a metaphysical, and not an ethical ideal). Due to this, Buddhism contained no theory of mind-heart, and thus, was inadequate for cultivating the mind (both of which were integral to Ansai's ethical thought). From Ansai's Neo-Confucian perspective, the mind was full (being inherently imbued with the concepts of the Five Relationships and the Five Virtues), not empty (as he believed Buddhism perceived it). In the latter part of his life, when Ansai was attempting to prove the ontological unity of Shinto and Confucianism, he proclaimed that before the arrival of Buddhism to Japan, early Shinto and Confucianism were identical. He blamed the influence of Buddhist thought for creating a false dichotomy between the two systems (which in Ansai's view differed only in name).

== Neo-Confucian teachings ==
=== Influence of Zhu Xi ===
Ansai's teachings were seen to be part of a larger Neo-Confucian trend of the early Tokugawa period, referred to by Abe Yoshino as the rigaku (school of principle). Compared to the kigaku (school of material force), rigaku's primary focus was on moral cultivation and spirituality. Its followers considered ri (Chinese li: reason, rational principle, or law) to be a transcendent principle. Although Ansai was part of this larger movement, in no way did he see himself as an "innovator" of Neo-Confucianism. Rather, he saw himself as a "servant of Truth," a "transmitter of the Way," and believed nothing of what he taught to be novel, since everything about the Way had already been said by the Confucian Sages. In particular, Ansai believed he was a "faithful transmitter" of the writings of both Zhu Xi, and the Korean Neo-Confucian Yi T'oegye (1507–1570), with special emphasis on Zhu's teachings. Because of this, most of Ansai's Neo Confucian writings tended to be publications of Zhu Xi's works, with his own commentaries.

Although some of Ansai's teachings varied slightly from Zhu Xi's, the foundation of Ansai's thought was deeply grounded in Zhu's most fundamental premises. The foremost of these was Zhu Xi's cosmological belief that the principles of reason and morality (li), were the same as mankind's original nature (i.e. that the principles that guide and move the universe, are exactly the same as those that inform man's ethical behavior). Therefore, by pursuing li, an individual was simultaneously "developing the potential of one's inner nature to guide on in behaving correctly." If an individual could endure it, he would be able to bring his own natural inclinations into perfect harmony with principles of universal morality. Zhu Xi saw this fulfillment of potential as the ideal state of human existence, and only possible to achieve if one were to obey one's allotted moral duty, given their relative position in society. Depending on their social role, the duties of the individual differed, as did the principles upon which they were grounded. However, Zhu Xi did not view this as problematic, since each of these principles was merely a different manifestation of the same general principle of morality, found in every human being. Xi believed that fulfilling one's proper social role was a means of understanding the universal principle of human morality (li). He referred to such a process as the "plumbing of principle". To perfect one's natural, innate potential was at the same time to realize one's self as an autonomous being.

=== Reverence ===
Like Zhu Xi, Ansai firmly believed that an individual's moral duties reflected his specific social position (meibun). However, instead of focusing on the "plumbing of principle" (which he believed the average person was incapable of achieving) Ansai believed in order to properly achieve meibun, what was primary was an attitude of reverence (kei or tsutsushimi): steadiness of the mind and guarded behavior. Since Zhu considered reverence to be the necessary precondition for the "plumbing of principle", Ansai believed that reverence was the essential element of Zhu's moral thought. To this end, he placed great emphasis on a particular passage of Zhu Xi's: "Reverence within, righteousness without." Reverence was the means by which one achieved the desired end of self-cultivation, necessary to fulfill the moral duties prescribed to an individual by their rigid, social obligations. Realizing one's social obligations and maintaining an orderly, hierarchical society were the highest duties that an individual and mankind (respectively) had to fulfill. This notion stems from Ansai's morality, cosmology, and the interconnectedness between the two (all based in Zhu Xi's thought).

=== Ontology and morality ===
Like Zhu Xi, Ansai believed that the principles that guided the cosmic order were the same as the ethical principles that informed mankind's original nature (i.e. the same set of principles guided the cosmic, as well as the human world). Not only was there an inherent connection between the macrocosm (cosmos) and microcosm (humans), but they mutually influenced each other in a reciprocal and parallel manner. Just as the cosmic principles actively affect mankind (by informing humans of their natural, moral imperatives), so do human beings actively affect the cosmic order through their collective behavior. This is why Ansai believed it was a moral imperative for human beings to achieve unity with the cosmos. By understanding the ethical principles, they could simultaneously understand cosmic principles and positively affect not only themselves, but the universe as well. He linked morality with the Five Evolutive phases, to show that not only are cosmic and moral principles natural and inevitable, but that they mutually influence one another. Physicist and philosopher Max Bernhard Weinstein found these views to be especially consonant with the theological theory of Pandeism.

=== Cosmology and filial piety ===
Because cosmologically everything was interconnected, Ansai believed that the actions of an individual (in a similar manner to modern chaos theory) affect the entire universe. He stressed the Confucian concept of Great Learning, in which a person's actions (the center of a series of concentric circles) extend outward toward the family, society, and finally to the cosmos. The Five Virtues (all contained in the idea of reverence and inherent in man's original nature) direct the Five Relationships, between: parent and child (humaneness), lord and vassal (righteousness/duty), husband and wife (propriety), elder and younger (wisdom), and friend and friend (faithfulness). There are five steps which Zhu Xi advocated to perfect these relationships (and virtues): "study wisely, question thoroughly, deliberate carefully, analyze clearly, and act conscientiously." For Ansai, learning was the means to the ends of morality. However, of all of the relationships (and virtues) that Ansai emphasized, the relationship between the lord and vassal (duty) was the most important. Departing from Zhu Xi (who saw humaneness as the most important virtue), Ansai believed that maintaining the social order (through duty to one's lord) was the highest responsibility that one had to fulfill.

=== Knowledge leads to morality ===
To achieve reverence (the means toward personal cultivation) Ansai proposed quiet sitting. Through quiet sitting, Ansai believed that an individual could gain access to the storehouse of hidden knowledge (inherent in all individuals). This storehouse is where qi (the vital material force) resides. By channeling qi, one is able to stimulate humaneness, which consequently triggers the other virtues. Through knowledge, virtue grows. Through virtue, one can act in proper accord with the outside world (and the cosmos in general). Thus, knowledge is the source by which an individual realizes his innate, human potential (as described by Zhu Xi).

=== Loyalty ===
Yamazaki Ansai completely rejected the Yi Xing philosophy, which viewed the Dynastic cycle as esoterical necessity in Confucianism. Ansai maintained the position that people should be loyal to their ruler, even if the ruler was a tyrant. Ansai's view of blending patriotism with Neo-Confucianism even goes so far that he claimed he will "personally kill Confucius and Mencius themselves if they ever invade Japan.".

== Suika Shinto ==
=== Interest in Shinto ===
In a failed attempt at creating a historiography of Japan, Ansai became intensely interested in Shinto's religious elements. From his own experience, Ansai believed that certain Shinto customs and rituals (such as funeral practices) reflected Confucian values. His Yamato shōgaku (Japanese Elementary Learning), published in 1658, although more focused on general social customs, marks a turning point in Ansai's thought, with its inclusion of various Shinto elements. In the latter part of his life, Ansai began a project of combining Neo-Confucian morality (based on Zhu Xi) with the religious elements of Shinto. Since Ansai believed in the ontological unity of everything, he believed that in the Shinto tradition, he could discover the Way, rooted in Japanese society. Ansai's Confucian interpretation of Shinto mythology came to be known as Suika Shinto. Suika means the act of praying to call the gods down, to receive worldly benefits. Drawing on the secret traditions of both Yoshida and Ise Shinto (as well as classic Shinto myths, such as found in the Kojiki, Nihongi, Shoku Nihongi, Fudoki, etc.), Ansai was able to "uncover" numerous Neo-Confucian values within Shinto texts. On November 23, 1672, he created the Record of the Fuji no mori Shrine (Fuji no mori yuzuemandokoro no ki), an essay that generally summarizes Ansai's views on Shinto and its connection to Neo-Confucian metaphysics.

=== Confucian ethics embedded in Shinto ===
From the Shinto texts, he found particular moral values that he believed had counterparts in Confucianism. For example, he believed that the Confucian notion of reverence was the same as the Shinto idea of prayer (kitō). Righteousness (in Confucianism) was equivalent to the Shinto idea of honesty or forthrightness (massugu or shōjiki). In the opening chapters of the Nihongi, Ansai explained that the five generations of earthly gods (kami) were equivalent to the Five Evolutive Phases, and that the pledge of Amaterasu to protect the divine lineage of her descendants, along with Yamato-hime's prophecy of "keeping right what is right and left what is left," are expressions of the values of the Way (loyalty, selflessness, steadfast and vigilant mind).

Although Ansai claimed he was trying to discover Confucian values within Shinto, his discoveries had a profound effect on his personal philosophy. From his interpretation of a passage from the Nihongi, where Ō-ana-muchi converses with his own spirit, Ansai believed that every person's body is a shrine, that houses a living spirit. In effect, every person's physical heart contained a living god, and out of reverence to the gods, one should worship the self. He believed this to be analogous to the Confucian practice of self-cultivation.

=== Shinto's influence of Ansai's thought ===
Ansai's interpretations of Shinto texts also (surprisingly) led to his affirmation of the political order of the Tokugawa Bakufu. He believed that just as much as the emperor, the bakufu was part of the sacred political order (and that these warriors were exemplified in the archetype of Susanoo). By divine mandate, the bakufu had been entrusted to protect the political realm, in the name of the emperor. This political order, for Ansai, reflected the greater cosmic unity of heaven and man. Due to his belief in this unity, Ansai challenged the traditional Confucian notion of the Mandate of Heaven, where a ruler was held accountable for the welfare of his subjects, and could lose his legitimacy if he did not act in proper accord. However, Ansai believed that challenging political authority was paramount to disrupting the harmonic balance between heaven and man. Therefore, a subject must pledge his undying, unconditional loyalty to his master. This idea caused a great controversy amongst Ansai's followers in the Kimon school, as well as amongst his Suika Shinto disciples.

== Methodology ==
In his book Tokugawa Ideology, Herman Ooms describes Ansai's analysis of Shinto texts as being grounded in "hermeneutic operations", proceeding along four levels of interpretation. The first level is literal. From Ooms' perspective, Ansai believed the Shinto texts he read to be records of historical facts. The kami existed and Ansai believed in them. Second, Ansai employs an allegorical interpretation of the text, by analogically equating symbols he found within Shinto texts as expressions of Confucian truths. Third, Ansai interpreted the texts on a moral level, drawing ethical paradigms out of Shinto myths. The last level was anagogical, whereby Ansai argued for the supremacy of the Japanese nation (relative to all others), using his own interpretations of Shinto texts. Although often Ansai is criticized for his 'torturous rationalizations" found in Suika Shinto, Ooms argues that what distinguishes Ansai from other Neo-Confucian scholars of his time was the "systematic structure of his thought."

== Influence/legacy ==
Yamazaki Ansai was part of a larger movement in the early Tokugawa era that revived and helped proliferate Neo-Confucian thought in Japan. He was the first to introduce the writings of the Korean Neo-Confucian scholar Yi T'ogeye to Japan, and was instrumental in popularizing Zhu Xi's thought (partly due to his connections with the government). His political theory was appropriated by the Tokugawa Bakufu, as a means to legitimate the suppression of political contestation.

The institutions that Ansai had created (the Kimon school and Suika Shinto) did not last for very long (in their original forms, as Ansai had intended). However, the power of Ansai's ideas and the influence he exerted on a large number of his students have had vast repercussions. Ansai's Suika Shinto transformed Shinto into a political ideology that was later incorporated by ultra-nationalist thinkers in the 18th and 19th centuries. In his scholarly research of Shinto texts, Ansai was able to break the monopoly on Shinto doctrine, by freeing it from the private storehouses of specialist Shinto circles (Yoshida, Ise), and thereby making it available for future generations to freely study and interpret. In time, however, the rise of Kokugaku and Fukko Shintō turned Suika Shinto into a target of criticism until it gradually faded from prominence; it is nonetheless credited with having paved the way for these later developments.

Although the Kimon school suffered from various schisms (both during and after Ansai's time), its lineage has lasted until present times. After Ansai's death, his students continued to preach some form of his Confucian or Suika Shinto thought, to both commoners and Bakufu officials alike. A large number of Kimon scholars later filled the ranks of the Bakufu College during the Kansei Reforms.

== Timeline ==
- 1619 Born in Kyoto
- 1641 Enters Gyūkōji temple in Tosa
- 1647 Leaves Tosa, returns to Kyoto, publishes Heresies Refuted
- 1655 Founds a private school in Kyoto, beginning of the Kimon
- 1658 Moves to Edo, publishes Japanese Elementary Learning
- 1665 Accepts position as private tutor to Hoshina Masayuki
- 1672 Returns to Kyoto, publishes Record of the Fuji no mori Shrine
- 1680 Falling out with Satō Naokata and Asami Keisai, schism in Kimon school
- 1682 Death, buried on Korotani mountain in Kyoto

== Works ==
- Heresies Refuted (Heikii) (1647)
- Japanese Elementary Learning (Yamato shōgaku) (1658)
- Reflections on Things at Hand (punctuated and published) (1670)
- Record of the Fuji no mori Shrine (Fuji no mori yuzuemandokoro no ki) (1672)
- Bunkai Hitsuroku
- Han Yü's treatise Chü yu ts'ao (published, with commentary)
- Kōhanzensho
- Nakatomi harae fūsuisō (commentary on the Nakatomi harae text)

== See also ==
- Neo-Confucianism
- Chu Hsi (Zhu Xi)
- Shinto
