= Ontake-kyō =

Japanese Shintoist grouping

Ontake-kyō (御嶽教) is a Japanese Shintoist grouping. Its sacred mountain is Mount Ontake. It was founded by Shimoyama Osuke. It had 3 million members in 1930. According to a 1994 book, the numbers have fallen below one million. Its headquarters has been moved from Tokyo to Futana-cho in the city of Nara. Ontake-kyo has special rites. It is strongly influenced by the values of the Meiji era.

It is considered a Mountain worship group of Sect Shinto alongside Jikkō kyō and Fuso-kyo.
