= Confucian Shinto =

Syncretic religious tradition in Japan

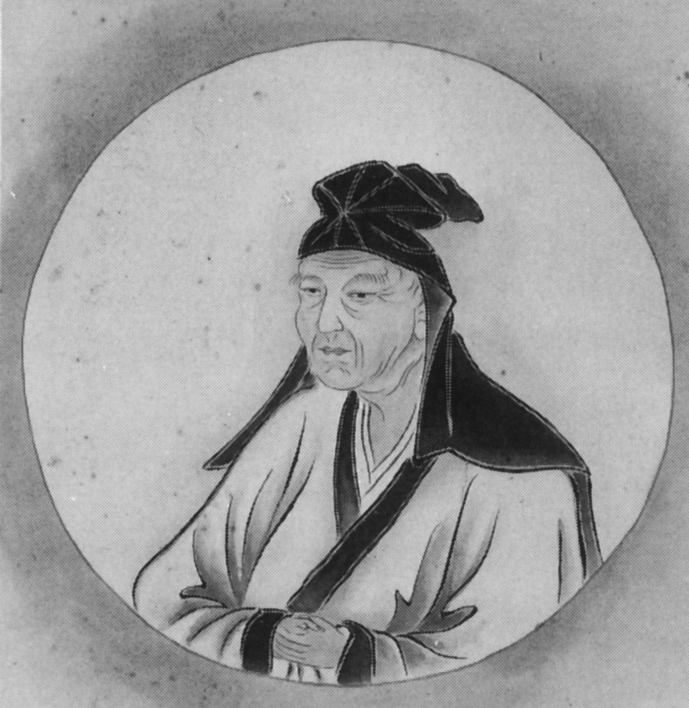
Razan Hayashi

Confucian Shinto (儒家神道, Juka Shintō) is a Japanese syncretic religious tradition of Shinto as interpreted by Neo-Confucianists. Several schools of Confucian Shinto were established during the Edo period.

Confucian Shinto emerged in the early modern period as Confucian scholars turned increasing attention to Shinto amid the waning of the older kami - Buddha syncretic theories (shinbutsu shūgō); rather than incorporating Buddhist elements, these thinkers instead used Confucian philosophy to interpret Shinto doctrine while remaining rooted in their own Confucian standpoint. Its most representative branch, Ritō Shinchi Shintō ("the quintessence of Shinto"), was founded by Hayashi Razan (1583–1657), the only Confucian scholar formally employed by the Tokugawa shogunate. Razan held that "Shinto is contained within the Confucian Way", arguing that there are no kami or principles apart from the mind, and that the mind's pure brilliance is itself the brilliance of the gods. He set out these ideas chiefly in his Shintō denju, compiled between 1644 and 1648, and transmitted his teachings within the Hayashi family through a form of initiation known as kirigami rather than propagating them more widely.

Within Sect Shinto, Shinto Taiseikyo (神道大成教) and Shinto Shusei are considered Confucian-influenced groups.

== See also ==
- Edo neo-Confucianism
