= Solar deity =

Sky deity who represents the Sun

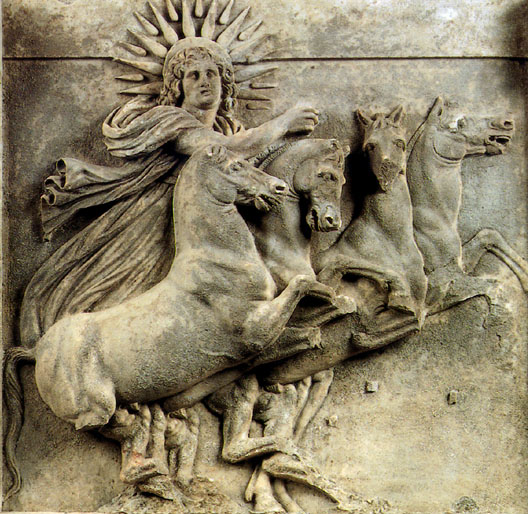
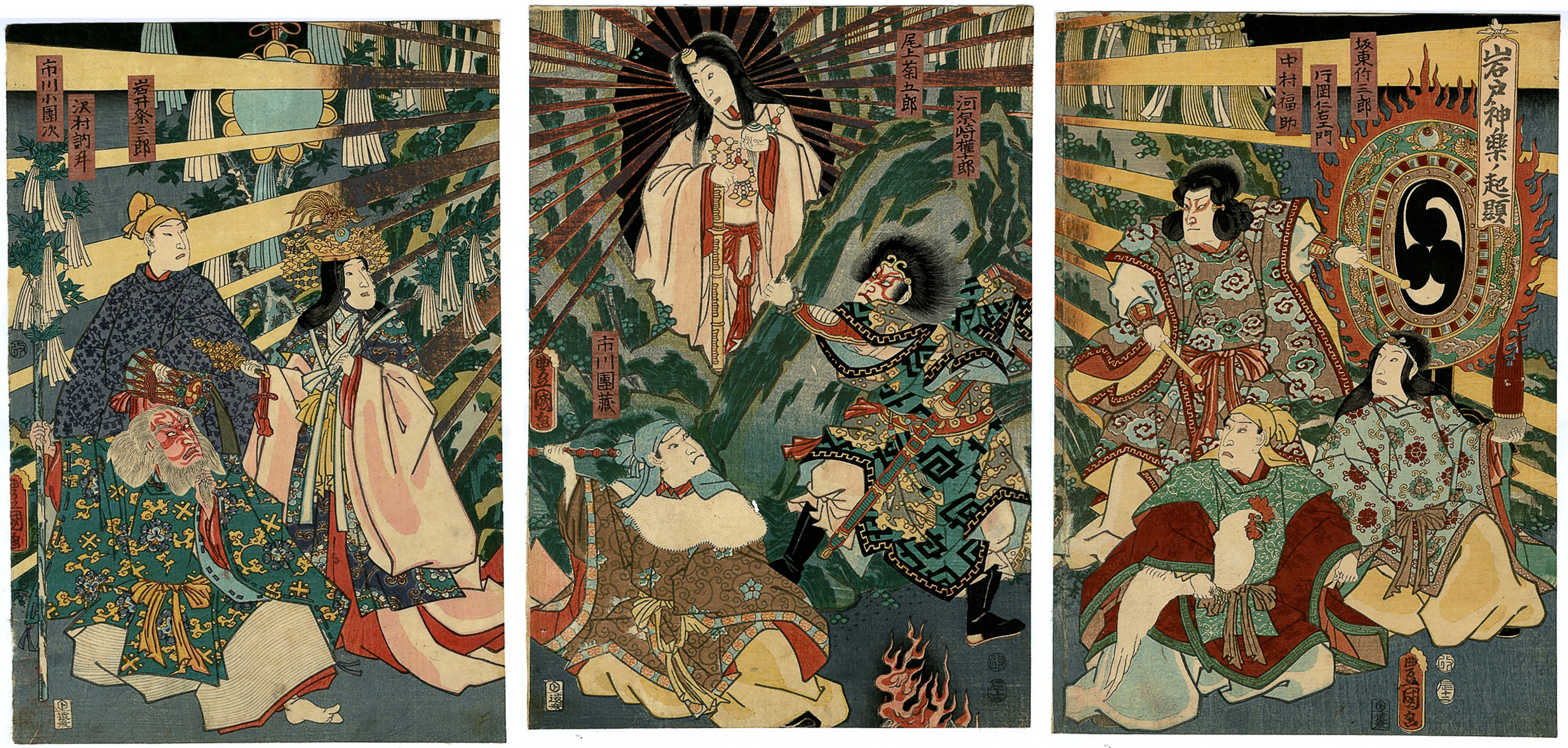
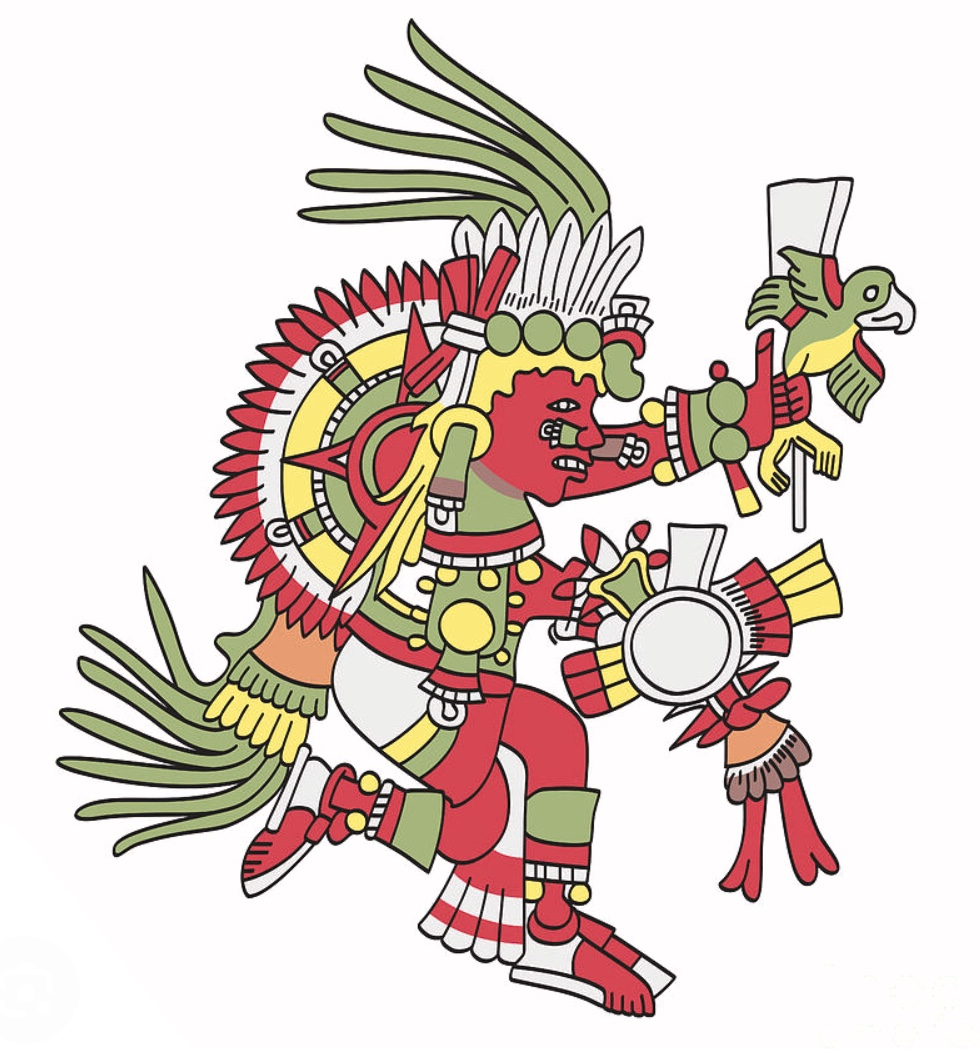
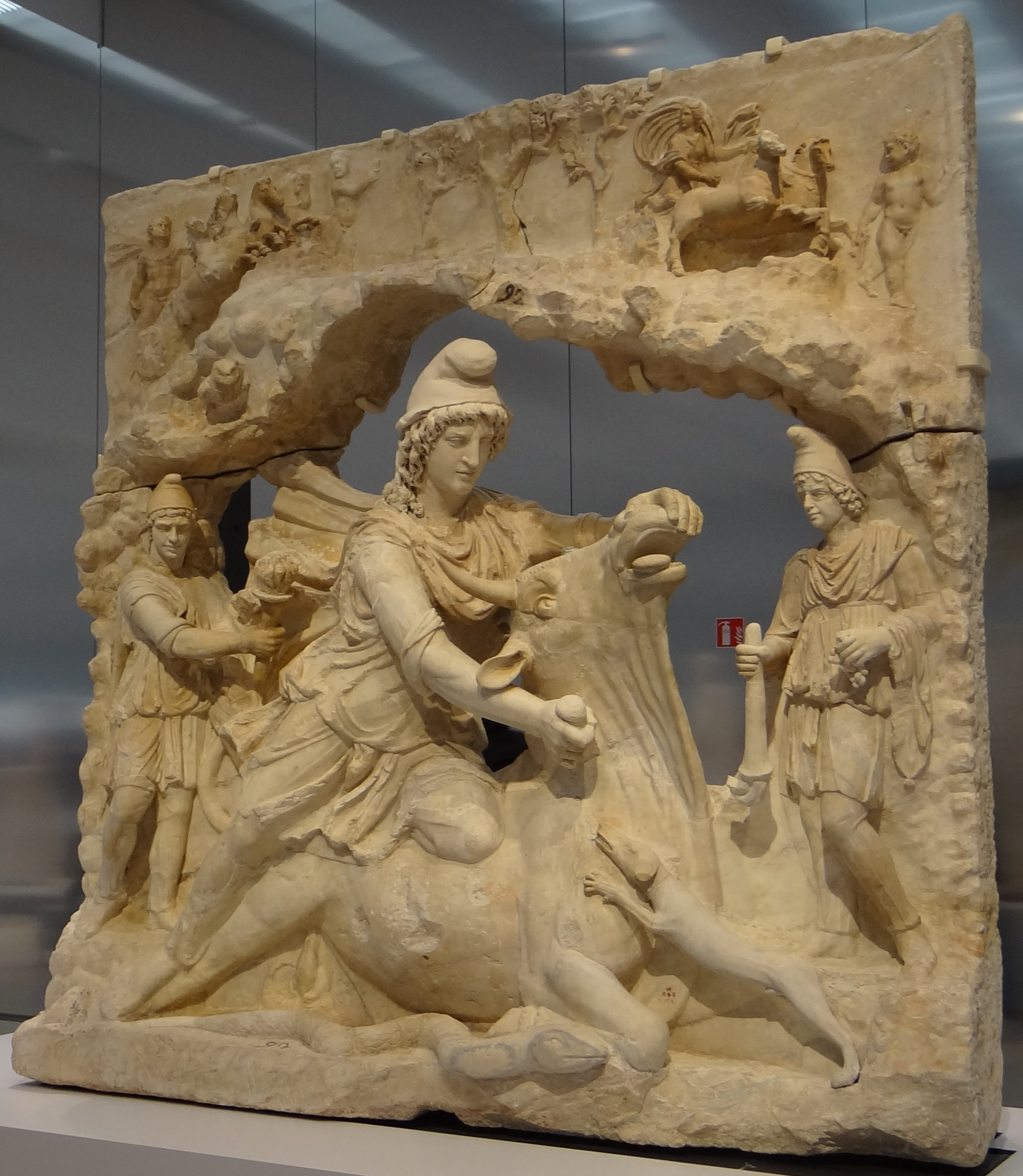
Examples of solar deities from different cultures (from top): Helios, Ra, Amaterasu, Mithra and Tōnatiuh

A solar deity or sun deity is a deity who represents the Sun or an aspect thereof. Such deities are usually associated with power and strength. Solar deities and Sun worship can be found throughout most of recorded history in various forms. The English word sun derives from Proto-Germanic *sunnǭ. The Sun is sometimes referred to by its Latin name Sol or by its Greek name Helios.

== Overview ==
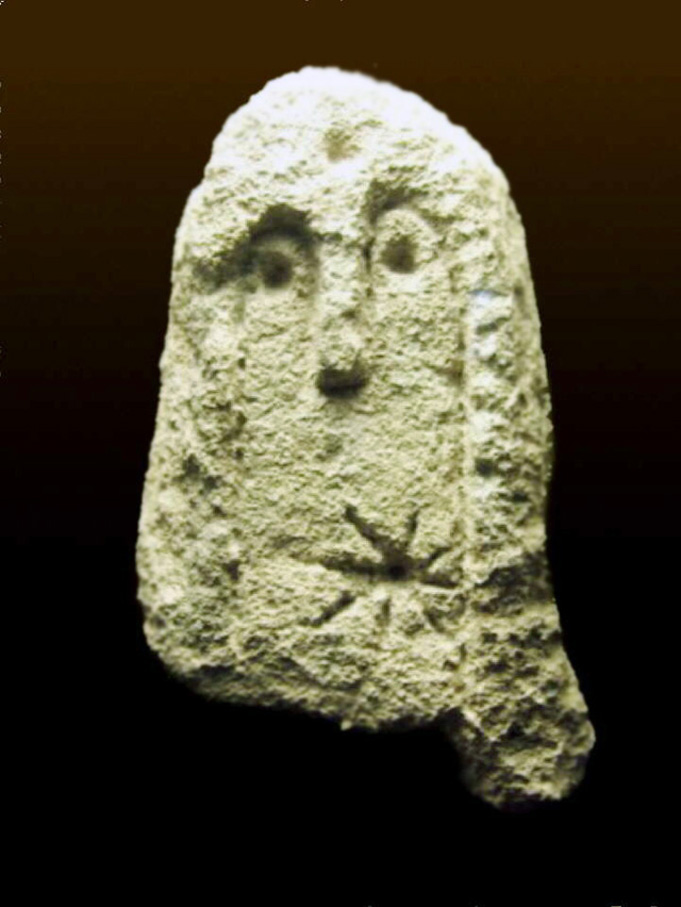
A solar representation on an anthropomorphic stele from Rocher des Doms, France, Chasséen culture, 5th–4th millennia BC

Predynasty Egyptian beliefs attribute Atum as the Sun god and Horus as a god of the sky and Sun. As the Old Kingdom theocracy gained influence, early beliefs were incorporated into the expanding popularity of Ra and the Osiris-Horus mythology. Atum became Ra-Atum, the rays of the setting Sun. Osiris became the divine heir to Atum's power on Earth and passed his divine authority to his son, Horus. Other early Egyptian myths imply that the Sun is incorporated with the lioness Sekhmet at night and is reflected in her eyes; or that the Sun is found within the cow Hathor during the night and reborn each morning as her son (bull).

Mesopotamian Shamash played an important role during the Bronze Age, and "my Sun" was eventually used to address royalty. Similarly, South American cultures have a tradition of Sun worship as with the Incan Inti.

In Germanic mythology, the solar deity is Sol; in Vedic, Surya; and in Greek, Helios (occasionally referred to as Titan) and (sometimes) as Apollo. In Proto-Indo-European mythology the sun appears to be a multilayered figure manifested as a deity but also perceived as the eye of the sky father Dyeus.

=== Solar myth ===
Three theories exercised great influence on nineteenth and early twentieth century mythography. The theories were the "solar mythology" of Alvin Boyd Kuhn and Max Müller, the tree worship of Mannhardt, and the totemism of J. F. McLennan.

Müller's "solar mythology" was born from the study of Indo-European languages. Of them, Müller believed Archaic Sanskrit was the closest to the language spoken by the Aryans. Using the Sanskrit names for deities as a base, he applied Grimm's law to names for similar deities from different Indo-European groups to compare their etymological relationships to one another. In the comparison, Müller saw the similarities between the names and used these etymological similarities to explain the similarities between their roles as deities. Through the study, Müller concluded that the Sun having many different names led to the creation of multiple solar deities and their mythologies that were passed down from one group to another.

R. F. Littledale criticized the Sun myth theory, pointing out that by his own principles, Max Müller was himself only a solar myth. Alfred Lyall delivered another attack on the same theory's assumption that tribal gods and heroes, such as those of Homer, were only reflections of the Sun myth by proving that the gods of certain Rajput clans were actual warriors who founded the clans a few centuries ago, and were the ancestors of the present chieftains.

=== Solar vessels and chariots ===
==== Solar boats ====
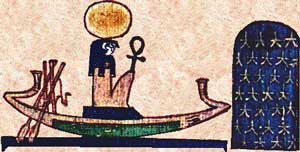
Ra in his barque

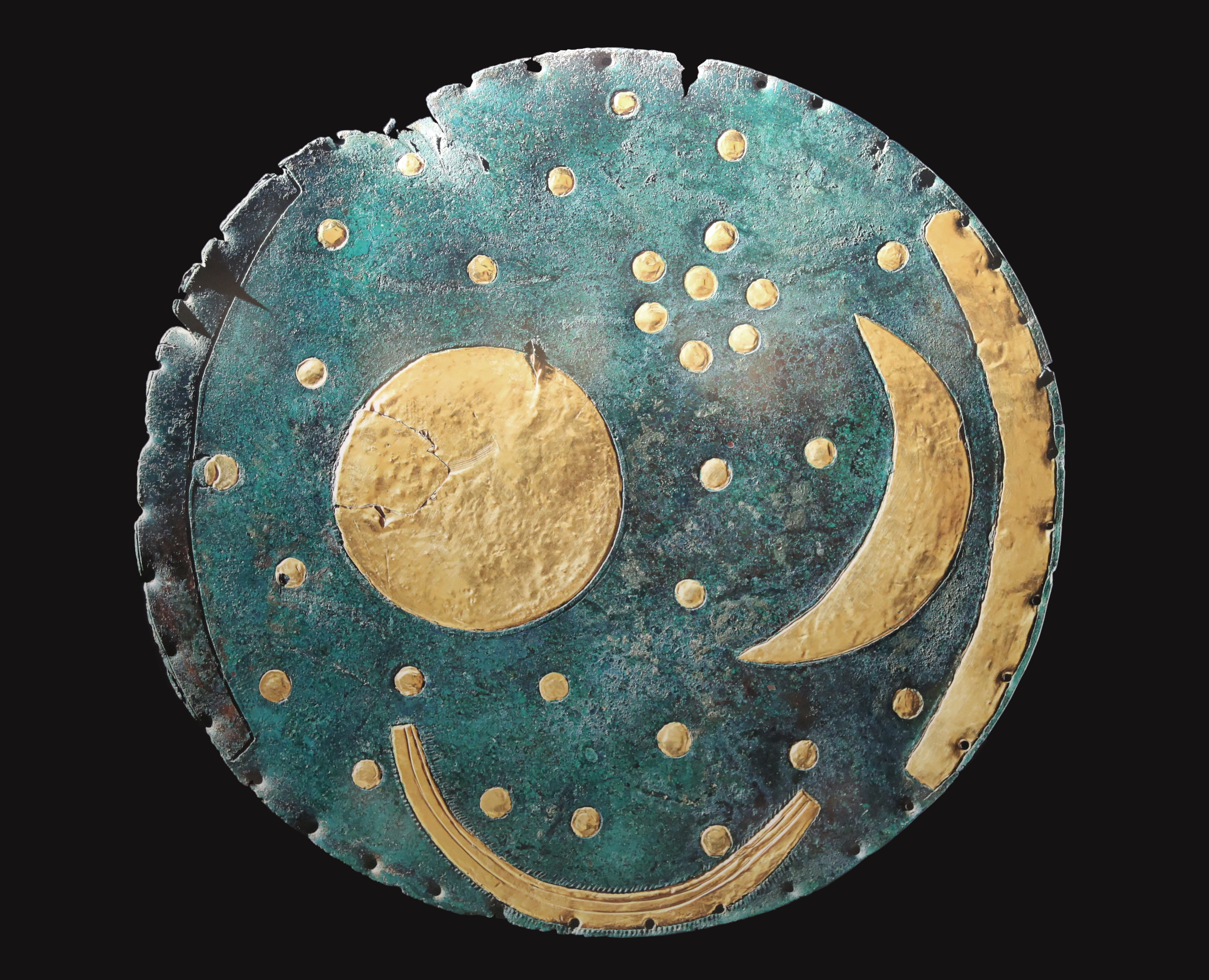
The Nebra Sky Disc, Germany, c. 1800–1600 BC

The Sun was sometimes envisioned as traveling through the sky in a boat. A prominent example is the solar barque used by Ra in ancient Egyptian mythology. The Neolithic concept of a "solar barge" (also "solar bark", "solar barque", "solar boat" and "sun boat", a mythological representation of the Sun riding in a boat) is found in the later myths of ancient Egypt, with Ra and Horus. Several Egyptian kings were buried with ships that may have been intended to symbolize the solar barque, including the Khufu ship that was buried at the foot of the Great Pyramid of Giza.

Solar boats and similar vessels also appear in Indo-European mythologies, such as a 'hundred-oared ship' of Surya in the Rig Veda, the golden boat of Saulė in Baltic mythology, and the golden bowl of Helios in Greek mythology. Numerous depictions of solar boats are known from the Bronze Age in Europe. Possible solar boat depictions have also been identified in Neolithic petroglyphs from the Megalithic culture in western Europe, and in Mesolithic petroglyphs from northern Europe.

Examples of solar vessels include:

- Neolithic petroglyphs which are interpreted as depicting solar barges.
- The many early Egyptian goddesses that were seen as sun deities, and the later gods Ra and Horus were depicted as riding in a solar barge. In Egyptian myths of the afterlife, Ra rides in an underground channel from west to east every night so that he can rise in the east the next morning.
- The Nebra sky disk, c. 1800–1600 BC, associated with the Unetice culture, which is thought to show a depiction of a gold solar boat.
- Gold lunulae associated with the Bell Beaker culture, c. 2400–2000 BC, thought to represent solar boats.
- Nordic Bronze Age petroglyphs, including those found in Tanumshede, often contain barges and sun crosses in different constellations. Solar boat imagery also appears on bronze razors from the period.
- Miniature gold boats from Nors in Denmark, dating from the Nordic Bronze Age.
- The Caergwrle Bowl from Wales, dating from the British Bronze Age, c. 1300 BC.
- Solar boat motifs depicted on bronze artefacts from the Urnfield culture and Lusatian culture, c. 1300–500 BC.
- Depictions of solar boats on Iron Age Celtic artefacts, such as the Petrie Crown from Ireland (1st century AD), and ornaments on the Vix grave wagon from France (500 BC).

===== Gallery =====
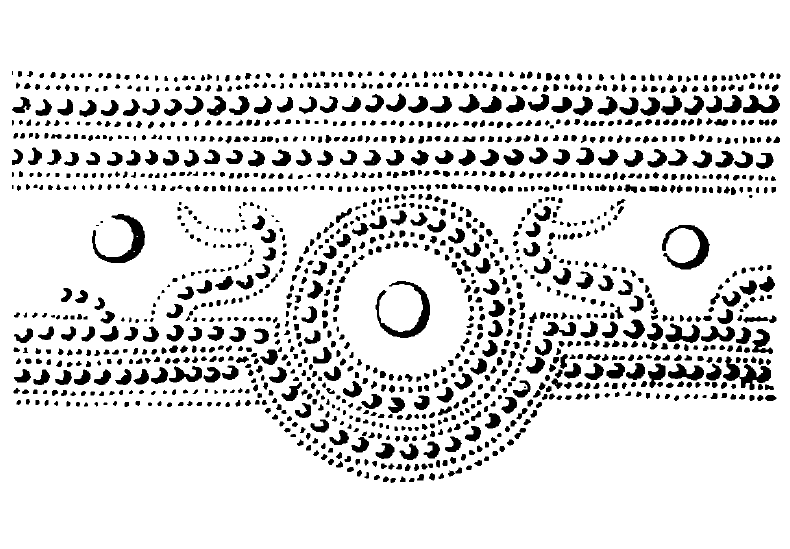
The 'sun-bird-boat' motif often found on Urnfield culture artefacts

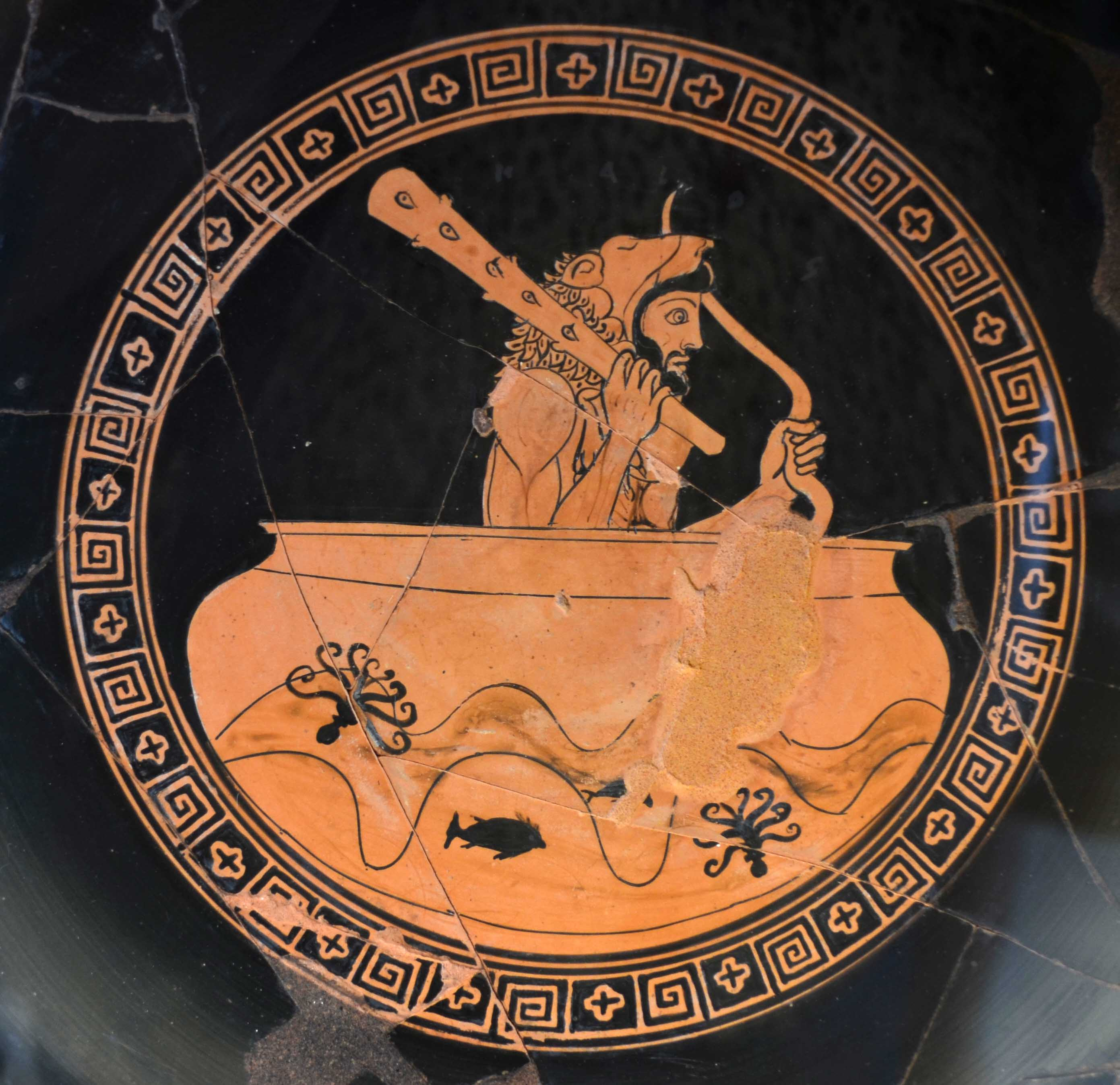
Heracles in the golden cup-boat of the sun god Helios, 480 BC

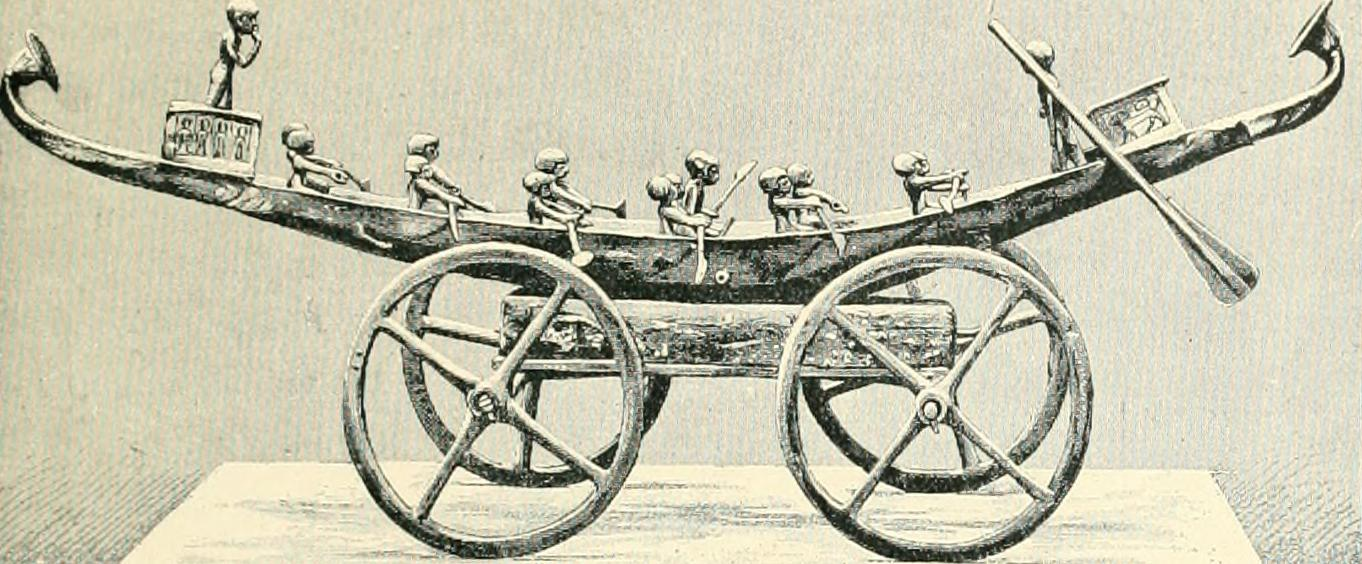
Gold boat model mounted on chariot wheels, from the tomb of Queen Ahhotep, c. 1550 BC

==== Solar chariots ====
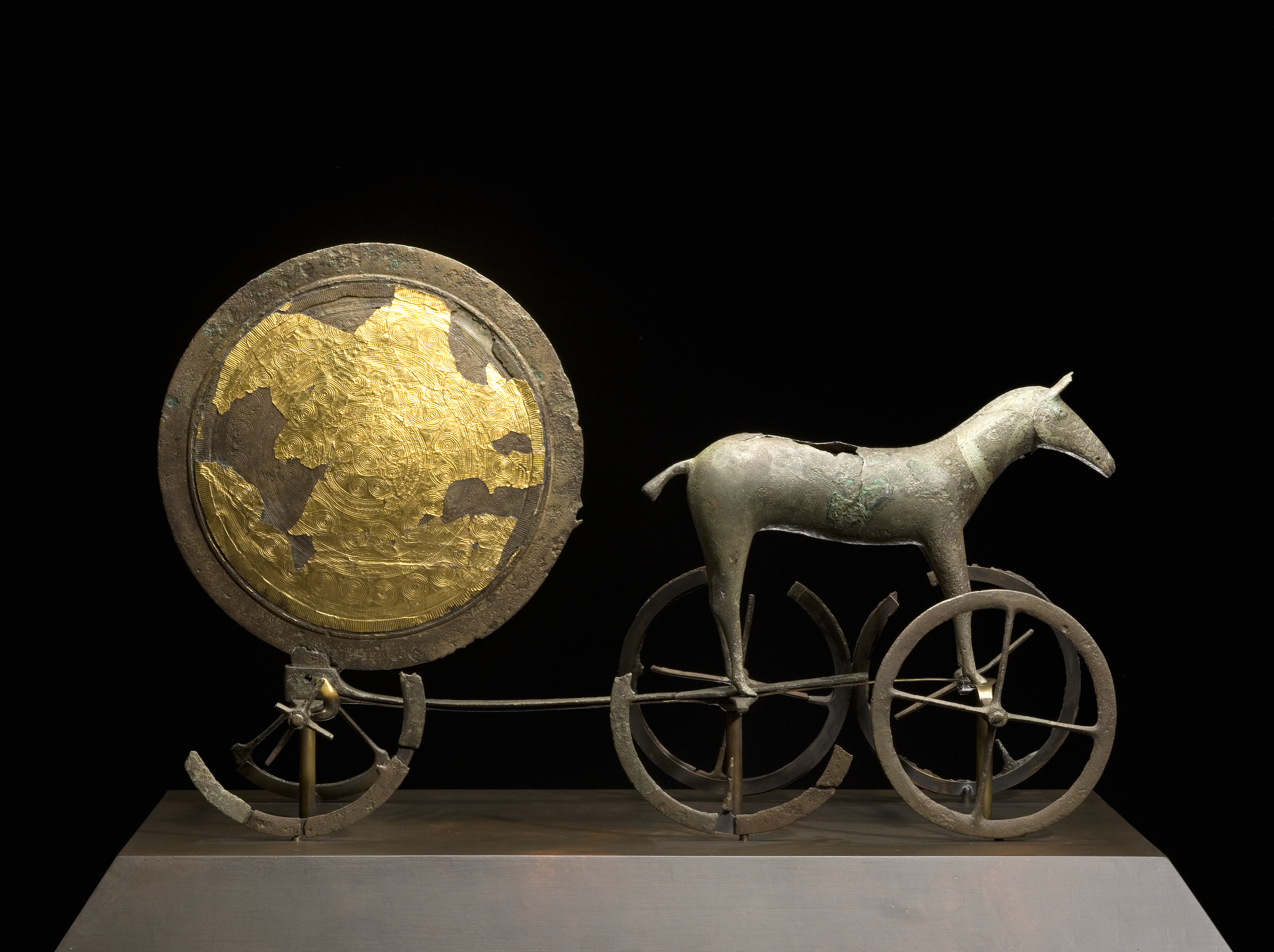
The Trundholm sun chariot, Denmark, c. 1500–1300 BC

The concept of the "solar chariot" is younger than that of the solar barge and is typically Indo-European, corresponding with the Indo-European expansion after the invention of the chariot in the 2nd millennium BC. The reconstruction of the Proto-Indo-European religion features a "solar chariot" or "sun chariot" with which the Sun traverses the sky.

Chariots were introduced to Egypt in the Hyksos period, and were seen as solar vehicles associated with the sun god in the subsequent New Kingdom period. A gold solar boat model from the tomb of Queen Ahhotep, dating from the beginning of the New Kingdom (c. 1550 BC), was mounted on four-spoked chariot wheels. Similarities have been noted with the Trundholm Sun Chariot from Denmark, dating from c. 1500–1400 BC, which was also mounted on four-spoked wheels.

Examples of solar chariots include:

- In Norse mythology, the chariot of the goddess Sól, drawn by Árvakr and Alsviðr ('early awake' and 'all-swift'). The Trundholm sun chariot dates to the Nordic Bronze Age, about 2,500 years earlier than written attestations of the Norse myth, but is often associated with it.
- Greek Helios (or Apollo) riding in a chariot. (See also Phaëton)
- Sol Invictus depicted riding a quadriga on the reverse of a Roman coin.
- Hindu Surya riding in a chariot drawn by seven horses.

In Chinese culture, the sun chariot is associated with the passage of time. For instance, in the poem Suffering from the Shortness of Days, Li He of the Tang dynasty is hostile towards the legendary dragons that drew the sun chariot as a vehicle for the continuous progress of time. The following is an excerpt from the poem:

I will cut off the dragon's feet, chew the dragon's flesh,
so that they can't turn back in the morning or lie down at night.
Left to themselves the old won't die; the young won't cry.

=== Gender ===
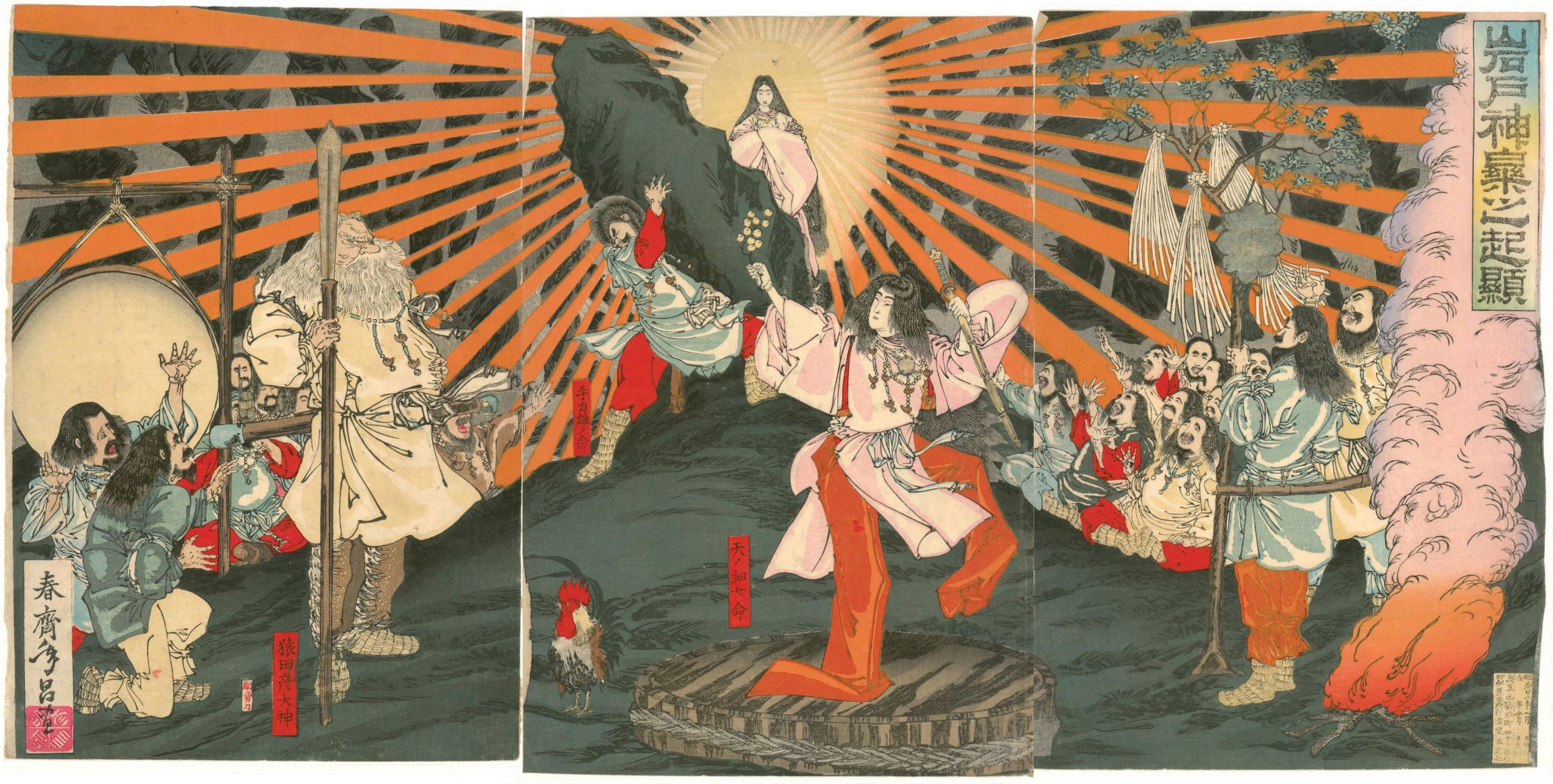
Goddess Amaterasu

Solar deities are often thought of as male (and lunar deities as being female) but the opposite has also been the case. In Germanic mythology, the Sun is female, and the Moon is male. Other European cultures that have sun goddesses include the Lithuanians (Saulė) and Latvians (Saule), the Finns (Päivätär, Beiwe) and the related Hungarians. Sun goddesses are found around the world in Australia (Bila, Wala); in Indian tribal religions (Bisal-Mariamma, Bomong, 'Ka Sgni) and Sri Lanka (Pattini); among the Hittites (Wurusemu), Berbers (Tafukt), Egyptians (Hathor, Sekhmet), and Canaanites (Shapash); in the Canary Islands (Chaxiraxi, Magec); in Native America, among the Cherokee (Unelanuhi), Natchez (Oüa Chill/Uwahci∙ł), Inuit (Siqiniq), and Miwok (He'-koo-lās); and in Asia among the Japanese (Amaterasu).

The cobra (of Pharaoh, son of Ra), the lioness (daughter of Ra), and the cow (daughter of Ra), are the dominant symbols of the most ancient Egyptian deities. They were female and carried their relationship to the sun atop their heads, and their cults remained active throughout the history of the culture. Later another sun god (Aten) was established in the eighteenth dynasty on top of the other solar deities, before the "aberration" was stamped out and the old pantheon re-established. When male deities became associated with the sun in that culture, they began as the offspring of a mother (except Ra, King of the Gods who gave birth to himself).

== Africa ==
=== Ancient Egypt ===
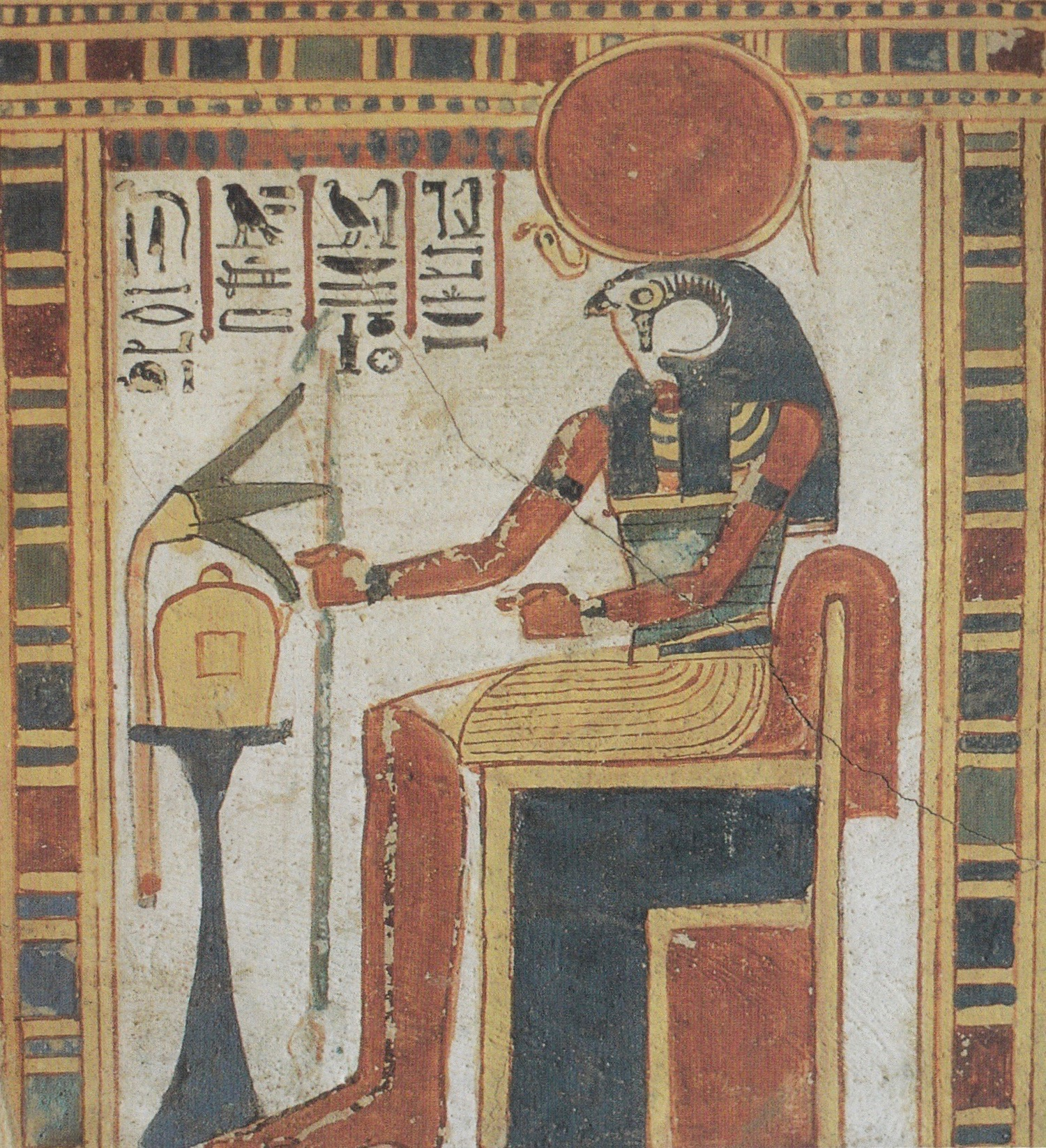
Ra Enthroned in the Tomb of Roy

Sun worship was prevalent in ancient Egyptian religion. From at least the 4th Dynasty of ancient Egypt, the Sun was worshiped as the deity Ra (meaning simply 'the sun'), and portrayed as a falcon-headed god surmounted by the solar disk, and surrounded by a serpent. Ra supposedly gave warmth to the living body, symbolized as an ankh: a "☥" shaped amulet with a looped upper half. The ankh, it was believed, was surrendered with death, but could be preserved in the corpse with appropriate mummification and funerary rites. The supremacy of Ra in the Egyptian pantheon was at its highest with the Fifth Dynasty, when open-air solar temples became common.

In the Middle Kingdom of Egypt, Ra lost some of his preeminence to Osiris, lord of the west, and judge of the dead. In the New Empire period, the Sun became identified with the dung beetle, whose spherical ball of dung was identified with the Sun. In the form of the sun disc Aten, the Sun had a brief resurgence during the Amarna Period when it again became the preeminent, if not only, divinity for the pharaoh, Akhenaten.

The Sun's movement across the sky represents a struggle between the pharaoh's soul and an avatar of Osiris. Ra travels across the sky in his solar-boat; at dawn he drives away the god of chaos, Apep. The "solarisation" of several local gods (Khnum-Ra, Min-Ra, Amun-Ra) reached its peak in the period of the Fifth Dynasty.

N27
Akhet (horizon)
in hieroglyphs

Aker guarding the horizon

Rituals to the god Amun, who became identified with the sun god Ra, were often carried out on the top of temple pylons. A pylon mirrored the hieroglyph for 'horizon' or akhet, which was a depiction of two hills "between which the sun rose and set", associated with recreation and rebirth. On the first pylon of the temple of Isis at Philae, the pharaoh is shown slaying his enemies in the presence of Isis, Horus, and Hathor.

In the Eighteenth Dynasty, the earliest-known monotheistic head of state, Akhenaten, changed the polytheistic religion of Egypt to a monotheistic one, Atenism. All other deities were replaced by the Aten, including Amun-Ra, the reigning sun god of Akhenaten's own region. Unlike other deities, Aten did not have multiple forms. His only image was a disk—a symbol of the Sun.

Soon after Akhenaten's death, worship of the traditional deities was reestablished by the religious leaders (Ay the High-Priest of Amun-Ra, mentor of Tutankhaten/Tutankhamen) who had adopted the Aten during the reign of Akhenaten.

=== Kongo ===
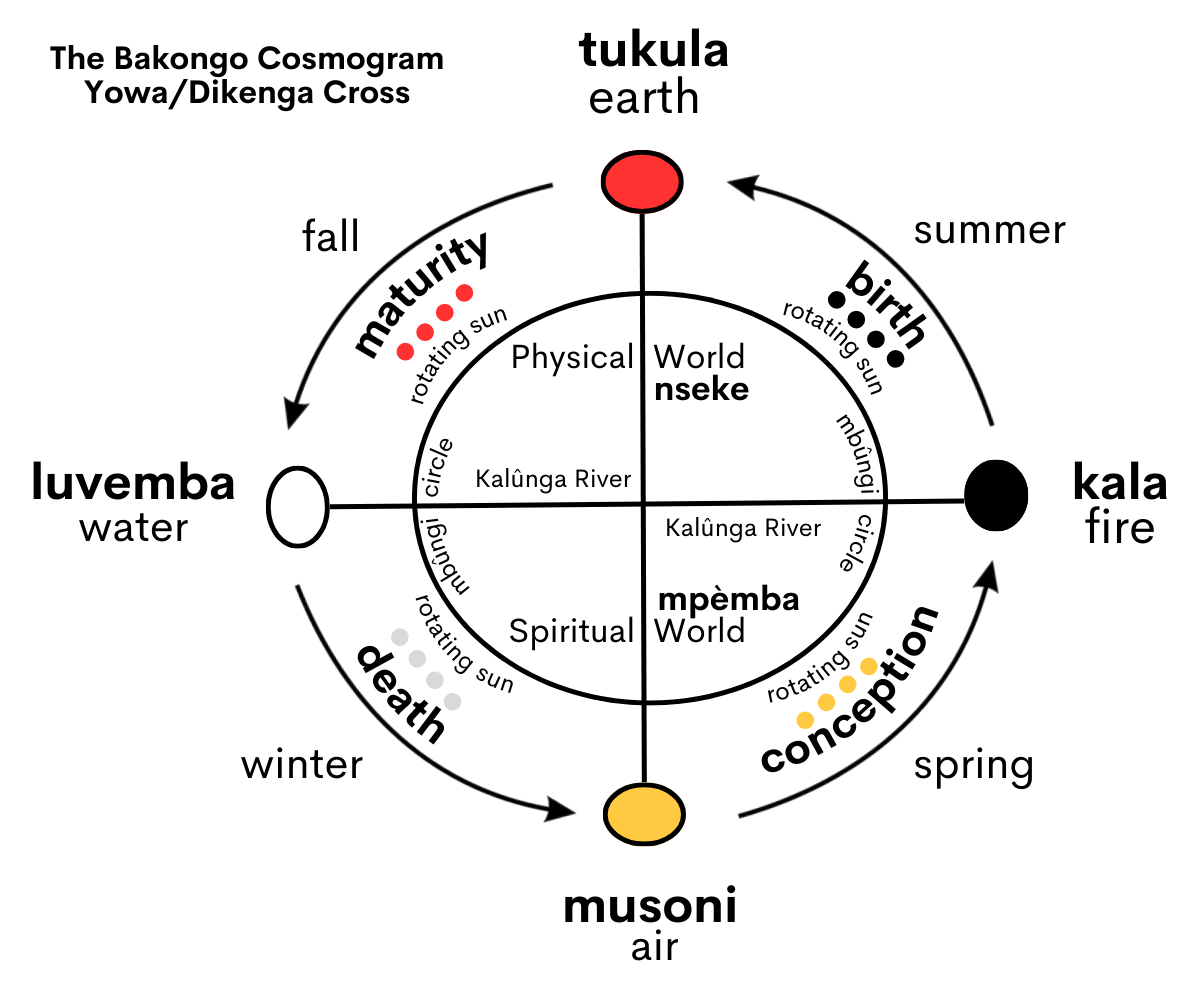
The Kongo Cosmogram

In Kongo religion, Nzambi Mpungu is the Sky Father and god of the Sun, while that his female counterpart, Nzambici, is Sky Mother and the god of the Moon and Earth. The Sun is very significant to Bakongo people, who believe that the position of the sun marks the different seasons of a Kongo person's life as they transition between the four moments of life: conception (musoni), birth (kala), maturity (tukula), and death (luvemba). The Kongo cosmogram, a sacred symbol in Bakongo culture, depicts these moments of the sun.

=== Kalenjin ===
Kalenjin mythology was based upon the belief in a supreme god, Asis or Cheptalel, represented in the form of the sun (asista), although the sun itself was not considered to be God. He lives in the sky and is supreme, omnipotent, and the guarantor of right. Among the Northern sections of the Kalenjin he is also commonly referred to as Tororut. Beneath Asis is Elat, who controls thunder and lightning.

=== Akan ===
In Akan mythology, Nyame is the creator of all things, including the sun. One of Nyame's titles is Amowia, meaning giver/creator of the sun. Awia, also spelt Owia, was the personification of the sun, an ewim abosom, older twin brother of Osrane (moon), and brother of Esum (darkness). Due to the climate of Ghana, the Akan tribes viewed the sun as both capable of great heat and droughts and life—giving light that causes plant growth. Under his light, disputes were settled.

== Americas ==
=== Aztec mythology ===
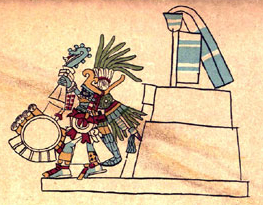
Huitzilopochtli, the Aztec god of the sun and war

In Aztec mythology, Tonatiuh (Nahuatl languages: Ollin Tonatiuh, "Movement of the Sun") was the sun god. The Aztec people considered him the leader of Tollan (heaven). He was also known as the fifth sun, because the Aztecs believed that he was the sun that took over when the fourth sun was expelled from the sky. According to their cosmology, each sun was a god with its own cosmic era. According to the Aztecs, they were still in Tonatiuh's era. According to the Aztec creation myth, the god demanded human sacrifice as tribute and without it would refuse to move through the sky. The Aztecs were fascinated by the Sun and carefully observed it, and had a solar calendar similar to that of the Maya. Many of today's remaining Aztec monuments have structures aligned with the Sun.

In the Aztec calendar, Tonatiuh is the lord of the thirteen days from 1 Death to 13 Flint. The preceding thirteen days are ruled over by Chalchiuhtlicue, and the following thirteen by Tlaloc.

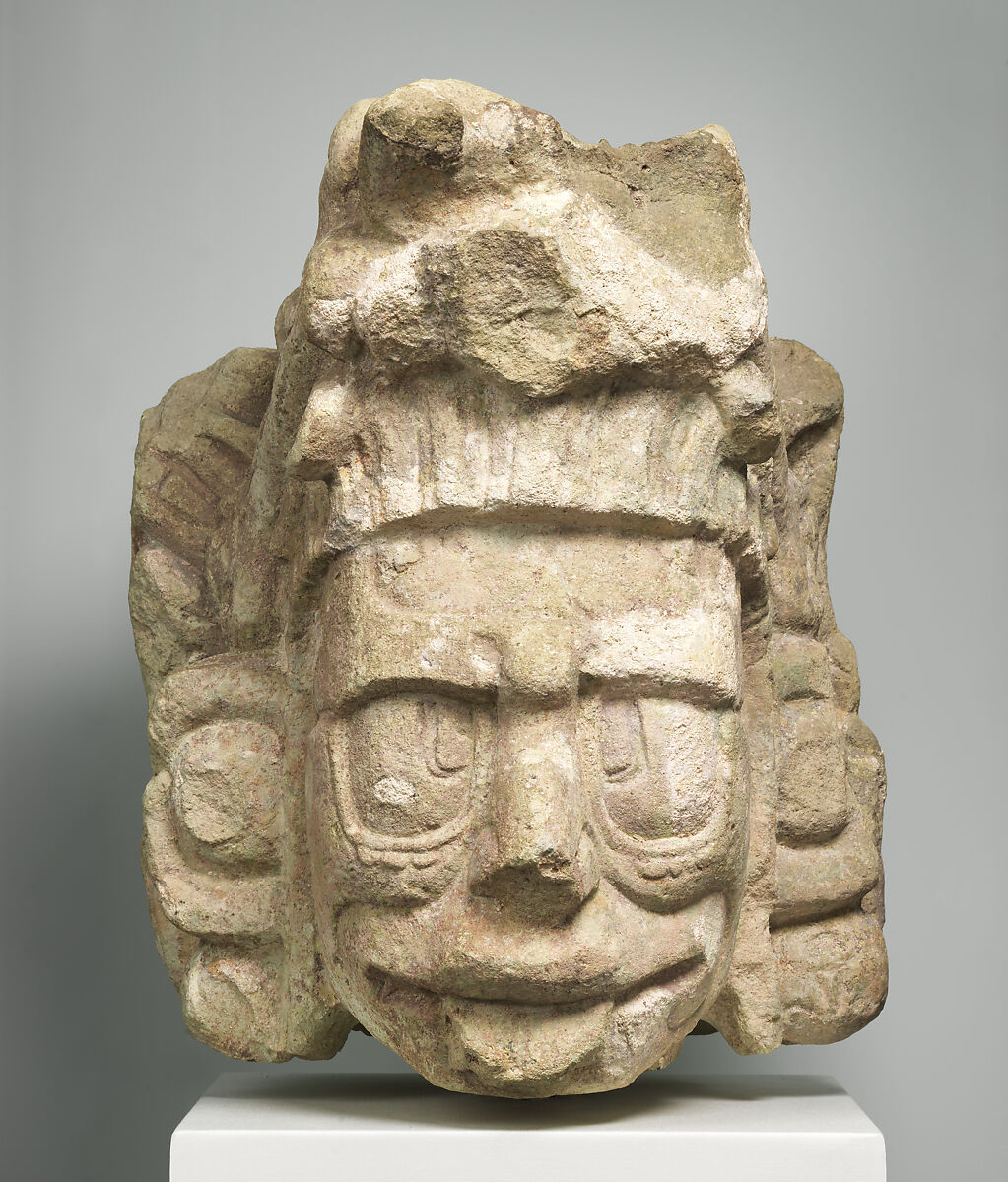
Head of K'inich Ahau

=== Maya mythology ===
K'inich Ahau is Maya god of the Sun. He attested to by Bishop Diego de Landa in the 16th century and also in sculptural and ceramic form from the Classic period. He often appears as a younger deity with striking square shaped eyes and the glyph for sun infixed onto his body.

=== Navajo mythology ===
Tsohanoai is the Navajo sun god, who carries the sun on his back during the day, and hangs it on a peg on the West wall of his house at night.

=== Incan mythology ===
Inti is the ancient Incan sun god. He is revered as the national patron of the Inca state. Although most consider Inti the sun god, he is more appropriately viewed as a cluster of solar aspects, since the Inca divided his identity according to the stages of the sun. Inti is represented as a golden disk with rays and a human face.

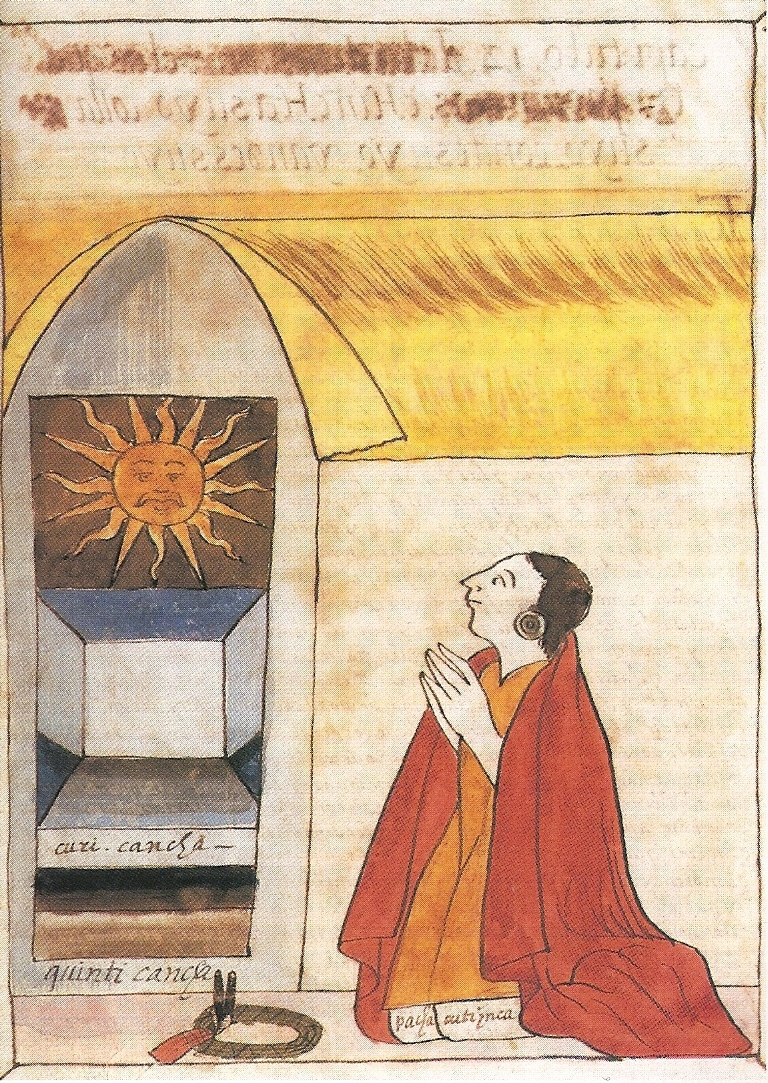
The Emperor Pachacútec worshiping Inti in the temple Coricancha, drawing by Martín de Murúa of 1613

The Inca dedicated many ceremonies to the Sun in order to ensure the Sapa Inca's welfare. The Incas would set aside large quantities of natural and human resources throughout the empire for Inti. Each conquered province was supposed to dedicate a third of their lands and herds to Inti as mandated by the Inca. Each major province would also have a Sun Temple in which male and female priests would serve.

== Asia ==
=== Armenian mythology ===
In Armenian mythology and in the vicinity of Carahunge, the ancient site of interest in the field of archaeoastronomy, people worshiped a powerful deity or intelligence called Ara, embodied as the sun (Ar or Arev). The ancient Armenians called themselves "children of the sun". (Russian and Armenian archaeoastronomers have suggested that at Carahunge seventeen of the stones still standing were associated with observations of sunrise or sunset at the solstices and equinoxes.)

=== Chinese mythology ===
Sun and Immortal Birds Gold Ornament by ancient Shu people. The center is a sun pattern with twelve points around which four birds fly in the same counterclockwise direction, Shang dynasty.

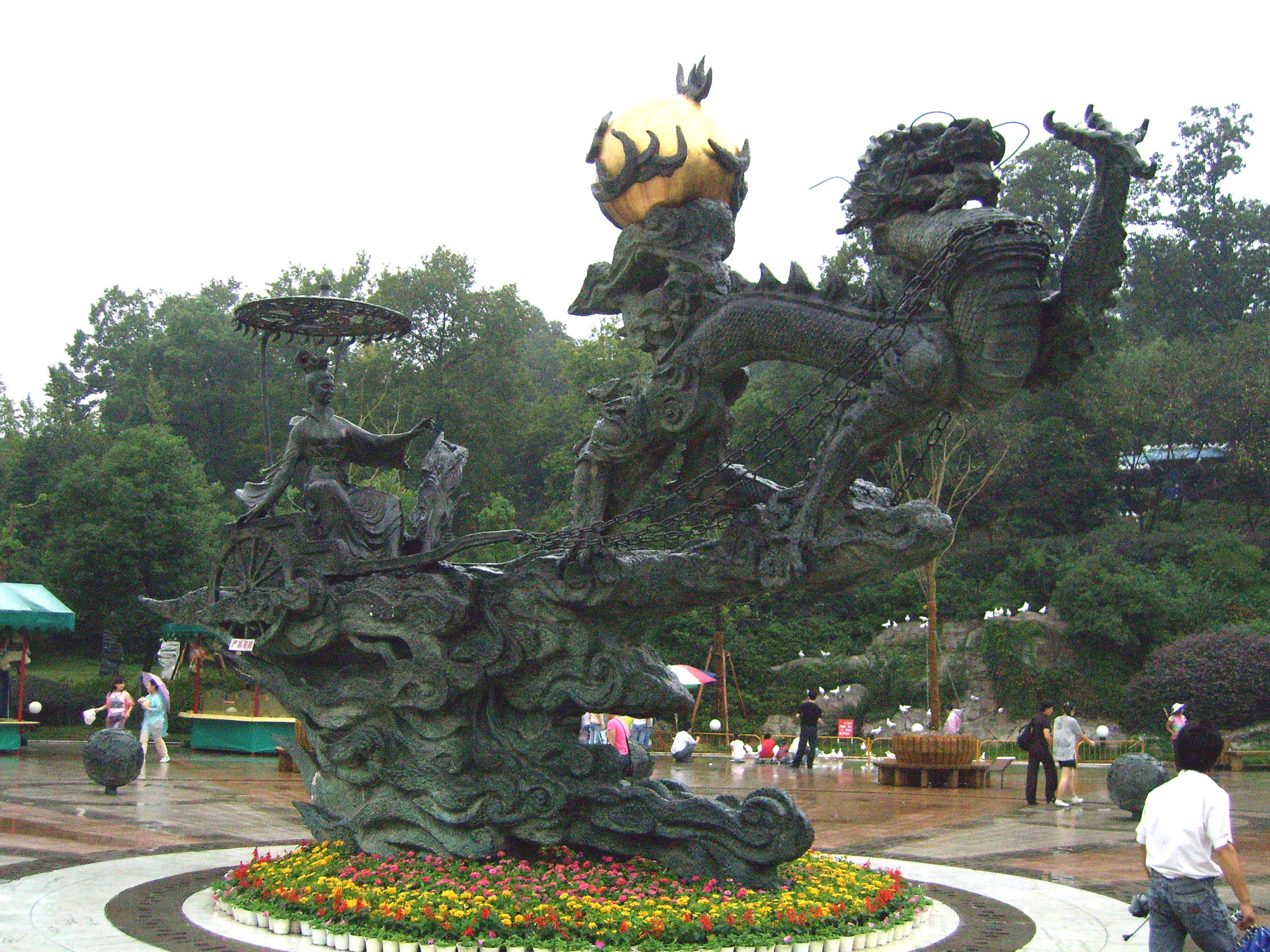
Statue of the sun goddess Xihe charioteering the sun, being pulled by a dragon, in Hangzhou

Chinese mythology features multiple sun gods, including Shang Jia, a Predynastic Shang ruler-turned-deity, and Xihe, the sun goddess who governs time, and her ten sun sons born to her, and Di Jun, one of the highest deities. These ten suns can transform into a three-legged crow. There is also Dongjun, the sun and moon god who governs spring and the east, and the Tai Yang Xing Jun, who governs the celestial body itself, the Sun.

In Chinese mythology (cosmology), there were originally ten suns in the sky, who were all brothers. They were supposed to emerge one at a time as commanded by the Di Jun. They were all very young and loved to fool around. Once they decided to all go into the sky to play, all at once. This made the world too hot for anything to grow. A hero named Hou Yi, honored to this day, shot down nine of them with a bow and arrow to save the people of the Earth.

In another myth, a solar eclipse was said to be caused by a magical dog or dragon biting off a piece of the Sun. The referenced event is said to have occurred around 2136 BC; two royal astronomers, Ho and Hi, were executed for failing to predict the eclipse. There was a tradition in China to make lots of loud celebratory sounds during a solar eclipse to scare the sacred beast away.

The Deity of the Sun in Chinese mythology is Ri Gong Tai Yang Xing Jun (Tai Yang Gong/Grandfather Sun) or Star Lord of the Solar Palace, Lord of the Sun. Tai Yang Xing Jun is usually depicted with the Star Lord of the Lunar Palace, Lord of the Moon, Yue Gong Tai Yin Xing Jun (Tai Yin Niang Niang/Lady Tai Yin).

=== Pre-Islamic Arabia ===
The concept of the sun as a deity in Pre-Islamic Arabia, was abolished only under Muhammad. The Arabian solar deity appears to have been a goddess, Shams/Shamsun, most likely related to the Canaanite Shapash and broader middle-eastern Shamash. She was the patron goddess of Himyar, and possibly exalted by the Sabaeans.

=== Yazidism ===
In Yazidism, the angel Şêşims is venerated as the Xudan or Lord of sun and light. He is also linked with fire, which is his terrestrial counterpart, and oaths, which are sworn by the doorway of his shrine. Annually, during the Feast of the Assembly, a ceremonial bull sacrifice is performed in front of his shrine at Lalish. Yazidi religious texts refer to the light of the sun as a manifestation of God's light, therefore, Yazidis direct their faces in the sun's direction while praying. There are daily Yazidi prayers that are recited during the daytime, divided into three main phases of the day, the morning prayers include "Dua Şifaqê" (the dawn prayer), "Dua Sibê" (the morning prayer), "Duaya Rojhelatî" (the sunrise prayer). For the noon there is "Dua Nîvro" (the noon prayer) and at evening there is the "Duaya Hêvarî" (the evening prayer).

== Europe ==
=== Albanian paganism ===
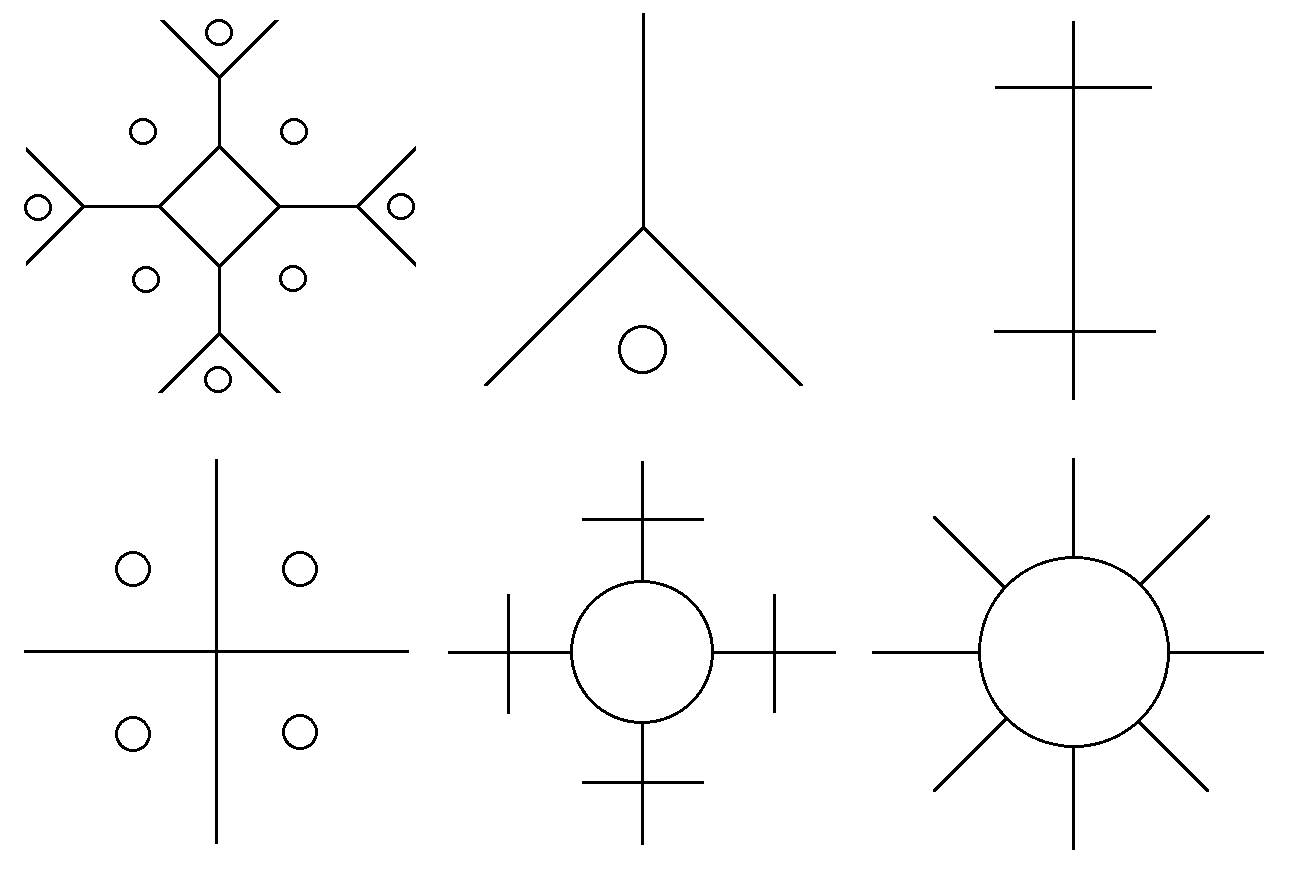
Sun (Dielli) and Fire (Zjarri) symbols in Albanian traditional tattoo patterns (19th century). The cross (also swastika in some tattoos) is the Albanian traditional way to represent the deified Fire—Zjarri, evidently also called with the theonym Enji.

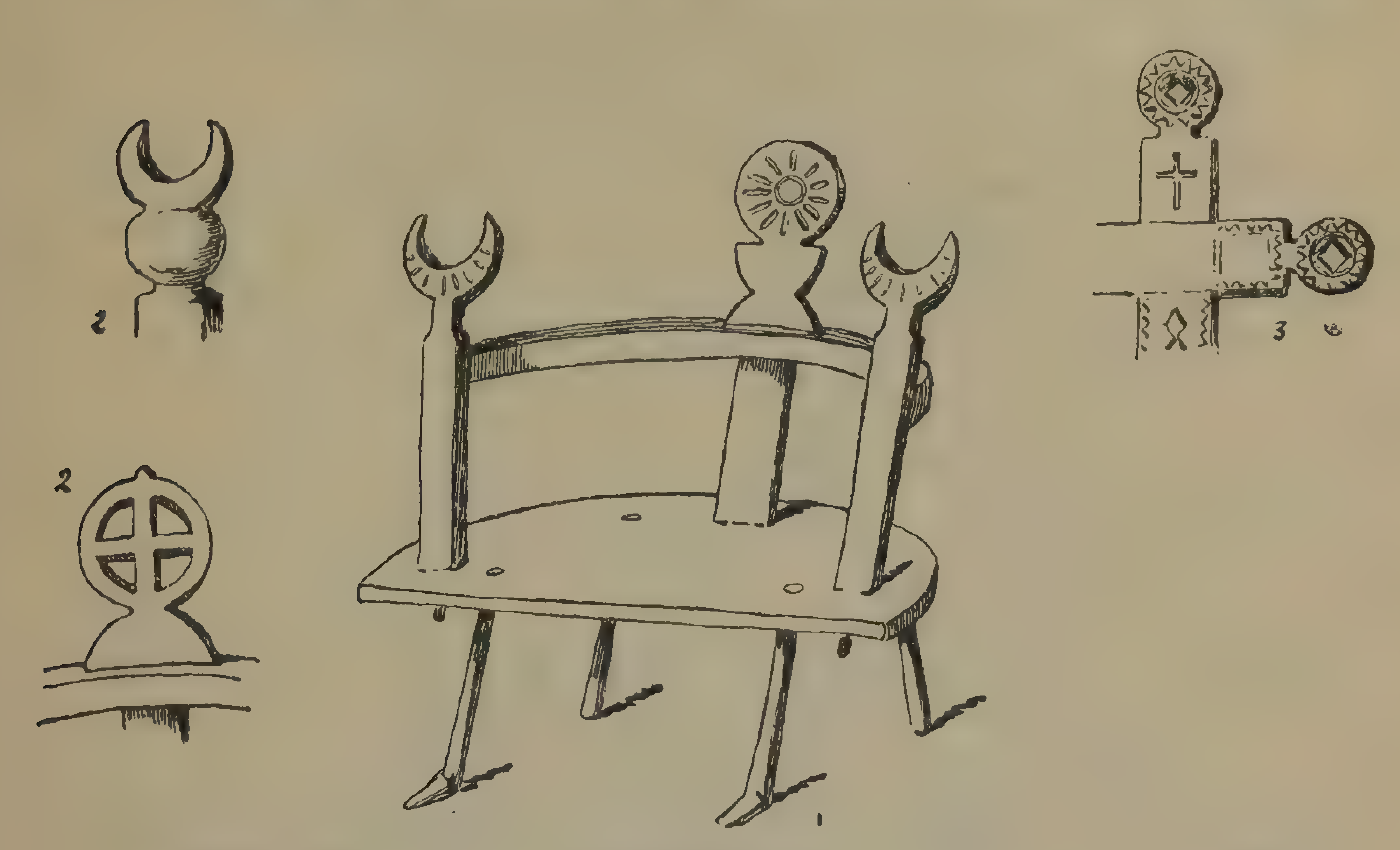
Albanian traditional carving patterns on chairs and graves, drawn by Edith Durham before 1928. They are representations of the Sun (Dielli) and the Moon (Hana), sometimes also rayed, symbolizing their light, which is favored within the dualistic struggle between light and darkness.

The Sun (Albanian: Diell-i) holds the primary role in Albanian pagan customs, beliefs, rituals, myths, and legends. Albanian major traditional festivities and calendar rites are based on the Sun, worshiped as the god of light, sky and weather, giver of life, health and energy, and all-seeing eye. In Albanian tradition the fire—zjarri, evidently also called with the theonym Enji—worship and rituals are particularly related to the cult of the Sun. Ritual calendar fires or bonfires are traditionally kindled before sunrise in order to give strength to the Sun and to ward off evil. Many rituals are practiced before and during sunrise, honoring this moment of the day as it is believed to give energy and health to the body. As the wide set of cultic traditions dedicated to him indicates, the Albanian Sun-god appears to be an expression of the Proto-Indo-European Sky-god (Zot or Zojz in Albanian).

Albanians were firstly described in written sources as worshippers of the Sun and the Moon by German humanist Sebastian Franck in 1534, but the Sun and the Moon have been preserved as sacred elements of Albanian tradition since antiquity. Illyrian material culture shows that the Sun was the chief cult object of the Illyrian religion. Finding correspondences with Albanian folk beliefs and practices, the Illyrian Sun-deity is figuratively represented on Iron Age plaques from Lake Shkodra as the god of the sky and lightning, also associated with the fire altar where he throws lightning bolts. The symbolization of the cult of the Sun, which is often combined with the crescent Moon, is commonly found in a variety of contexts of Albanian folk art, including traditional tattooing, grave art, jewellery, embroidery, and house carvings. Solemn oaths (Besa), good omens, and curse formulas, involve and are addressed to, or taken by, the Sun. Prayers to the Sun, ritual bonfires, and animal sacrifices have been common practices performed by Albanians during the ritual pilgrimages on mountain tops.

In Albanian pagan beliefs and mythology the Sun is a personified male deity, and the Moon (Hëna) is his female counterpart. In pagan beliefs the fire hearth (vatra e zjarrit) is the symbol of fire as the offspring of the Sun. In some folk tales, myths and legends the Sun and the Moon are regarded as husband and wife, also appearing as the parents of E Bija e Hënës dhe e Diellit ("the Daughter of the Moon and the Sun"); in others the Sun and the Moon are regarded as brother and sister, but in this case they are never considered consorts. Nëna e Diellit ("the Mother of the Sun" or "the Sun's Mother") also appears as a personified deity in Albanian folk beliefs and tales.

Albanian beliefs, myths and legends are organized around the dualistic struggle between good and evil, light and darkness, which cyclically produces the cosmic renewal. The most famous representation of it is the constant battle between drangue and kulshedra, which is seen as a mythological extension of the cult of the Sun and the Moon, widely observed in Albanian traditional art. In Albanian traditions, kulshedra is also fought by the Daughter of the Moon and the Sun, who uses her light power against pride and evil, or by other heroic characters marked in their bodies by the symbols of celestial objects, such as Zjermi (lit. 'the Fire'), who notably is born with the Sun on his forehead.

=== Baltic mythology ===
Those who practice Dievturība, beliefs of traditional Latvian culture, worship the Sun goddess Saule, known in traditional Lithuanian beliefs as Saulė. Saule is among the most important deities in Baltic mythology and traditions.

=== Celtic mythology ===
The sun in Insular Celtic culture is assumed to have been feminine, and several goddesses have been proposed as possibly solar in character. In Continental Celtic culture, the sun gods, like Belenus, Grannus, and Lugus, were masculine.

In Irish, the name of the Sun, Grian, is feminine. The figure known as Áine is generally assumed to have been either synonymous with her, or her sister, assuming the role of Summer Sun while Grian was the Winter Sun. Similarly, Étaín has at times been considered to be another theonym associated with the Sun; if this is the case, then the pan-Celtic Epona might also have been originally solar in nature.

The British Sulis has a name cognate with that of other Indo-European solar deities such as the Greek Helios and Indic Surya, and bears some solar traits like the association with the eye as well as epithets associated with light. The theonym Sulevia, which is more widespread and probably unrelated to Sulis, is sometimes taken to have suggested a pan-Celtic role as a solar goddess.

The Welsh Olwen has at times been considered a vestige of the local sun goddess, in part due to the possible etymological association with the wheel and the colors gold, white and red.

Brighid has at times been argued as having had a solar nature, fitting her role as a goddess of fire and light.

=== Germanic mythology ===
In Germanic mythology the Sun is personified as a woman, Old Norse Sól, Old High German Sunna. In the Norse tradition, the Sun is driven through the sky on a chariot pulled by two horses named Árvakr and Alsviðr ("Early-awake" and "All-swift").

First century historian Tacitus, in his book Germania, mentioned that "beyond the Suiones [tribe]" a sea was located where the sun maintained its brilliance from its rising to its sunset, and that "[the] popular belief" was that "the sound of its emergence was audible" and "the form of its horses visible".

In Norway, Sun worship was common until the last century, usually as a simple ritual of leaving butter in a saucer on a windowsill, so the Sun can melt it, when its light comes into the window. Alternatively, the glass on the window itself could be smeared by butter, or the butter could be put on the roof or wall. Similar rituals are attested among the Sami people. Usually, the ritual was connected to the day, when the sun shows up from horizon or mountain (or in the eastern window of the main house of the farm) after the period of polar night, when there is no sun at all, or the sun is so low, that it is hidden behind mountains. Because of these reasons, the date of the ritual varied from farm to farm, or was not practiced at all (e.g. in Oslo area, which is flat and has no real polar night).

A ritual of greeting the first sun after the polar night while standing on top of a mountain is mentioned by Procopius in his description of the Northerners, but is also attested in modern time in area of Glomfjord, and a similar one in southern Vest-Agder. Another ritual is known from southern Vest-Agder, when small round stones are supposed to be taken up to a mountain top and put in a heap as an offering to the Spring Sun. The stone offering heaps itself are very common in Scandinavia, but only in Vest-Agder they are connected to the Sun worship.

Among famous people, who were practicing the butter-in-saucer ritual were poets Ivar Mortensson-Egnund and Astrid Krog Halse.

=== Greco-Roman world ===
==== Hellenistic mythology ====
In Greek mythology, Helios, a Titan, was the personification of the Sun; however, with the notable exception of the island of Rhodes and nearby parts of southwestern Anatolia, (Note: see Colossus of Rhodes.) he was a relatively minor deity. The Ancient Greeks also associated the Sun with Apollo, the god of enlightenment, and Hyperion, father of Helios.

The Greek astronomer Thales of Miletus described the scientific properties of the Sun and Moon, making their godship unnecessary. Anaxagoras was arrested in 434 BC and banished from Athens for denying the existence of a solar or lunar deity. The titular character of Sophocles' Electra refers to the Sun as "All-seeing". Hermetic author Hermes Trismegistus calls the Sun "God Visible".

The Minotaur has been interpreted as a solar deity (as Moloch or Chronos), including by Arthur Bernard Cook, who considers both Minos and Minotaur as aspects of the sun god of the Cretans, who depicted the sun as a bull.

==== Roman mythology ====
During the Roman Empire, a festival of the birth of the Unconquered Sun (or Dies Natalis Solis Invicti) was celebrated on the winter solstice—the "rebirth" of the Sun—which occurred on 25 December of the Julian calendar. In late antiquity, the theological centrality of the Sun in some Imperial religious systems suggests a form of a "solar monotheism". The religious commemorations on 25 December were replaced under Christian domination of the Empire with the birthday of Christ.

Much more ancient was the cult of Sol Indiges, supposed to have been introduced among Roman deities by the Sabines at the times of Titus Tatius.

==== Modern influence ====
Copernicus describing the Sun mythologically, drawing from Greco-Roman examples:

In the middle of all sits the Sun on his throne. In this loveliest of temples, could we place the luminary in any more appropriate place so that he may light the whole simultaneously. Rightly is he called the Lamp, the Mind, the Ruler of the Universe: Hermes Trismegistus entitles him the God Visible. Sophocles' Electra names him the All-seeing. Thus does the Sun sit as upon a royal dais ruling his children the planets which circle about him.

== World religions ==
=== The Sol/Mithras ===
Bust of Mithras

Sol Invictus and/or The Cult of Avestan Mithras (or Mihr) the sun god also known as the mysteries of the Persians , one of the most famous Indo-ranian and Roman ancient mystery religions.The Mithraic mysteries gradually declined after Emperor Constantine embraced Christianity in the early 4th century.Cult's ideology of “tauroctony” can be found in various sites.Worshippers of Mithras had a complex system of seven grades of initiation and communal ritual meals. Initiates called themselves syndexioi, those "united by the handshake"

=== Christianity ===
The comparison of Christ with the astronomical Sun is common in ancient Christian writings. By "the sun of righteousness" in Malachi 4 "the fathers, from Justin downward, and nearly all the earlier commentators understand Christ, who is supposed to be described as the rising sun". The New Testament itself contains a hymn fragment in Ephesians 5: "Awake, O sleeper, and arise from the dead, and Christ will shine on you." Clement of Alexandria wrote of "the Sun of the Resurrection, he who was born before the dawn, whose beams give light".

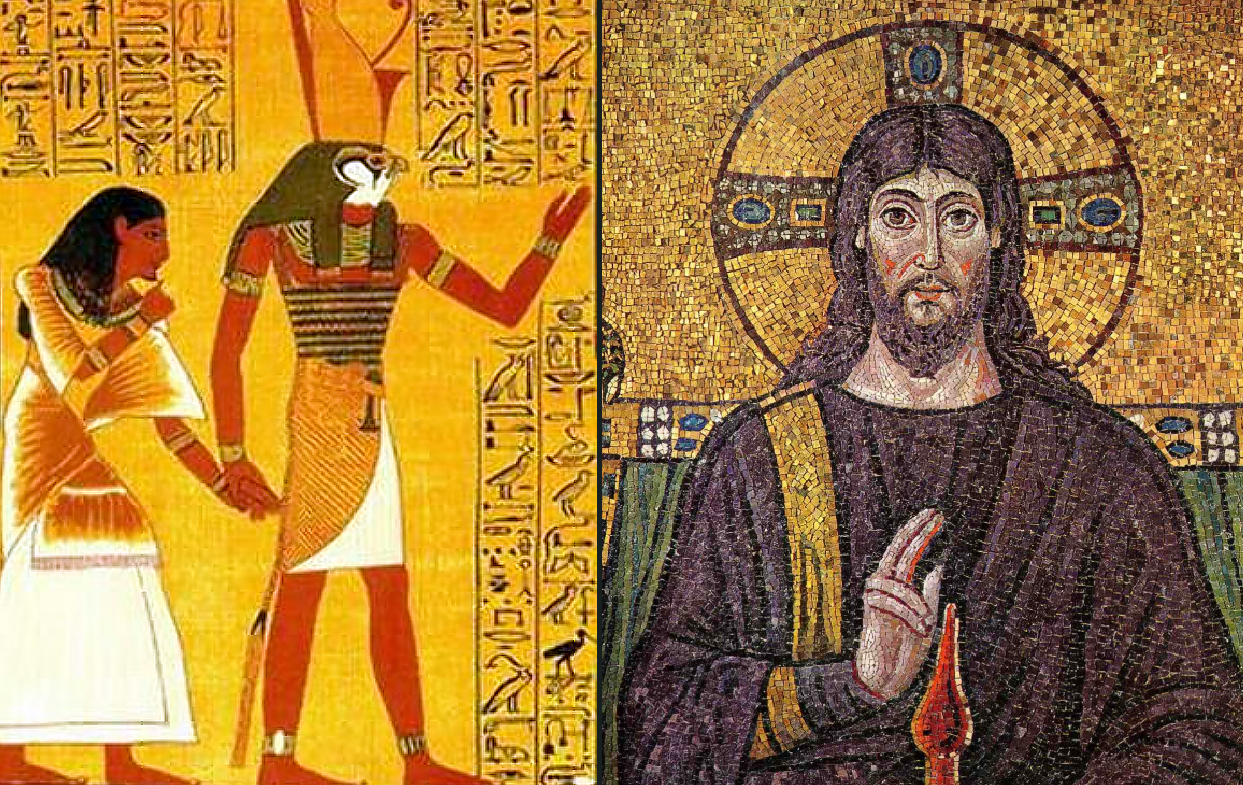
Horus left and Jesus right, both presented as "solar messiahs"

The pseudodocumentary Zeitgeist: The Movie (2007) asserts that Judas Iscariot is an allegory of Scorpio (with Jesus being a personification of the sun passing through the twelve constellations). When the sun transits Scorpio, Judas schemes with the Sanhedrin to arrest Jesus by kissing him. In the metaphorical sense, as the sun exited Libra in late autumn it enters Scorpio to be "kissed" by its stinger, which signifies the sun getting weaker as winter approaches. The three days after 21 December are the darkest as the sun is low in the sky, under Sagittarius's arrow, and therefore it is allegorized that, at this time, Jesus (the sun) dies for three days. After 25 December, the Sun moves 1 degree north, which indicate longer days or Jesus's resurrection.

American theosophist Alvin Boyd Kuhn had postulated that Jesus or the Abrahamic God is a sun god, with other figures in the Old Testament such as Samson (whose name means "sun" in Hebrew), King David, Solomon, Saul (meaning soul, or sol, the sun), Abraham, Moses, Gideon and Jephtha also being solar allegories. To corroborate his argument about God being a solar deity, Kuhn cites the Psalm's verses such as, "Our God is a living fire," "Our God is a consuming fire", "The Lord God is a sun", in addition to Jesus's "Christ will shine upon thee!", "I am come to send fire on earth" and "I am the light of the world".

==== Christianization of Natalis Invicti ====
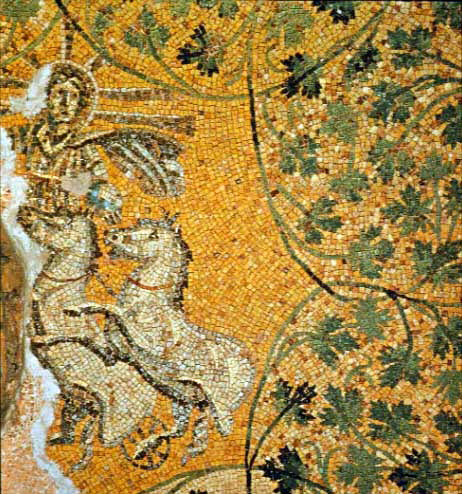
Mosaic of Christ as Sol or Apollo-Helios in Mausoleum M in the pre-4th-century necropolis beneath St. Peter's in the Vatican, which some interpret as representing Christ.

According to one hypothesis about Christmas, the date was set to 25 December because it was the date of the festival of Sol Invictus. The idea became popular especially in the 18th and 19th centuries.

The Philocalian calendar of AD 354 marks a festival of Natalis Invicti on 25 December. There is limited evidence that the festival was celebrated at around the time before the mid-4th century.

The earliest-known example of the idea that Christians chose to celebrate the birth of Jesus on 25 December because it was the date of an already existing festival of the Sol Invictus was expressed in an annotation to a manuscript of a work by 12th-century Syrian bishop Jacob Bar-Salibi. The scribe who added it wrote: "It was a custom of the Pagans to celebrate on the same 25 December the birthday of the Sun, at which they kindled lights in token of festivity. In these solemnities and revelries the Christians also took part. Accordingly when the doctors of the Church perceived that the Christians had a leaning to this festival, they took counsel and resolved that the true Nativity should be solemnized on that day."

==== Christian iconography ====
The charioteer in the mosaic of Mausoleum M has been interpreted by some as Christ by those who argue that Christians adopted the image of the Sun (Helios or Sol Invictus) to represent Christ. In this portrayal, he is a beardless figure with a flowing cloak in a chariot drawn by four white horses, as in the mosaic in Mausoleum M discovered under Saint Peter's Basilica and in an early-4th-century catacomb fresco. The nimbus of the figure under Saint Peter's Basilica is rayed, as in traditional pre-Christian representations. Clement of Alexandria had spoken of Christ driving his chariot across the sky. This interpretation is doubted by others: "Only the cross-shaped nimbus makes the Christian significance apparent". and the figure is seen by some simply as a representation of the sun with no explicit religious reference whatever, pagan or Christian.

=== Hinduism ===
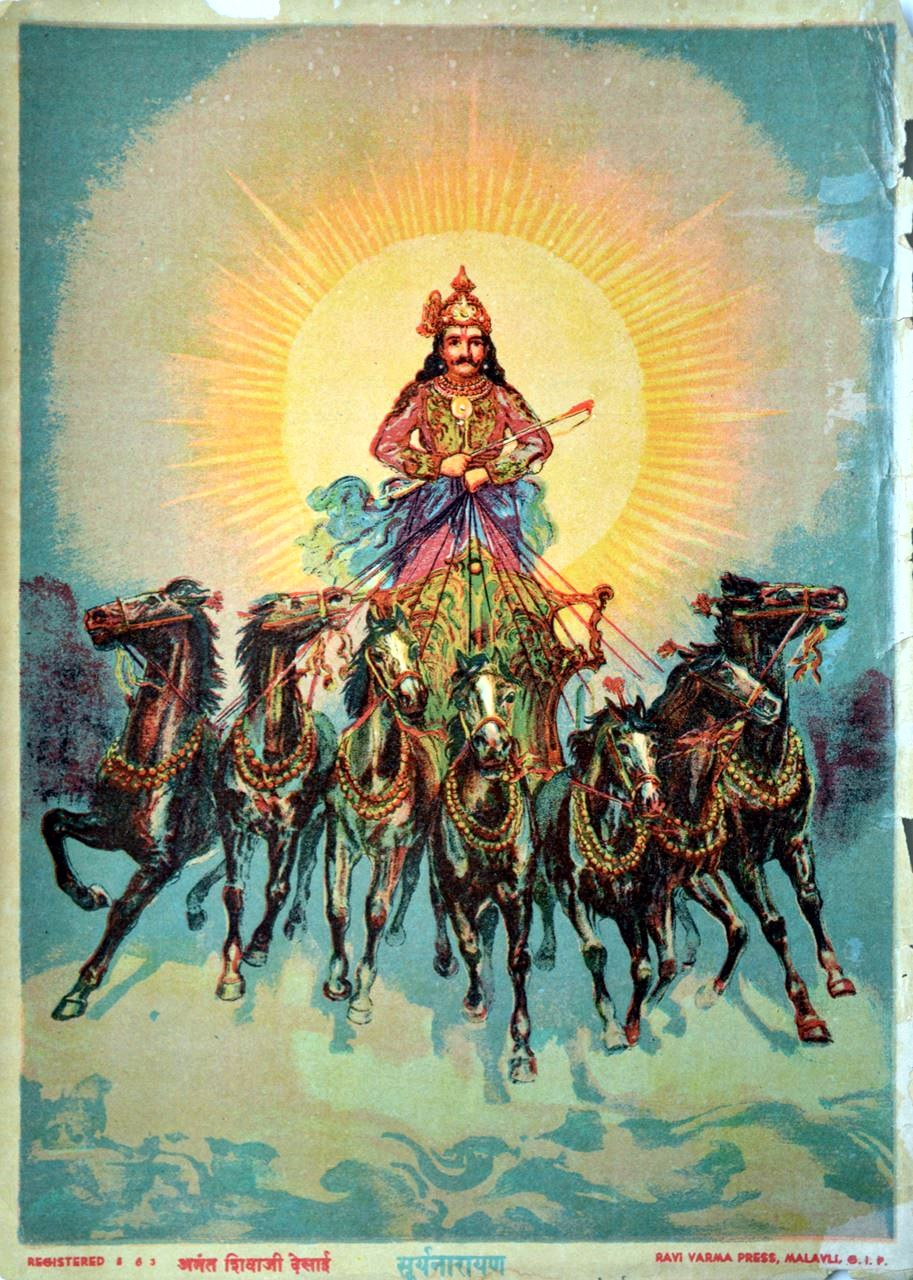
The Hindu solar deity Surya being driven across the sky in his chariot

==== Worship of Surya ====
The sun is prayed to by South Indians during the harvest festival.

In Tamil Nadu, the Tamil people worship the sun god during the Tamil month of Thai, after a year of crop farming. The month is known as the harvesting month and people pay respects to the sun on the first day of the Thai month known as Thai pongal, or Pongal, which is a four-day celebration. It is one of the few indigenous worships by the Tamil people.

In other parts of India, the festival is celebrated as Makar Sankranti and is mostly worshiped by Hindu diaspora.

== New religious movements ==
Solar deities are revered in certain new religious movements.

=== Theosophy ===
The primary local deity in Theosophy is the Solar Logos, "the consciousness of the sun".

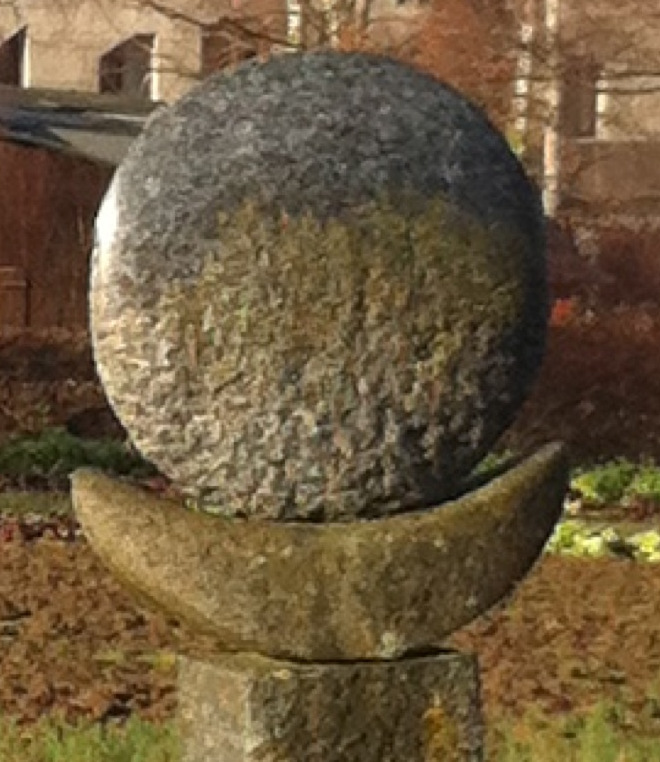
Anthroposophical sculpture near the Goetheanum in Dornach, Switzerland, depicting the Grail's iconography of the lunar cup that welcomes the Sun as a symbol of the Eucharist

=== Anthroposophy ===
Also in anthroposophy, the Sun is not merely a physical celestial body, but a supreme spiritual entity. Rudolf Steiner identifies it as the spiritual home of Christ, the cosmic Logos who united with the Earth through the event of Golgotha.

In this sense, the Sun represents the macrocosmic image of the human I, source of life, will, and individual consciousness, playing a central role in the Earth's evolution. The Sun also evolves, having passed through previous stages according to anthroposophical cosmogony. During the Old Sun stage, human beings received the seed of their etheric body (life forces) precisely through the action of the solar hierarchies.

Currently the Sun in anthroposophy symbolizes the warmth of knowledge, associated with the heart, often contrasted with the cold, lunar forces corresponding to the brain, which paralyze the solar impulse to make it bearable for humans.

=== Thelema ===
Thelema adapts its gods and goddesses from Ancient Egyptian religion, particularly those named in the Stele of Revealing, among whom is the Sun god Ra-Hoor-Khuit, a form of Horus. Ra-Hoor-Khuit is one of the principal deities described in Aleister Crowley's Liber AL vel Legis.

In Thelema, Ra-Hoor-Khuit represents the active, warlike aspect of the solar deity Horus, embodying the principles of strength and power. The Stele of Revealing, a funerary tablet from the 26th dynasty of Egypt, plays a central role in Crowley's cosmology, symbolizing the New Aeon of Horus. This Aeon is characterized by the themes of individualism, self-realization, and the discovery of one's True Will.

One of the key practices in Thelema is the daily performance of Liber Resh vel Helios, a set of solar adorations composed by Crowley. These rituals are performed at dawn, noon, sunset, and midnight, each directed towards different aspects of the Sun—Ra, Ahathoor, Tum, and Khephra, respectively. The practice aims to align the practitioner with the natural cycles of the Sun and to integrate the physical and spiritual dimensions of existence in accordance with Thelemic principles.

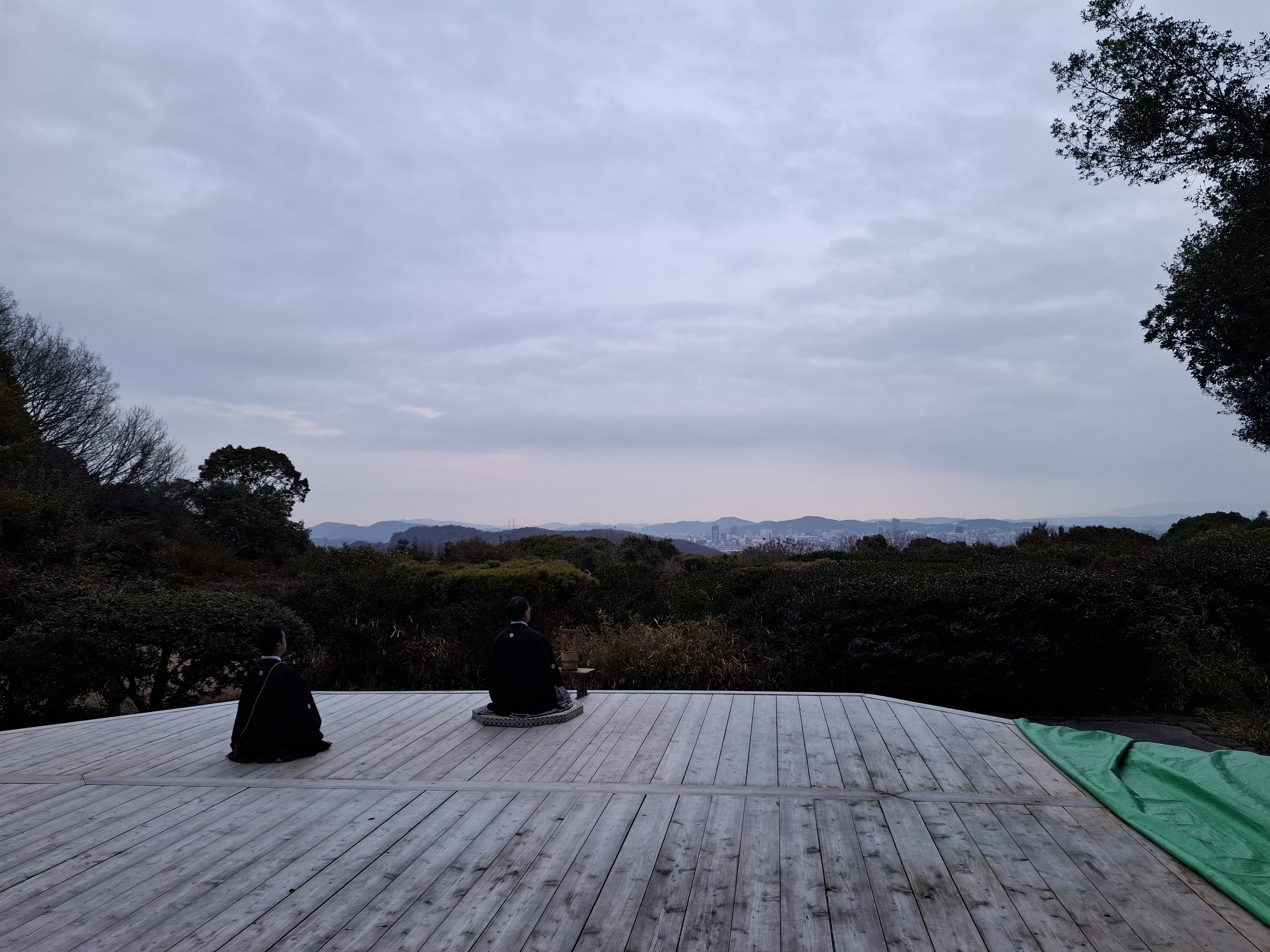
Kurozumikyō clergy performing nippai (日拝, sun worship) just before sunrise on Mount Shinto

The adoration of Ra-Hoor-Khuit and the performance of Liber Resh are intended to serve as daily reminders of the central Thelemic tenet, "Do what thou wilt shall be the whole of the Law." By engaging in these rituals, Thelemites seek to harmonize their personal will with the divine will, achieving greater spiritual enlightenment and alignment with the cosmic order.

=== Kurozumikyō ===
Kurozumikyō, founded by Kurozumi Munetada in 1814, is a Shinto-based Japanese new religion centered on solar worship. The solar deity Amaterasu is worshipped. Everyday at sunrise, the sun is worshipped at the Kurozumikyō headquarters on Shintō-zan (神道山, or "Mount Shinto") in Okayama, Japan.

== See also ==
- Abram Smythe Palmer
- Ame-no-Uzume
- Beaivi
- Canticle of the Sun
- Eki (goddess)
- Five Suns
- List of solar deities
- Lunar deity
- Nature worship
- Phoenix
- Shamash
- Solar symbol
- White horses in mythology
- Worship of heavenly bodies
- Zunbils
