= Kurozumi Munetada =

Japanese founder of Kurozumikyō (1780–1850)

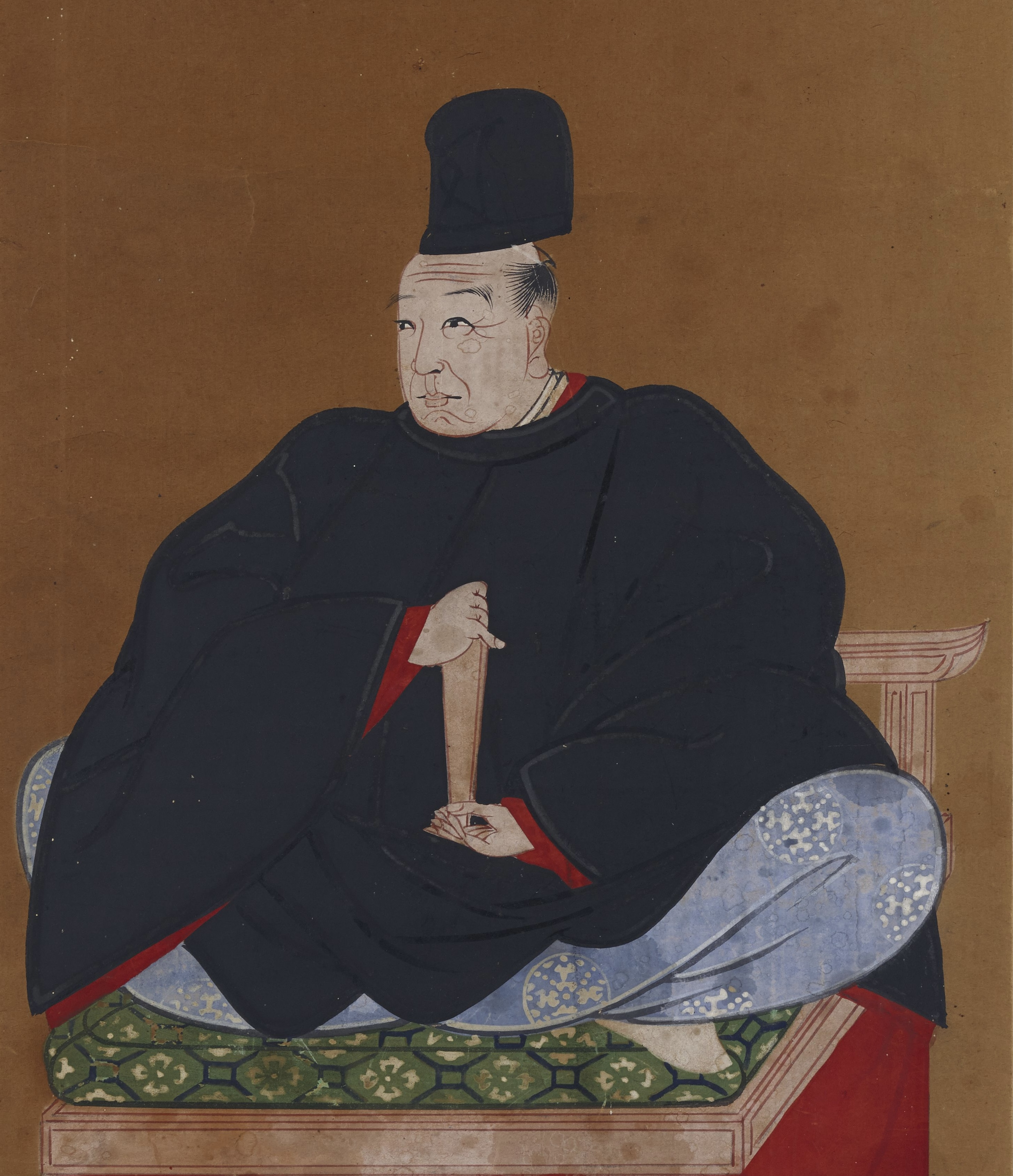

Personal life
- Born: December 22, 1780 (old lunar calendar date: 11th lunar month, 26th day (winter solstice)) Kaminakano 上中野村 (Ōmoto大元), Mino District (御野郡), Bizen Province (modern Okayama Prefecture), Japan
- Died: 1850 (age 69–70) Okayama, Japan
- Known for: Founding Kurozumikyō
- Occupation: Shintō priest; religious teacher

Religious life
- Religion: Kurozumikyō

Kurozumi Munetada (黒住宗忠) (December 22, 1780 – 1850) was a Japanese Shintō priest and the founder of Kurozumikyō, one of the earliest Sect Shintō movements. After a period of illness and bereavement, he experienced a mystical union with the solar deity Amaterasu during the winter solstice of 1814. From 1815 onwards, he preached and performed divine healings throughout western Japan.

== Biography ==
Kurozumi was born in Kaminakano (上中野) in Mino District (御野郡), Bizen Province (備前国) (in present-day Okayama Prefecture). He was the third son of Shinto priest Kurozumi Muneshige (黒住宗繁) of Imamura-gū (今村宮) and later used the stylistic name Sakyō (左京). In 1812, both of his parents died, and on the winter solstice of 1814, he experienced tenmei jikiju (天命直授) ("direct receipt of the heavenly mission"), described as mystical union with Amaterasu Ōmikami (天照大御神). His health resumed, and he began preaching and performing divine healings. As a result, he gained many followers from various social classes. He died in 1850 (old lunar calendar date: Kaei 3, 2nd month, 25th day (嘉永3年2月25日)).

== Teachings and practices ==
Kurozumi taught devotion to Amaterasu Ōmikami (天照大御神) as the supreme source of life and light, expressed through gratitude, cheerful sincerity, and daily moral discipline. Practice centers on daily sunrise worship, called nippai (日拝), and on cultivating a "bright heart" of thankfulness in ordinary life, as summarized in the 7-article Nichinichi kanai shintoku no koto (日々家内神徳之事) ("principles of everyday household life").

== Disciples and early followers ==
Many of Kurozumi's early followers were from the samurai class. A cohort known as the "six high disciples" (rokukōtei (六高弟)) — Ishio Kansuke (石尾乾介), Kawakami Tadaaki (河上忠晶), Tokio Munemichi (時尾宗道), Akagi Tadaharu (赤木忠春), Hoshijima Ryōhei (星島良平), and Morishita Keitan (森下景端) — played major roles in spreading the religion and helping to systematize the movement. After the Meiji Restoration, the religious group received official recognition as Kurozumi Kōsha (黒住講社) in 1872 and as Shintō Kurozumi-ha (神道黒住派) in 1876. Kurozumi's grandson Kurozumi Muneatsu (黒住宗篤) served as the organization's first kanchō (管長) (director).

== Munetada Shrines and religious headquarters ==
Kurozumi Munetada is venerated at a few different major shrines. Munetada Shrine (宗忠神社) in Yoshida Kaguraoka-chō (吉田神楽岡町), Kyoto (located just to the east of Kyoto University's main campus) was established in 1862 by disciples such as Akagi Tadaharu (赤木忠春). It was designated the sole imperial chokugansho (勅願所) by Emperor Kōmei in 1865. A second shrine, Ōmoto Munetada Shrine (大元宗忠神社) in the downtown area of Okayama (established 1885), stands near the founder's birthplace. Today, the headquarters of Kurozumikyō, where Kurozumi Munetada is also venerated, are located on Mount Shintō (神道山) in Okayama. At the headquarters (honbu (本部)) on Mount Shintō (神道山), adherents continue to perform daily nippai (日拝) observances led by the chief patriarch (教主, kyōshu).

== See also ==
- Akhenaten, Egyptian pharaoh who founded a religion promoting exclusive worship of the sun
- Konko Daijin, the founder of Konkokyo
