= Kurozumikyō =

Shinto-based Japanese new religion

- 黒住教
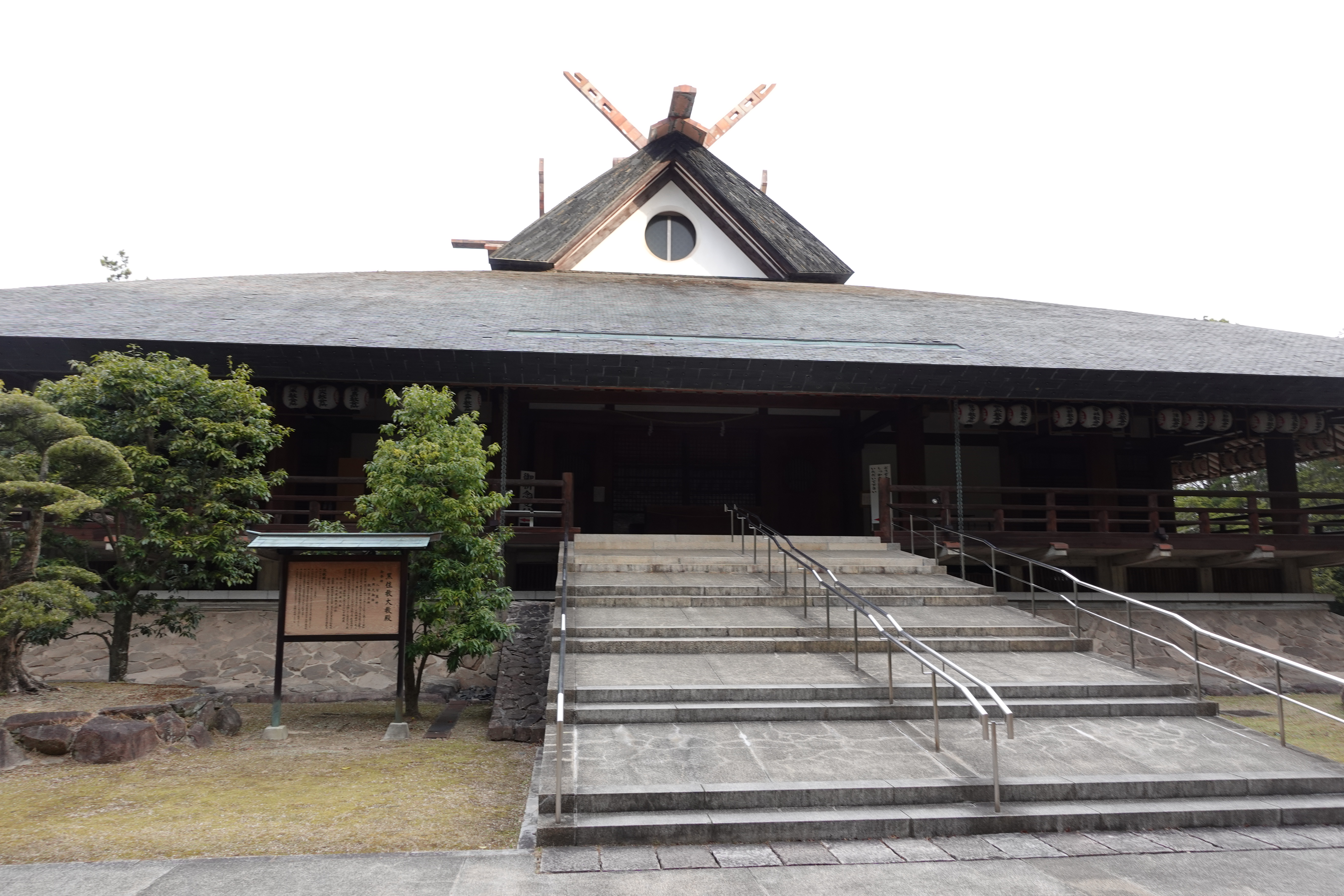
- Kurozumikyō headquarters on Mount Shinto in Okayama
- Type: Shinto-based
- Classification: Sect Shinto
- Scripture: Kurozumikyō Kyōsho (黒住教教書)
- Theology: Henotheism
- Chief Patriarch (教主): Kurozumi Munemichi (黒住宗道)
- Language: Japanese
- Headquarters: Mount Shinto on Mount Kibi no Nakayama, in Okayama
- Founder: Kurozumi Munetada (黒住宗忠)
- Origin: December 1814; Okayama
- Official website: www.kurozumikyo.com

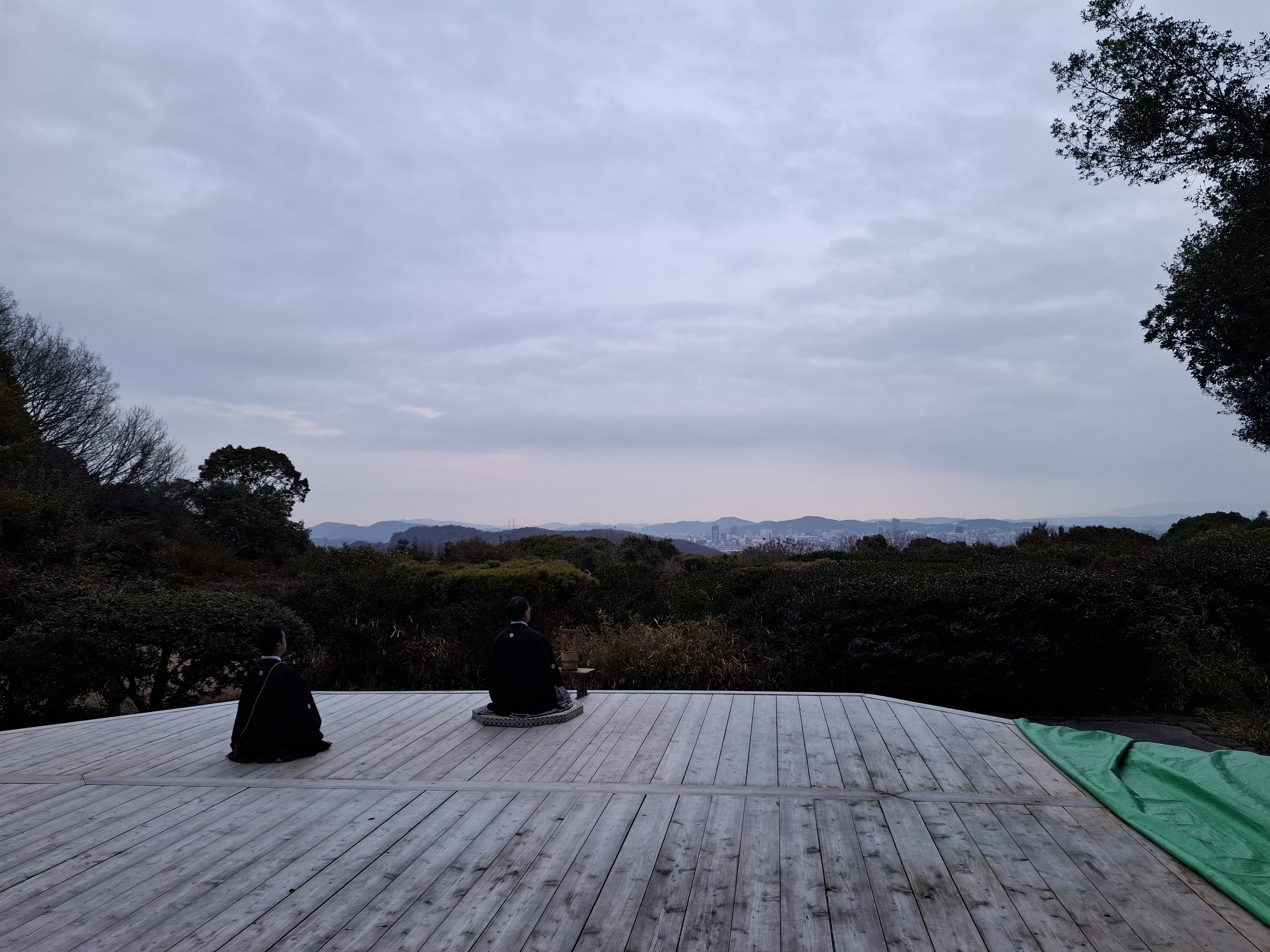
Kurozumikyō clergy performing nippai (日拝) ("sun worship") just before sunrise on Mount Shinto

Kurozumikyō (黒住教, lit. 'the Teachings of Kurozumi') is a Shinto-based Japanese new religion founded in Okayama during the 19th century. In 1814, the religion's founder, Munetada Kurozumi (黒住宗忠), claimed to have a divine union with Amaterasu, goddess of the sun and chief kami in the Shinto pantheon. The religion is characterized by its daily worship of the sun at sunrise, called nippai (日拝). Kurozumikyō only worships the sun as its primary deity. Kurozumikyō believes that all kami (spirits) are the manifestations of a single supreme deity, namely Amaterasu.

== Beliefs and practices ==
Sun worship, called nippai (日拝), is the core ritual of Kurozumikyō. The practice originates from Okayama folk religion, which also had nippai practices during the early 19th century.

Kurozumikyō believes that Amaterasu is the source of all light and life, and is the creator of the entire universe. Humanity is believed to be able to tap into the divine power of Amaterasu to heal the sick and perform other miracles. The religion is based in Okayama and focuses on the virtues of sincerity, selflessness, hard work, and affirmation of the established social order. The "Five Articles of Sincerity" (五つの誠) are:

1. Prayer (祈りの誠)
2. Filial piety (孝養の誠)
3. Service (奉仕の誠)
4. Thankfulness (感謝の誠)
5. Self-reflection (反省の誠)

The religion's beliefs are described in the Kurozumikyō Kyōsho (黒住教教書).

== History ==
Kurozumi's divine experience occurred during the winter solstice of 1814, which also happened to be his birthday. According to Hardacre (1986),

Facing the east at dawn, he inhaled the sun's rays deeply, and as he did so, the sun seemed to come down out of the sky, enter his mouth, and pervade his entire body, as if he had swallowed it. In this mystical experience he became one with the sun. This experience of unity with divinity, called the Direct Receipt of the Heavenly Mission (tenmei jikiju 天命直受), constituted the inspiration of the remainder of his life.

The religion was formally established as the Kurozumi Kyōdan (黒住教団) in 1846. Kurozumi and senior disciples assembled the Osadamegaki, putting into writing all the beliefs, values, and laws of the religion. Originally, their religious and missionary activity was tolerated by the feudal Okayama lord, as it did not threaten his power or conflict greatly with the religious beliefs already practiced in the area.

By the time of the Meiji Restoration in 1868, Kurozumikyō had gained followers across Japan, with followers concentrated mainly in western Japan. Okayama, Hiroshima, Tottori, and Shimane prefectures had the most followers, followed by the Kansai region. There were also some followers in Kyushu, Tokyo, and Hokkaido. In 1876, the Board of Shinto Affairs granted Kurozumikyō official status as a Shinto sect called Shintō Kurozumi-ha (神道黑住派). Kurozumikyō established its own Shinto shrine, the Munetada Shrine (宗忠神社), in Okayama in 1885.

== Headquarters location ==
Today, Kurozumikyō Honbu (黒住教本部), the headquarters of the religion, is located on Shintō-zan (神道山, or "Mount Shinto") in Okayama. Every morning before sunrise, the sun worshipping ritual nippai (日拝) is performed at a platform on Shintō-zan to honor the rising sun. Shintō-zan is a southeastern peak of Mount Kibi no Nakayama (吉備中山, Kibi Naka-yama). Kibitsu Shrine is located at the northwestern foot of the mountain near Kibitsu Station, and Kibitsuhiko Shrine at its northeastern foot near Bizen-Ichinomiya Station. Kurozumikyō Honbu can be accessed via a hiking trail that starts from Kibitsuhiko Shrine, or via a paved road from Kibitsu Shrine.

Munetada Shrine (宗忠神社, Munetada Jinja), Kurozumikyō's former headquarters, is located near Ōmoto Station in Okayama's city center. The headquarters was moved to Mount Shinto in order to allow for better sunrise views.

== List of Chief Patriarchs ==
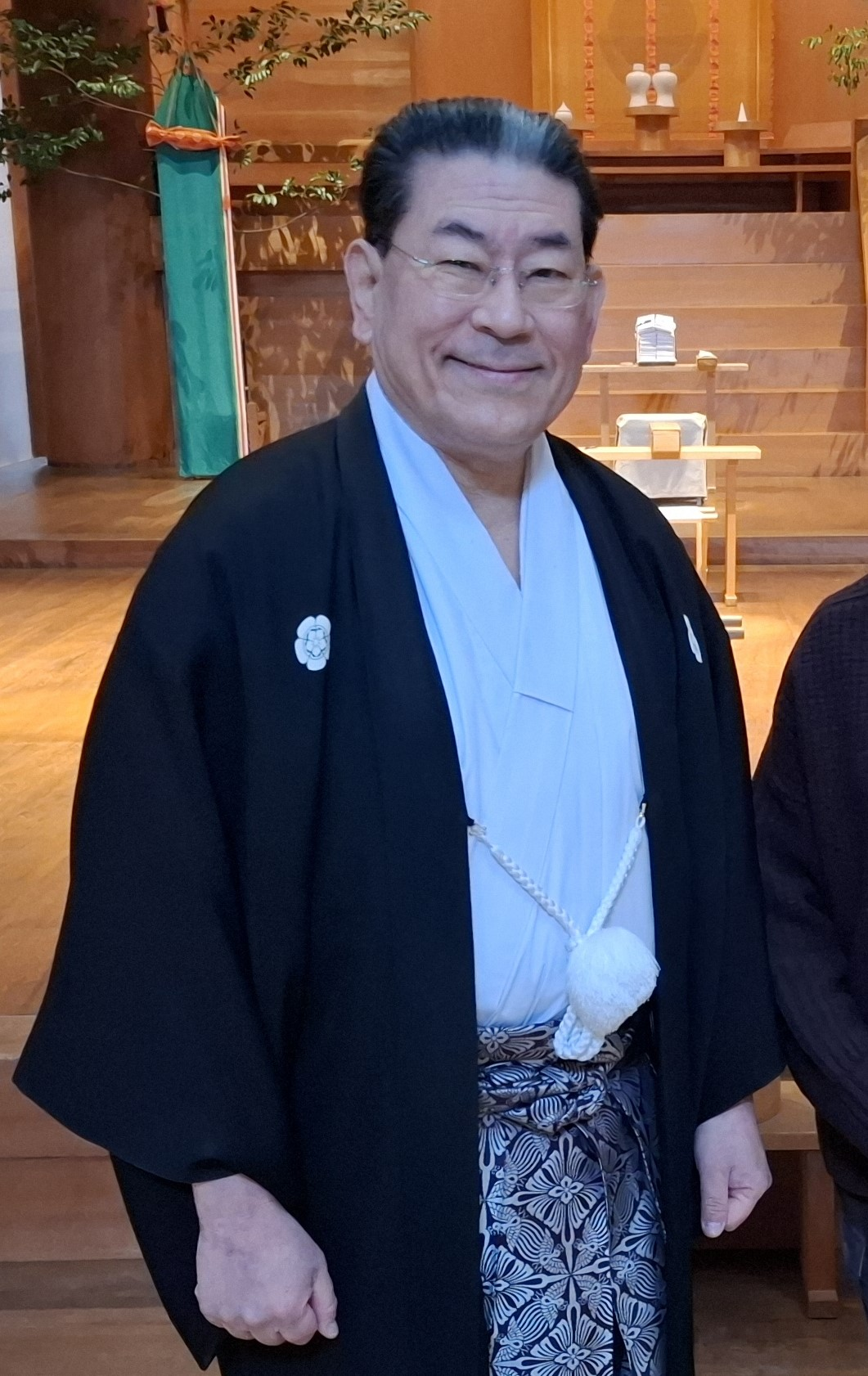
Kurozumi Munemichi, the current patriarch of Kurozumikyō

List of Chief Patriarchs of Kurozumikyō:

1. Kurozumi Munetada (黒住宗忠, patriarch from 1814–1850)
2. Kurozumi Munenobu (黒住宗信, patriarch from 1850–1856)
3. Kurozumi Muneatsu (黒住宗篤, patriarch from 1856–1889)
4. Kurozumi Muneyasu (黒住宗子, patriarch from 1889–1936)
5. Kurozumi Munekazu (黒住宗和, patriarch from 1936–1973)
6. Kurozumi Muneharu (黒住宗晴, patriarch from 1973–2017)
7. Kurozumi Munemichi (黒住宗道, patriarch from 2017–present)

== Publications ==
Selected books published by the Kurozumikyō headquarters in Okayama:

- 黒住教教書 (Kurozumikyō scriptures)
- 黒住教教典抄 (Selected Kurozumikyō scriptures)
- 黒住教教祖伝 (Kurozumikyō founder biography) (1994 English edition: The Opening Way)
- 教祖様の御逸話 (Kurozumikyō founder stories; contains over 120 stories) (2000 English edition: The Living Way)
- 哲人宗忠 (Munetada the Philosopher) (1980 English edition: The brilliant life of Munetada Kurozumi)

== See also ==
- Atenism in Ancient Egypt
