= Mount Kibi no Nakayama =

Sacred mountain in Okayama, Japan

- Kibi no Nakayama (吉備の中山)
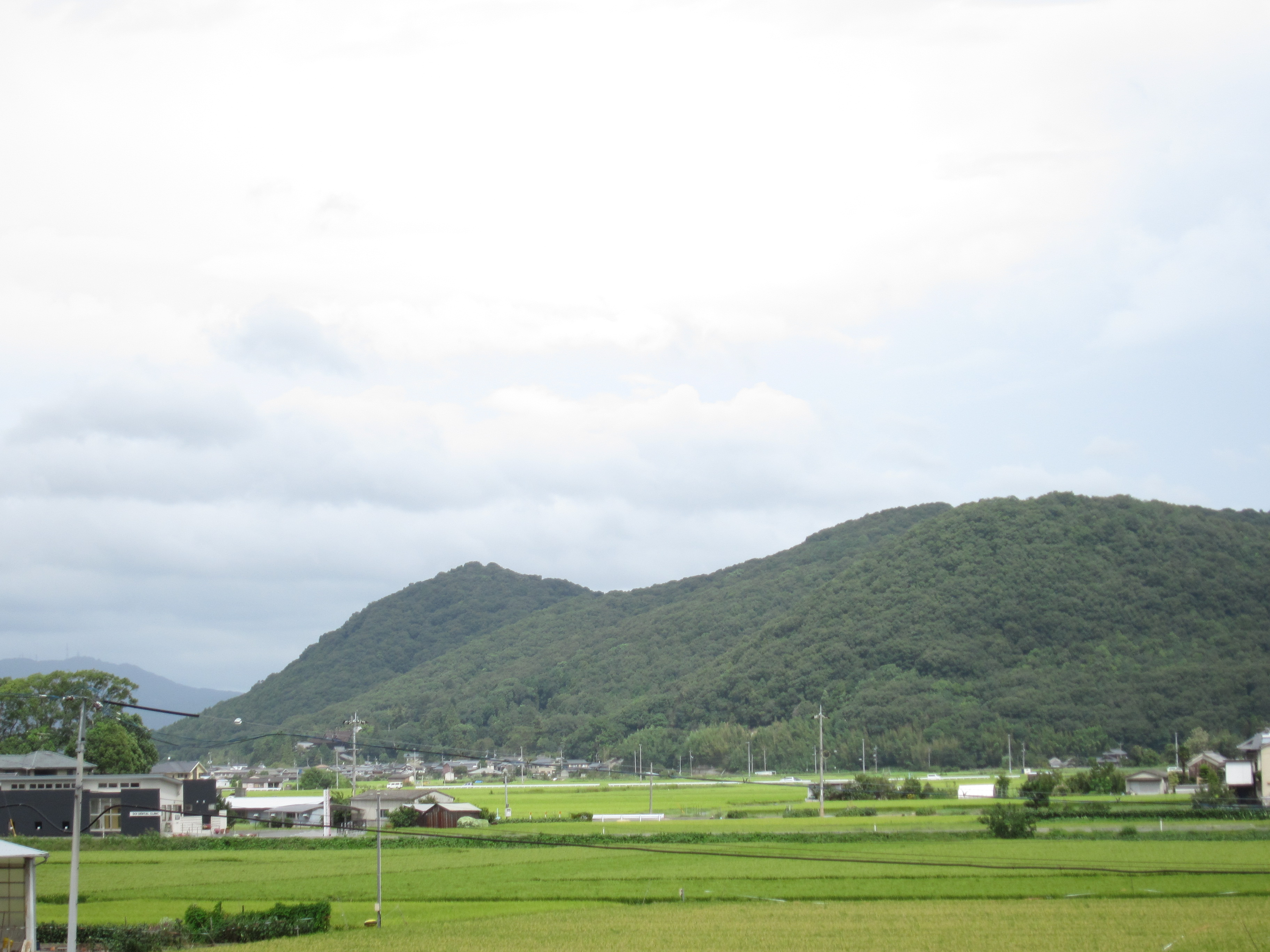
- A view of Mount Kibi no Nakayama

Highest point
- Elevation: 175 m (574 ft)
- Coordinates: 34°40′07″N 133°51′17″E

Geography
- Location: Kita-ku, Okayama, Japan

Mount Kibi no Nakayama (Japanese: 吉備の中山, Hepburn: Kibi no Naka-yama) is a sacred hill (shintai-zan 神体山) in Kita-ku, Okayama, Japan.

== Notable sites ==
The hill is located in the western part of Okayama city within walking distance of Kibitsu Station and Bizen-Ichinomiya Station. Kibitsu Shrine is situated at the northwestern foot of Mount Kibi no Nakayama (吉備の中山; elevation: 175 meters) on the border between the historical provinces of Bizen and Bitchū. It has been worshipped as a sacred mountain since ancient times.

Kibitsuhiko Shrine is situated at the northeastern foot of Mount Kibi no Nakayama.

Kurozumikyō Honbu (黒住教本部), the headquarters of the Shinto sect Kurozumikyō, is located on Shintō-zan (神道山) (lit. 'Mount Shinto'), one of the peaks of Mount Kibi no Nakayama that is located southeast of the mountain's highest point. Every morning before sunset, the sun worshipping ritual nippai (日拝) is performed at a platform on Shintō-zan to honor the rising sun. Kurozumikyō Honbu can be accessed via a hiking trail that starts from Kibitsuhiko Shrine, or via a paved road from Kibitsu Shrine. The trail passes by several iwakura rocks.

== See also ==
- Kingdom of Kibi
- Kibi Province
