= Futamigaura =

Futamigaura may refer to:

- Futamigaura, Fukuoka
- Futami-ga-ura, Mie
