= Kanjo Nawa =

Japanese ropework custom

Kanjo Nawa (Japanese: 勧請縄) is a Japanese custom of stretching shimenawa, a variety of laid rope, with fetishes hung at the border of a village. Michi Kiri (道切り) is just a similar custom. The term Kanjo Nawa also refers to the rope itself.

In rural area around Japan, there remains the custom of enshrining the items such as ropes of straw and grass, dolls, and straw sandals at the border of the village intended to prevent the evil such as an epidemic from entering the village, or to drive out the evil.

The custom called Kanjo Nawa can be found around the Kinki Region, especially in Wakasa, Fukui Prefecture, in the east and south of Shiga Prefecture, in Iga, Mie Prefecture, in the east mountainous region of Nara Prefecture, and in Minami-Yamashiro of Kyoto Prefecture. Kanjo Nawa is also known as Kanjo Tsuri (勧請吊).

== Examples ==
- Kanjo Nawa in Asukaji, Kasagi, Kyoto
  In Asukaji, in every January, villagers create Shimenawa, which is stretched over Nunome-Gawa River, running through the village, in order to pray for prosperity and safety. One person per household is supposed to attend the event. Tsukurimono (ツクリモノ), imitating farming equipment, daily-life instrument or sexual organs, is hung on Shimenawa. It was recognized as Intangible Folk Cultural Properties in 1998.
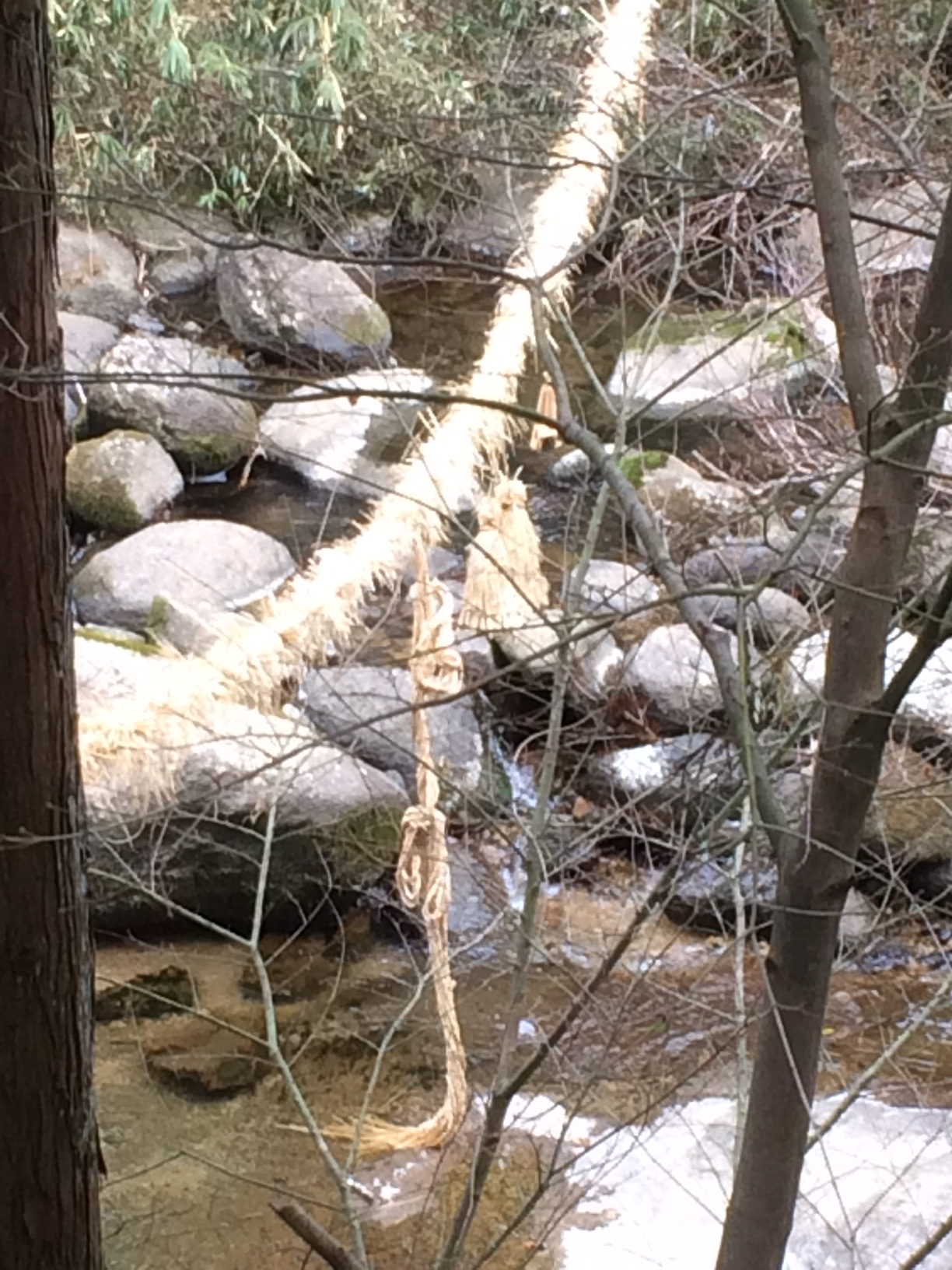
Kanjo Nawa stretched over the river in Asukaji

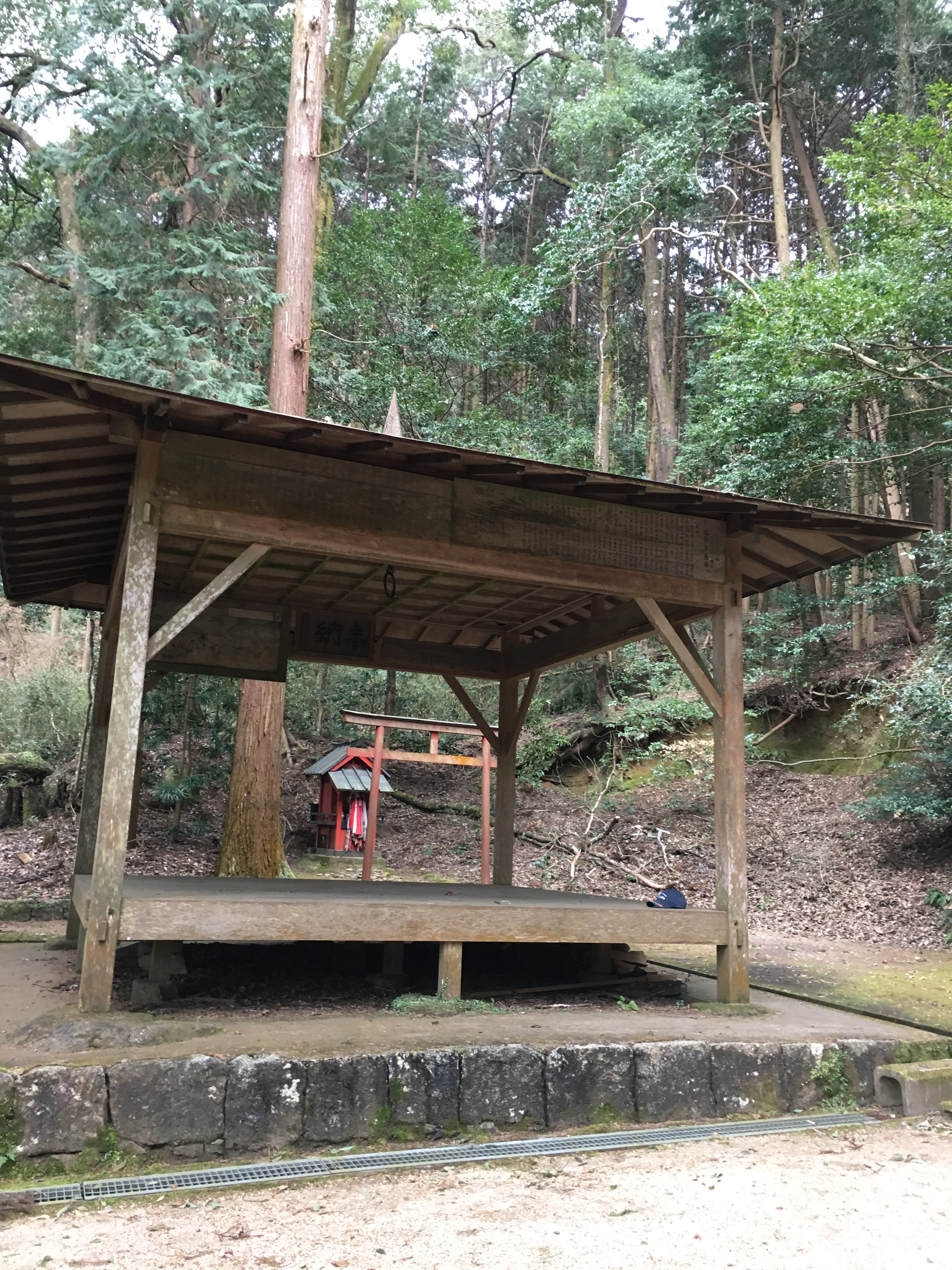
The stage of Amaterasumikado Shrine (天照御門神社) in Kasagi, where Kanjo Nawa is created.

== See also ==
- Michi Kiri – Similar custom
- Shimenawa
