= Futami-ga-ura, Mie =

Futami-ga-ura
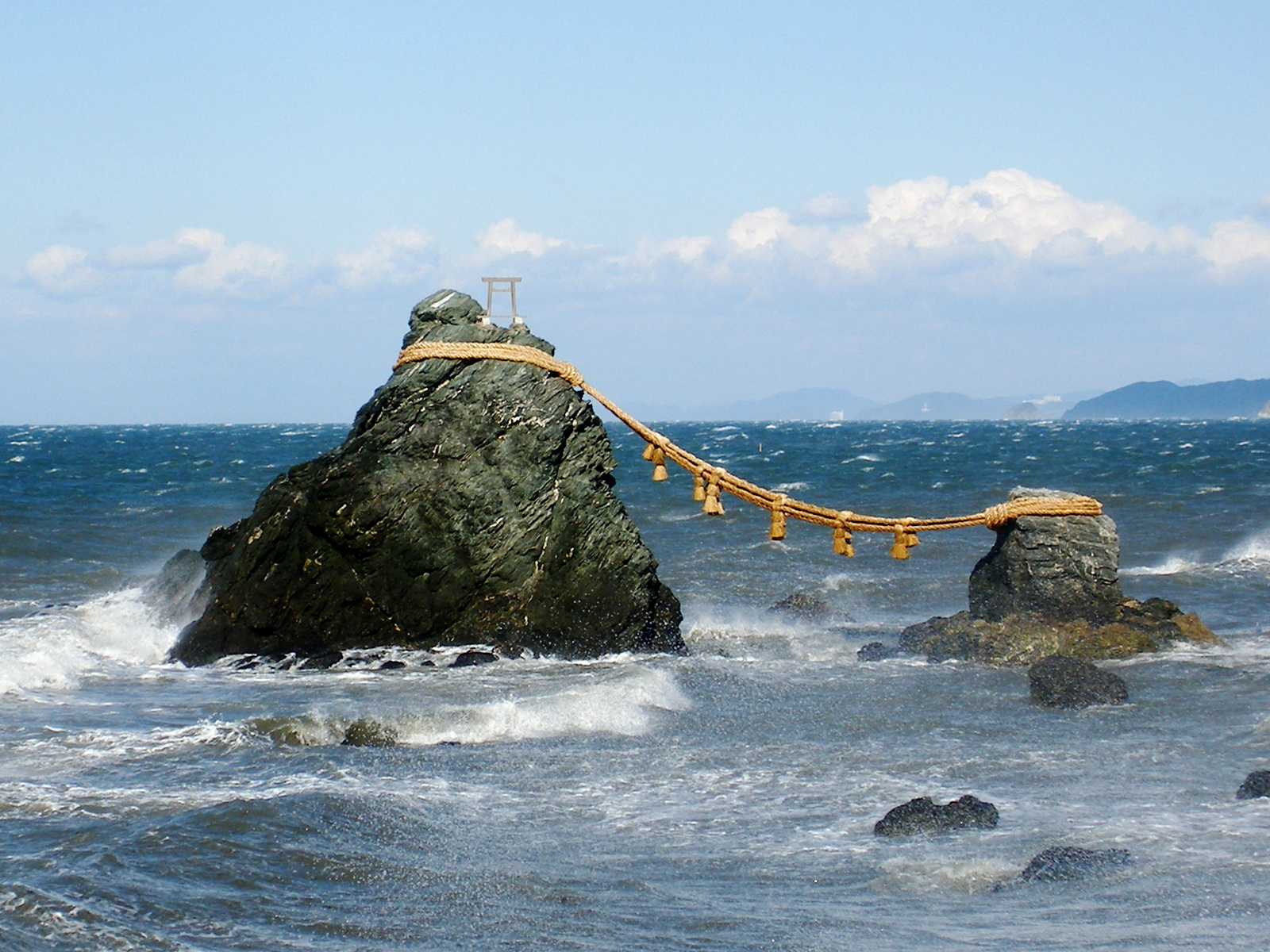
- Interactive map of Futami-ga-ura
- Coordinates: 34.50929°N 136.7909°E
- Country: Japan
- Prefecture: Mie Prefecture
- Time zone: Japan Standard Time
- Geocode: http://sws.geonames.org/1863740

Futami-ga-ura is a sub-bay or inlet of Ise Bay in Japan, where the Isuzu River enters the bay. It is located in Mie prefecture, in the southern part of the country, 300 km southwest of Tokyo.

It is where the famous Meoto Iwa rocks are found.

Futami-ga-ura in Japan

== Description ==
Futami-ga-ura is a delta formed at the mouth of the Isuzu River that flows into Ise Bay. It is part of Ise-Shima National Park that has been designated a national scenic spot, and has been selected as one of Japan's 100 best beaches. It has sometimes served as a site for ritual purification (misogi) prior to worshiping at Ise Jingu.

A rock formation called Meoto Iwa, which is within the precincts of Futami Okitama Shrine in Tateishizaki, is a well-known geological feature with significance to Shinto devotees.

== Climate ==
The climate is temperate. The average temperature is 14 °C. The warmest month is July, at 23 °C, and the coldest January, at 5 °C. The average rainfall is 2,387 millimeters per year. The wettest month is June, with 316 millimeters of rain, and the wettest January, with 60 millimeters.

Futami-ura

Climate chart (precipitation, max. and min. temperature)
J	F	M	A	M	J	J	A	S	O	N	D
60 7 3	157 9 4	164 10 5	256 17 9	196 19 14	316 20 16	188 25 21	244 25 21	313 22 20	259 19 16	118 15 11	115 10 6
- █ Average max. and min. temperatures in °C
- █ Precipitation totals in mm
Imperial conversion
J	F	M	A	M	J	J	A	S	O	N	D
2.4 45 37	6.2 48 39	6.5 50 41	10 63 48	7.7 66 57	12 68 61	7.4 77 70	9.6 77 70	12 72 68	10 66 61	4.6 59 52	4.5 50 43
- █ Average max. and min. temperatures in °F
- █ Precipitation totals in inches

== Futaminoura Beach ==
Futami beach was opened in 1881 ( Meiji 15) by the first Surgeon general, Matsumoto Ryōjun, and was designated by the Director of the Ministry of Home Affairs, Sanitation Bureau, Nagayo in 1882 (Meiji 16), the first officially recognized beach in Japan. It is said that Emperor Taisho also trained in swimming when he was a child. At that time, the sea bathing was for medical purposes (bath digging), and there were cold baths that went into the sea and hot baths that were soaked in seawater warmed by a bathtub on the beach. Including, the inn town that sings Shioyuji was formed

== Guest house ==
There is a guest house Hinjitsukan located in the area. It was designated a tangible cultural property designated by Mie Prefecture on March 17, 2004. It was designated a national important cultural property on June 29, 2010 .
