= Kashima Island =

Island in Japan

Coordinates: 33°58′27″N 132°45′52″E

Kashima Island (Ehime Prefecture)

Kashima (鹿島) is a small island off the coast of Hōjō, Matsuyama, in Ehime Prefecture, Japan. Aptly named "Deer Island," Kashima is home to a flourishing population of Sika deer. The island is about 1.5 km in circumference and 114 meters high at its peak with a 400-meter long white sand beach. Having inhabited the island for thousands of years, Kashima's deer are a designated "natural treasure of Ehime Prefecture." They are accessible for feeding and photos in an enclosure on the east end of the island, north of the ferry pier.

Kashima has a multitude of tourist attractions, such as a forest with hiking trails, a campsite, a Shinto shrine, and shops. It can be accessed by a ferry that runs from Hōjō Port.

== Overview ==
Kashima hosts over 260 species of plants in its laurel forest, which remains uncultivated, with four hiking trails available to explore the woods. In the heart of Kashima Forest is the observation platform, a 20-minute trek from the base, where a panoramic view of Hōjō and the Seto Inland Sea is visible. In October of 2014, a "Bell of Happiness" was installed at the observation platform for couples to ring while viewing a rock formation west of the island called Iyo Futami to strengthen their love.

Multiple accommodations for shopping and food are available on the island. There is one restaurant, Otaya, on the northeastern end, where diners can enjoy fresh seafood and tai meshi, a local dish of Ehime. Legend holds that Empress Jingū was served tai meshi during a trip to Kashima as a prayer for her success in her conquest of the Korean Peninsula.The restaurant is open from late April through early November; during this season, particularly in the summer, the island becomes a popular tourist spot for camping and barbecues. Snorkelers and swimmers are welcome to use the public beach during the swimming season, July to early September. Watanabe Shōten, a short walk from the ferry pier, offers convenience store goods as well as treats for feeding the deer.

Additional sites include the Kashima Museum of Natural History and Archeology (鹿島博物展示館), a souvenir shop, and a free campsite with public toilets, showers, and cooking facilities.

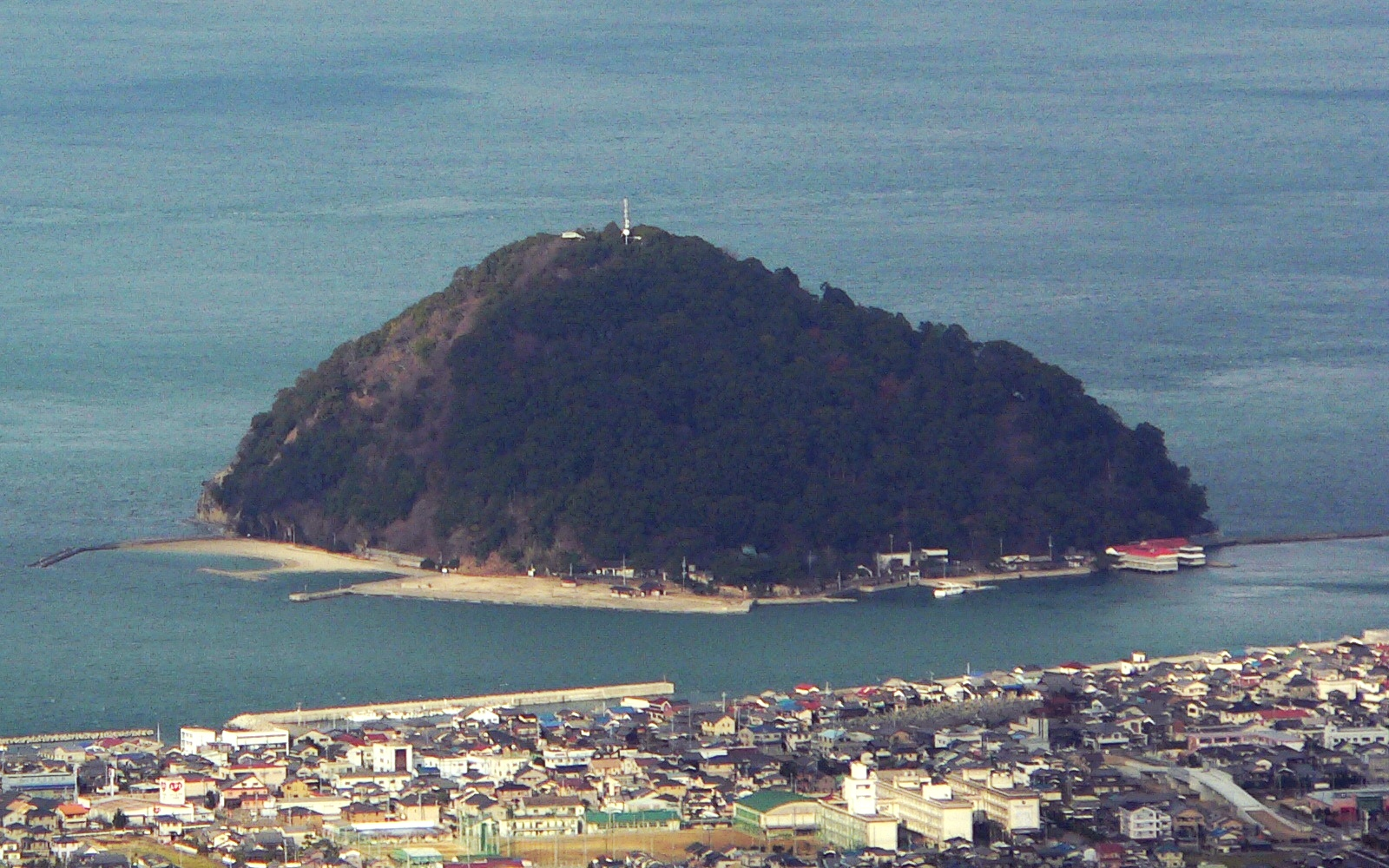
View of Kashima from Matsuyama.

== Kōno origins ==
The island has a rich history predating samurai times. According to legend, in the Battle of Yashima in 1185, the Kōno prayed for victory by stretching a Shimenawa (注連縄) to Iyo Futami. Every May at the Hōjō Kashima Spring Festival, the Minamoto victory is commemorated with a shimenawa replacement ceremony. Local volunteer firemen twist a new rope made of rice straw twine and transport it by boat first to Kashima Shrine for a blessing and later to Iyo Futami to replace the previous year's rope. Other festivities at the festival strive to honor the naval accolades of the Kōno and their protection of the Seto Inland Sea, including a ritual dance performance held on wooden boats called kaineri odori (櫂練り踊り) and other arts performances held at Kashima Shrine. A similar festival is celebrated at the shrine and on the mainland in Hōjō each October.
