= Meoto Iwa =

Type of sacred rocks in Shinto

Coordinates: 34°30′34″N 136°47′18″E

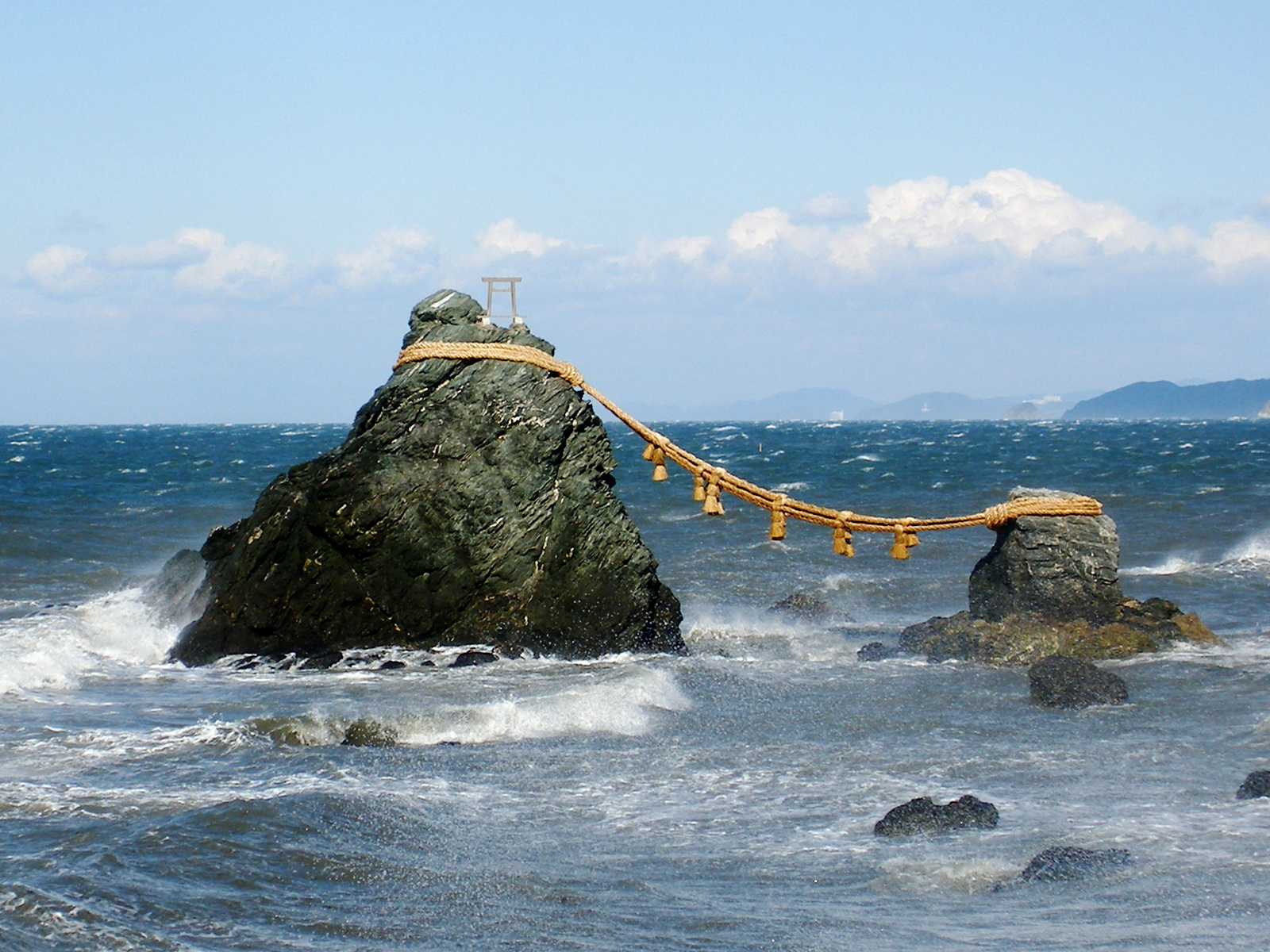
Meoto Iwa, the wedded rocks, daytime

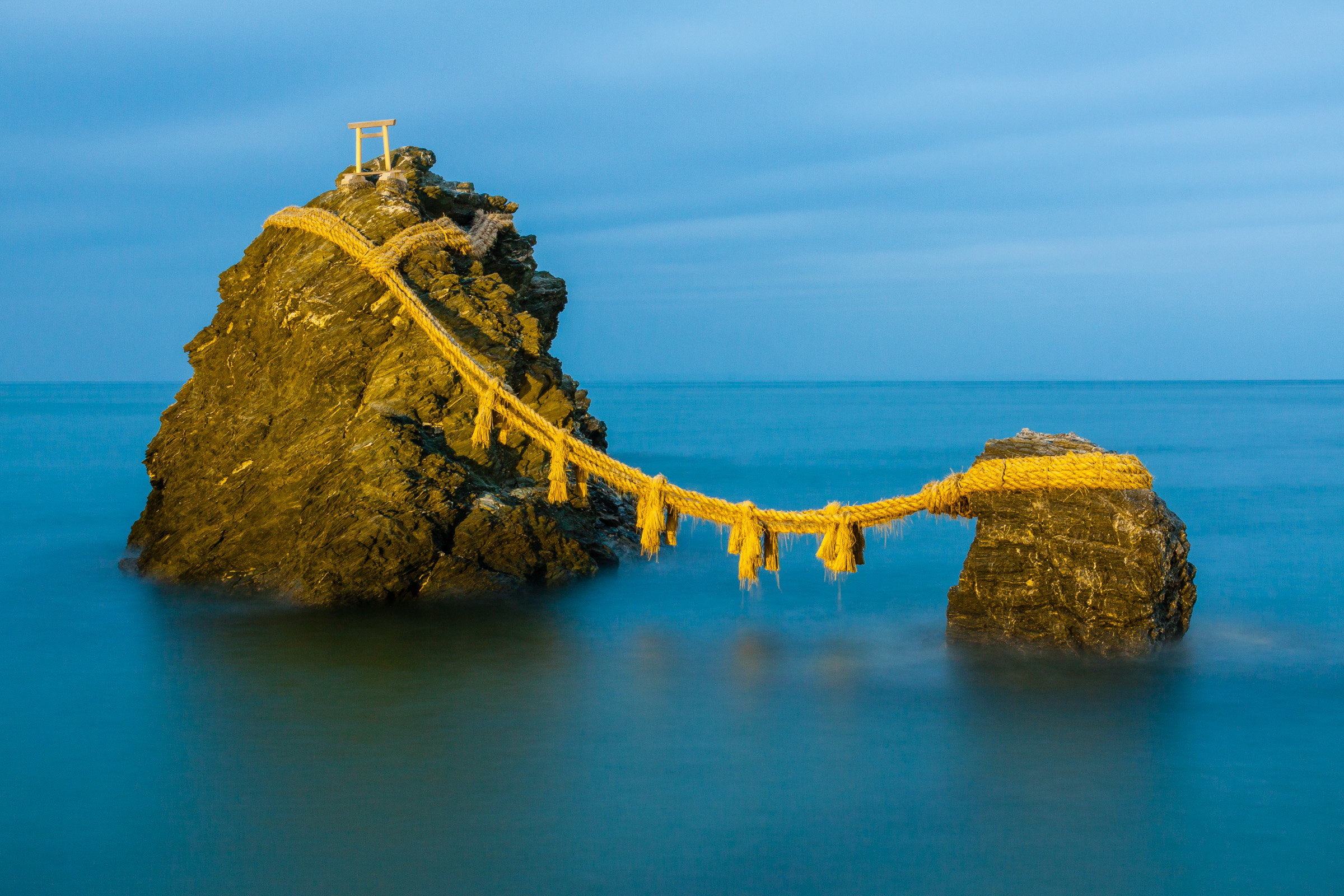
Meoto Iwa, the wedded rocks, at dusk

Meoto Iwa (夫婦岩), or Married Couple Rocks, are a kind of rock formation seen as religiously significant in Shinto. They are a subtype of Iwakura rock.

According to Shinto, the rocks represent the union of the creator kami, Izanagi and Izanami. The rocks, therefore, celebrate the union in marriage of man and woman.

The most famous pair is the pair at Futami Okitama Shrine in Futami-ga-ura, two rocky stacks off the coast from Ise, Mie, Japan. They are joined by a shimenawa (a heavy rope of rice straw) and are considered sacred by worshippers of the shrine. The shimenawa, composed of five separate strands which each have a mass of 40 kilograms, must be replaced several times a year in a special ceremony. The larger rock, said to be male, has a small torii at its peak.

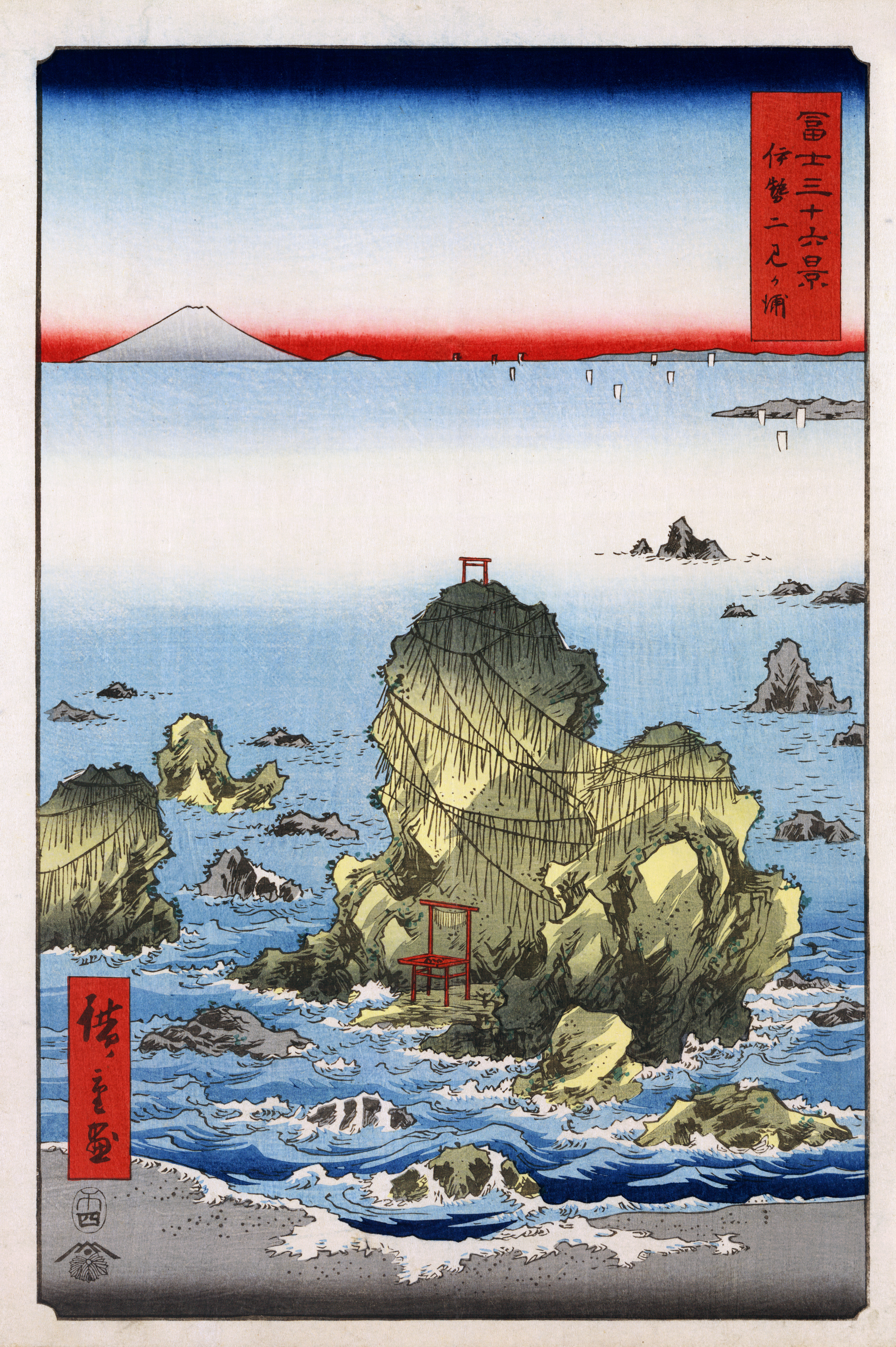
No. 27 in the series Thirty-six views of Mount Fuji by Utagawa Hiroshige, 1858.

At dawn during the summer, the sun appears to rise between the two rocks. Mount Fuji is visible in the distance. At low tide, the rocks are not separated by water.

Okitama Shrine is dedicated to Sarutahiko Ōkami and imperial food goddess Ukanomitama. There are numerous statues of frogs around the shrine. The shrine and the two rocks are near the Grand Shrine of Ise, the most important location of purification in Shinto.

== Outline ==
The couple rocks at Futami Okitama Shrine in Mie Prefecture Ise City have been known for a long time, as depicted by Ukiyo-e artist in the Edo period, and are generally used as a symbol and prayer for marital bliss and domestic safety, maritime security and great catch, and is said to be a symbol of Iwakura Shinko in Kojindo, which means a symbolic place or object in nature, especially megaliths, rocks, and mountains, were considered shintais and believed to be places where kamis resided. For this reason, shimenawas and toriis were decorated as proof that a deity resided there (kanzumaru).

It is also an embodiment of the concept of duality that pervades ancient and current Shinto, such as the idea that this world consists of Utsushi-yo and Tokoyo, and the Seven Lucky Gods of Ebisu and Daikoku, two of the Seven Lucky Gods, are believed to be one, and the counting of chopsticks and footwear as one set or one pair is also said to be unique to Japan.

In the Kojiki, there are many myths about married couples, from Izanami and Izanagi to Sarutahiko Ōkami and Ame-no-Uzume. It is thought that these became Sai no Kami (Dōsojin), and were connected with the belief in a rock formation. This is why Jizō and Dōsojin are often depicted as a couple or as a pair of large and small rocks or stone statues. This kind of belief in married couples has spread throughout the world over time and has become familiar in the form of married couple's bowls, etc. At the same time, it is deeply related to the belief in child-rearing and child-bearing in the framework of family, such as householder and home. The 'Iwana' are deeply related to the belief in child-bearing, child-rearing, and the treasure of children.

These ideas of rock-building belief, Omote-Taiwanai and matrimonial belief (also called matrimonial harmony, which is the basis of ancestral spirit belief) are combined to form the object of enshrinement at the couple's rock.

== Oshimenawa ==
An example of an oshimenawa is Tateishi in Futami Town, Ise City, Mie Prefecture. The large shimenawa rope connecting Tateishi and Nejiriwa, known as "husband and wife rocks," is believed to be the torii (gateway) to the offshore Kohtama Shrine stone, and is reattached three times a year in December (before the New Year), May, and September. During the shimenawa-renawa-renawa-renawa-renawa-renawa-renawa-renawa ceremony, a woodcarving song is sung, and some people take pieces of the old rope home as a good-luck charm for marital bliss.

== Influence ==
American composer Roger Reynolds took reference to the form of Meoto Iwa in Futami, where he visited in 1966, while composing the first movement "Futami ga Ura" of his second symphony, "Symphony [Myths]" (1990). Divided into 3 sections, the first and the last with "densely stratified texture" represent Izanagi and Izanami rocks respectively, and the middle section represents the space in-between.

== National Married Couple Rocks Summit ==
The National Married Couple Rocks Summit Liaison Council has been formed by 10 tourist spots in Japan that have married couple rocks or rocks for married couples, and is holding the National Married Couple Rocks Summit.

== Married couple rocks around Japan ==
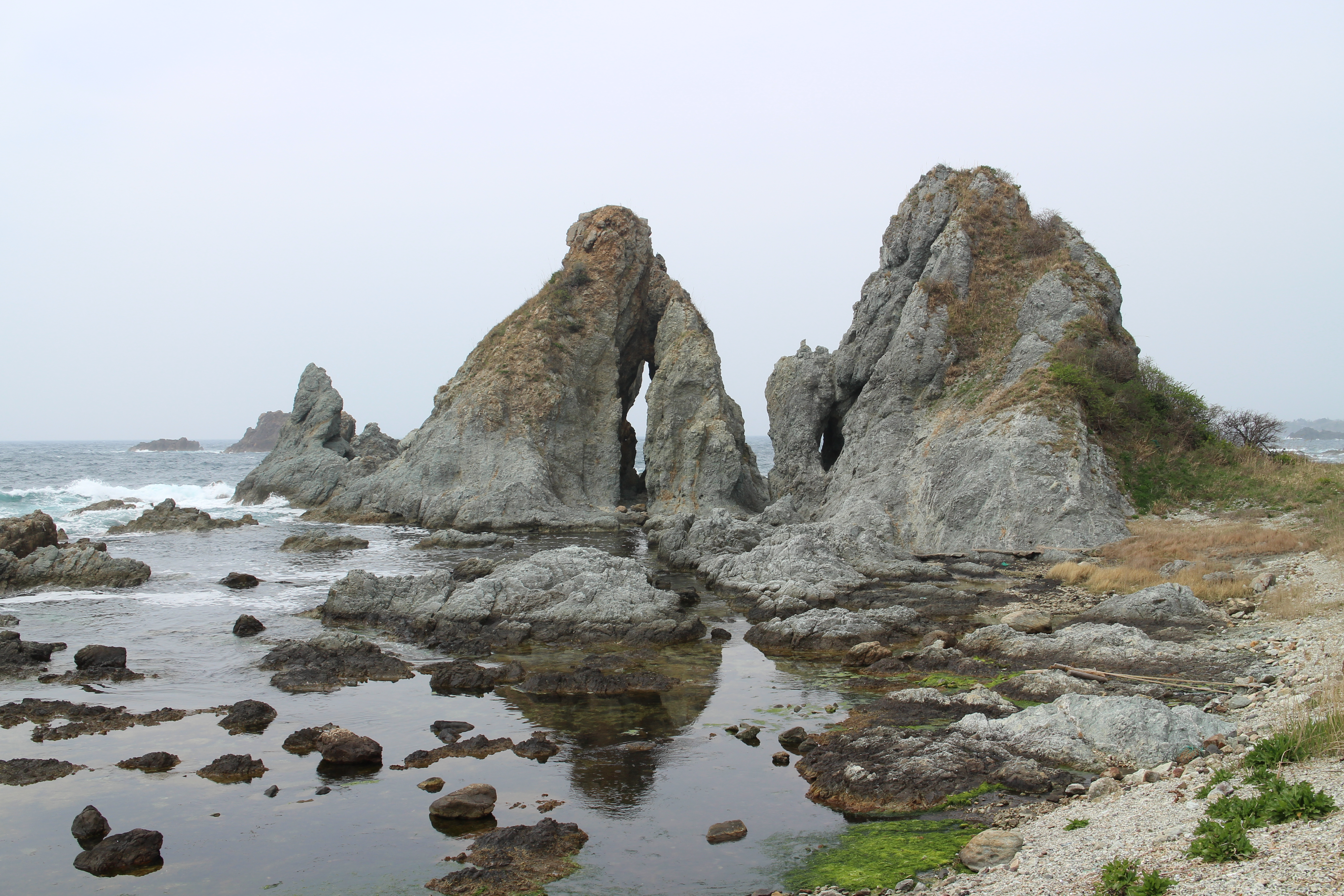
In Sado, Sado Island, Niigata Prefecture

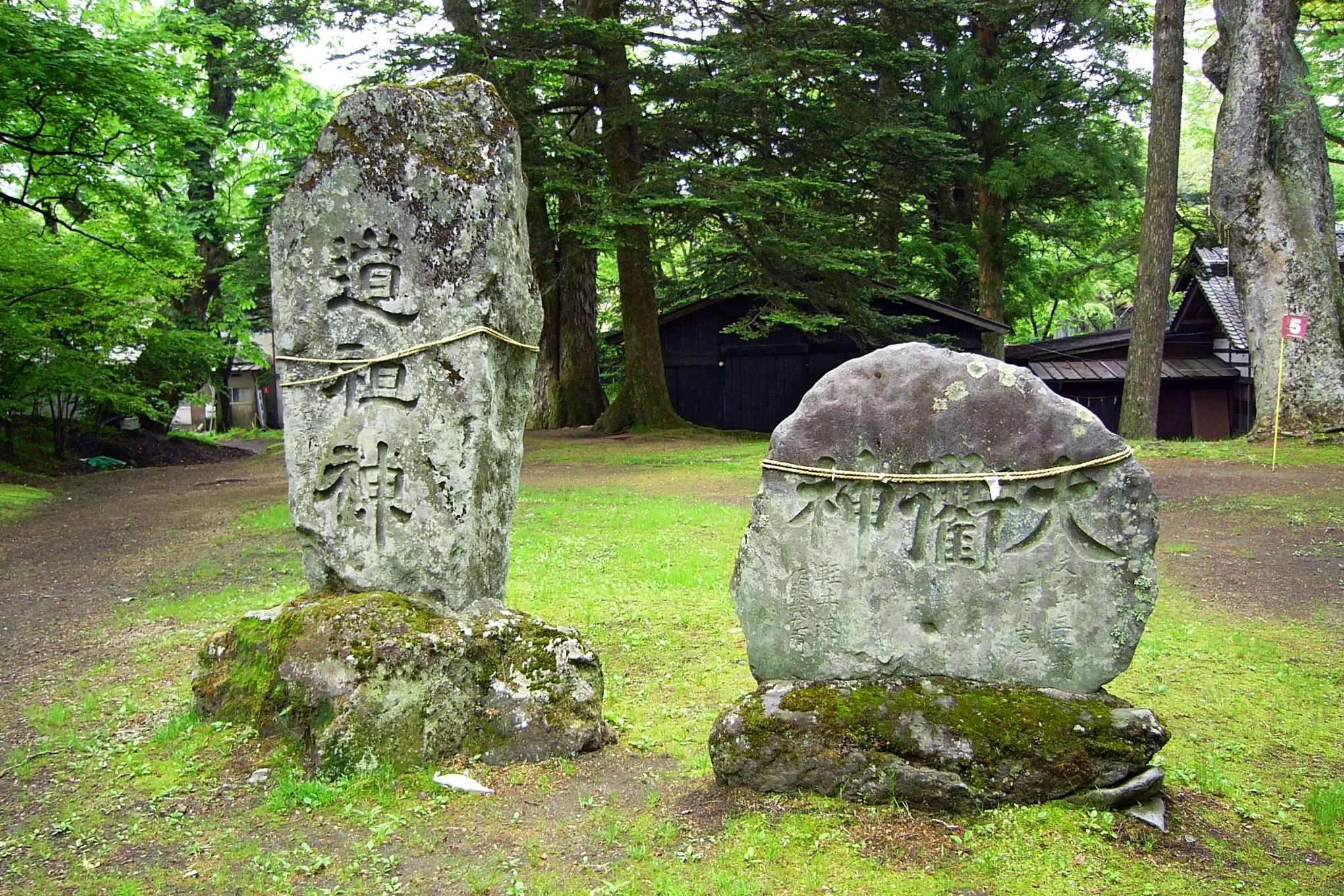
Shimenawa wrapped around Dōsojin: a pair of stone mounds in Karuizawa, Kitasaku District, Nagano Prefecture.

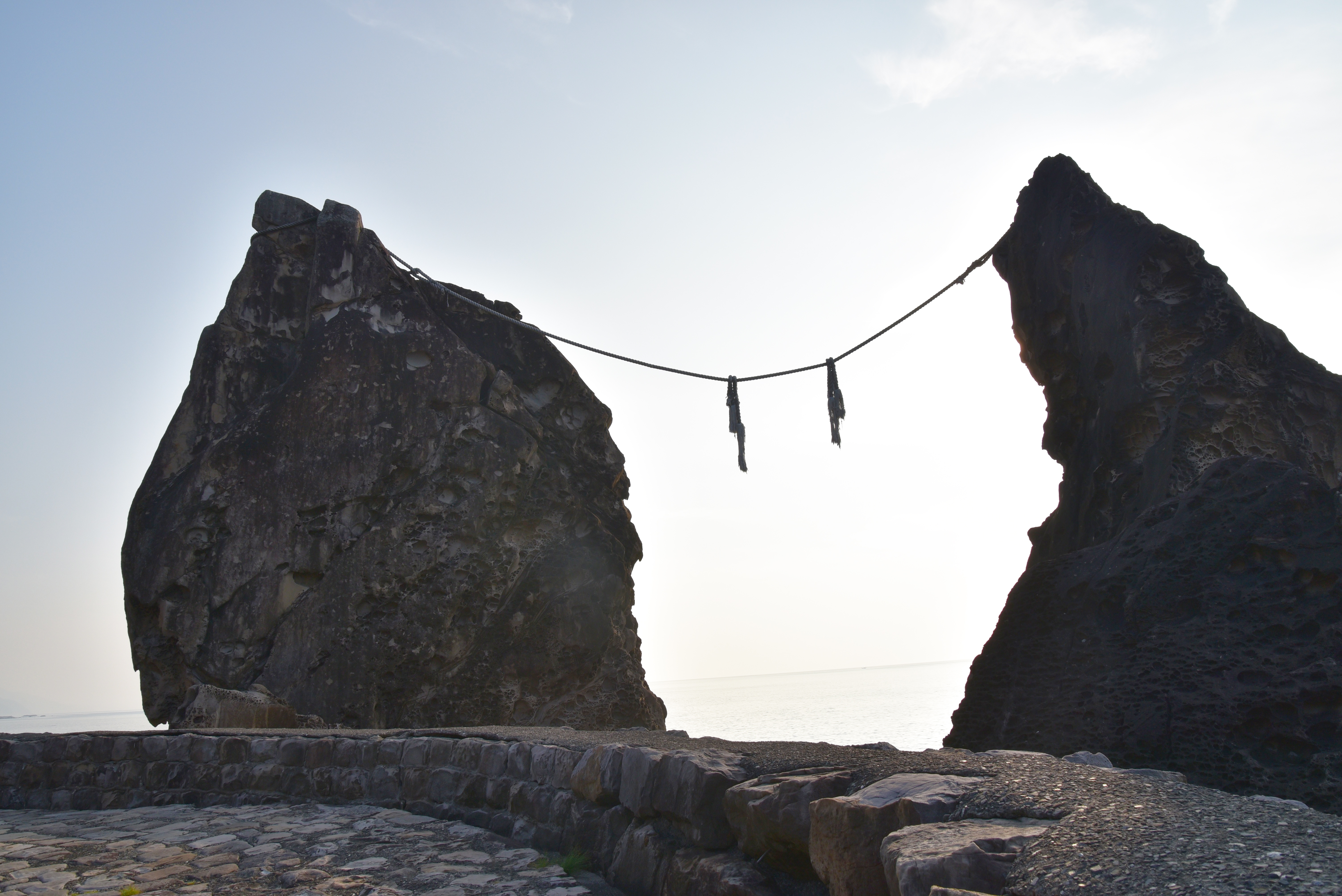
A couple rocks on the coastline, Muroto, Kōchi Prefecture.

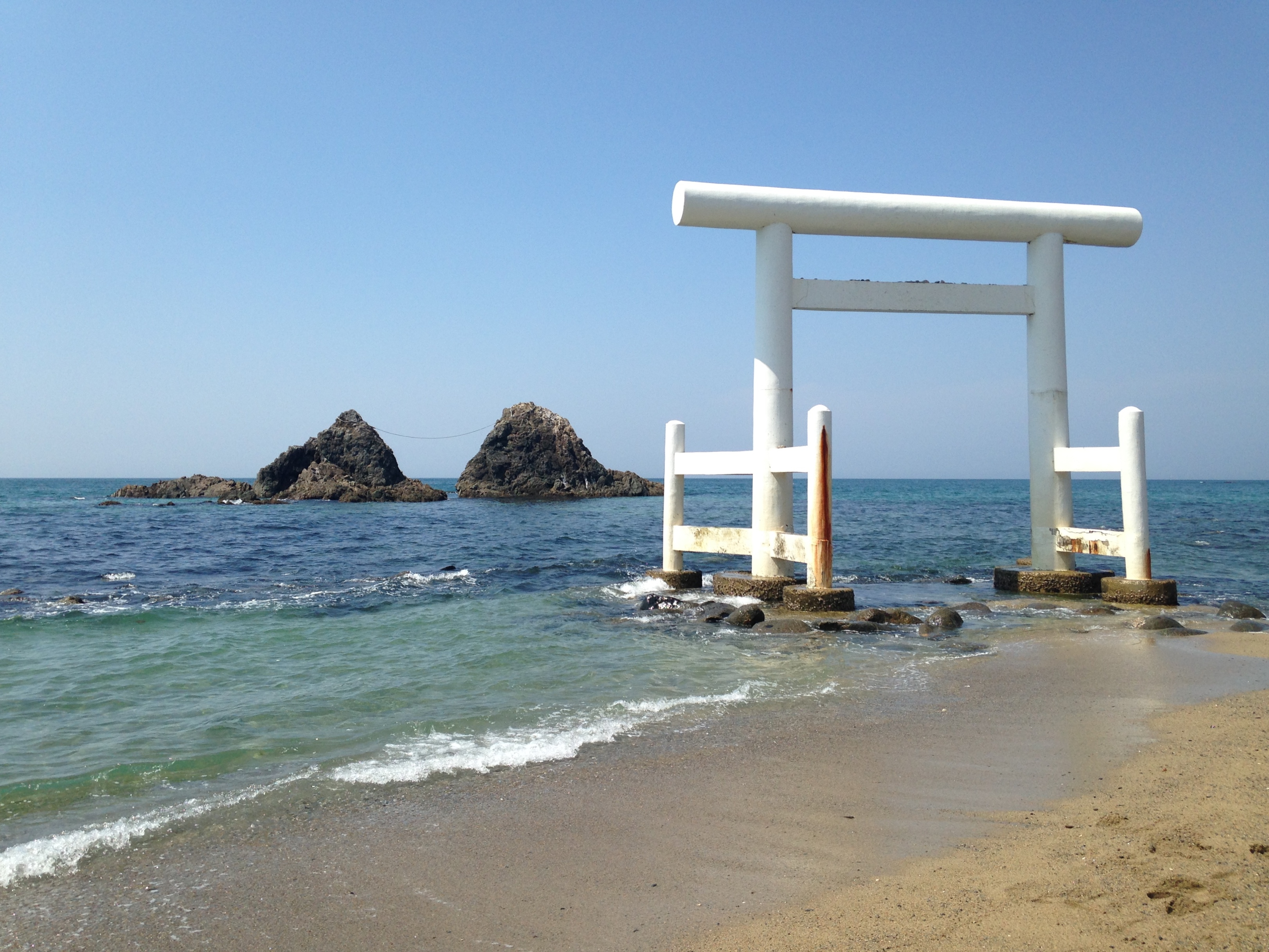
Futamigaura Couple Rocks, Itoshima, Fukuoka Prefecture.

=== Hokkaido Prefecture ===
- Oyakoiwa (parent and child rocks) in Samani, Samani District.
- Oyakoiwa, a couple rocks in Horokanai, Uryū District.
- Meotoiwa, a couple rocks in Kamifurano, Sorachi District.
- Meotoiwa (married couple rocks) in Wassamu, Kamikawa (Teshio) District.
- Fuufu Iwa couple rocks in Shari, Shari District.
- Meotoiwa couple rocks in Akkeshi, Akkeshi District.

=== Tohoku District ===
- Couple rocks in Kazamaura, Shimokita District, Aomori Prefecture.
- Meotoiwa in Nakadomari, Kitatsugaru District, Aomori Prefecture.
- Meotoiwa in Senmaya Town, Ichinoseki, Iwate Prefecture.
- Meotoiwa in Ninohe City, Iwate Prefecture; see Basenkyo for details.*
- Couple rocks in Kuji City, Iwate Prefecture, see Kosode Beach for more information.
- Meotoiwa in Sumita, Kesen District, Iwate Prefecture.
- Meotoiwa in Marumori, Igu District, Miyagi Prefecture.
- Couple rocks in Shirakawa, Fukushima Prefecture.

=== Kanto Region ===
- Meotoiwa in Nikko, Tochigi Prefecture.
- Couple rocks in Minakami, Tone District, Gunma Prefecture.

=== Chubu Region ===
- Couple rocks in Jōetsu, Niigata Prefecture.
- Hatagoiwa, also known as Noto Futami*, in Shika, Ishikawa Prefecture.
- Meotoiwa in Fukui, Fukui Prefecture.
- Meotoiwa in Wakasa, Mikatakaminaka District, Fukui Prefecture.
- Meotoiwa in Nakano, Nagano Prefecture.
- Couple rocks in Minamimaki, Minamisaku District, Nagano Prefecture
- Couple rocks in Ogawa, Kamiminouchi District, Nagano Prefecture.
- Meotoiwa in Nakatsugawa, Gifu Prefecture
- Couple rocks in Matsuzaki, Kamo District, Shizuoka Prefecture

=== Kinki Region ===
- Meotoiwa in Shima, Mie Prefecture.
- Meotoiwa in Higashiōmi, Shiga Prefecture.
- Meotoiwa in Takatsuki, Osaka Prefecture.
- Meotoiwa in Takarazuka, Hyōgo Prefecture.

=== Chugoku Region ===
- Couple rocks in Bizen, Okayama Prefecture.
- Meotoiwa in Takahashi, Okayama Prefecture.
- Meotoiwa in Etajima, Hiroshima Prefecture.
- Couple rocks in Higashihiroshima, Hiroshima Prefecture.
- Couple rocks in Shimonoseki, Yamaguchi Prefecture.
- Meotoiwa in Shūnan, Yamaguchi Prefecture

=== Shikoku Region ===
- Meotoiwa in Naruto, Tokushima Prefecture.
- Meotoiwa in Matsuyama, Kashima Island, Ehime Prefecture.
- Meotoiwa in Yawatahama, Ehime Prefecture.
- Meotoiwa in Kihoku, Kitauwa District, Ehime Prefecture.
- Meotoiwa in Kōnan, Kōchi Prefecture.
- Meotoiwa in Muroto, Kōchi Prefecture.
- Meotoiwa in Ōtoyo, Nagaoka District, Kōchi Prefecture.

=== Kyushu Region ===
- Meotoiwa in Yame, Fukuoka Prefecture.
- Meotoiwa in Itoshima, Fukuoka Prefecture.
- Couple rocks in Minami Ward, Fukuoka, Fukuoka Prefecture.
- Couple rocks in Shingū, Kasuya District, Fukuoka Prefecture.
- Couple rocks in Nagasaki, Nagasaki Prefecture.
- Meotoiwa, in Sasebo, Nagasaki Prefecture.
- Meotoiwa in Takeo, Saga Prefecture.
- Couple rocks in Arita, Nishimatsuura District, Saga Prefecture.
- Meotoiwa in Asagiri, Kuma District, Kumamoto Prefecture.
- Bungo Futami in Saiki, Ōita Prefecture.
- Meotoiwa in Kunisaki, Ōita Prefecture.
- Couple rocks in Kobayashi, Miyazaki Prefecture.
- Meotoiwa in Nakatane, Kumage District, Kagoshima Prefecture.

=== Okinawa Region ===
- Meotoze in Naha, Okinawa Prefecture.
- Mihugaru in Kumejima, Shimajiri District, Okinawa Prefecture.

== See also ==
- Futami-ga-ura, Mie
- Futami Okitama Shrine
- Kashima Island
- Bungo Futamigaura
- Imoseyama
