= Futamigaura, Fukuoka =

Coastline in Fukuoka Prefecture, Japan

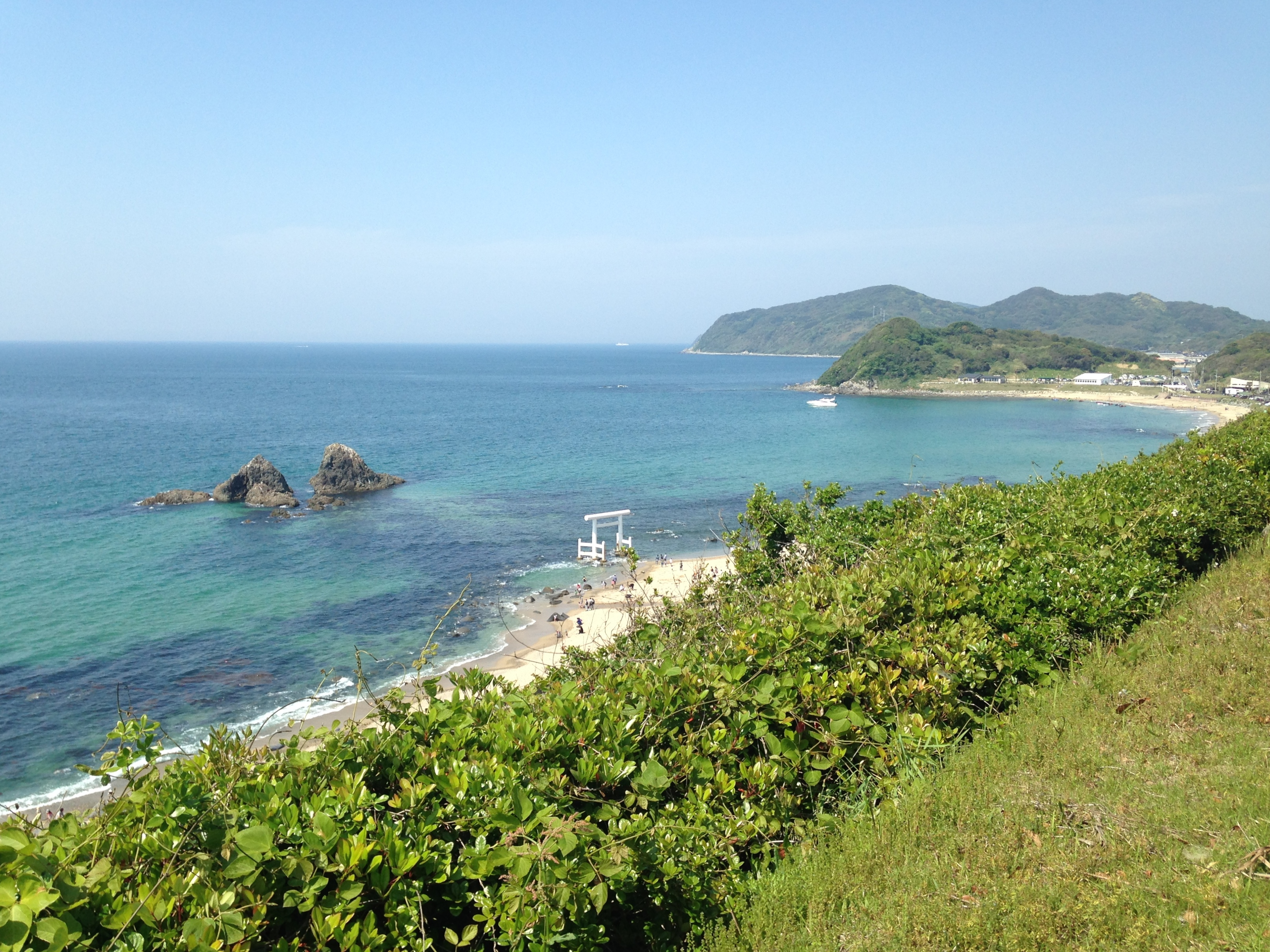
Futamigaura

Futamigaura (二見ヶ浦, Futamigaura), also known as Sakurai Futamigaura (桜井二見ヶ浦, Sakurai Futamigaura) and Chikuzen Futamigaura (筑前二見ヶ浦, Chikuzen Futamigaura) is a coastline spanning Itoshima and Fukuoka in Fukuoka Prefecture, Japan, and is part of Genkai Quasi-National Park.

Meoto Iwa is located about 150 meters off the coast of the northern Itoshima Peninsula. At Futamigaura, Izanagi and Izanami are enshrined at SSakurai hrine.

== Meoto Iwa ==
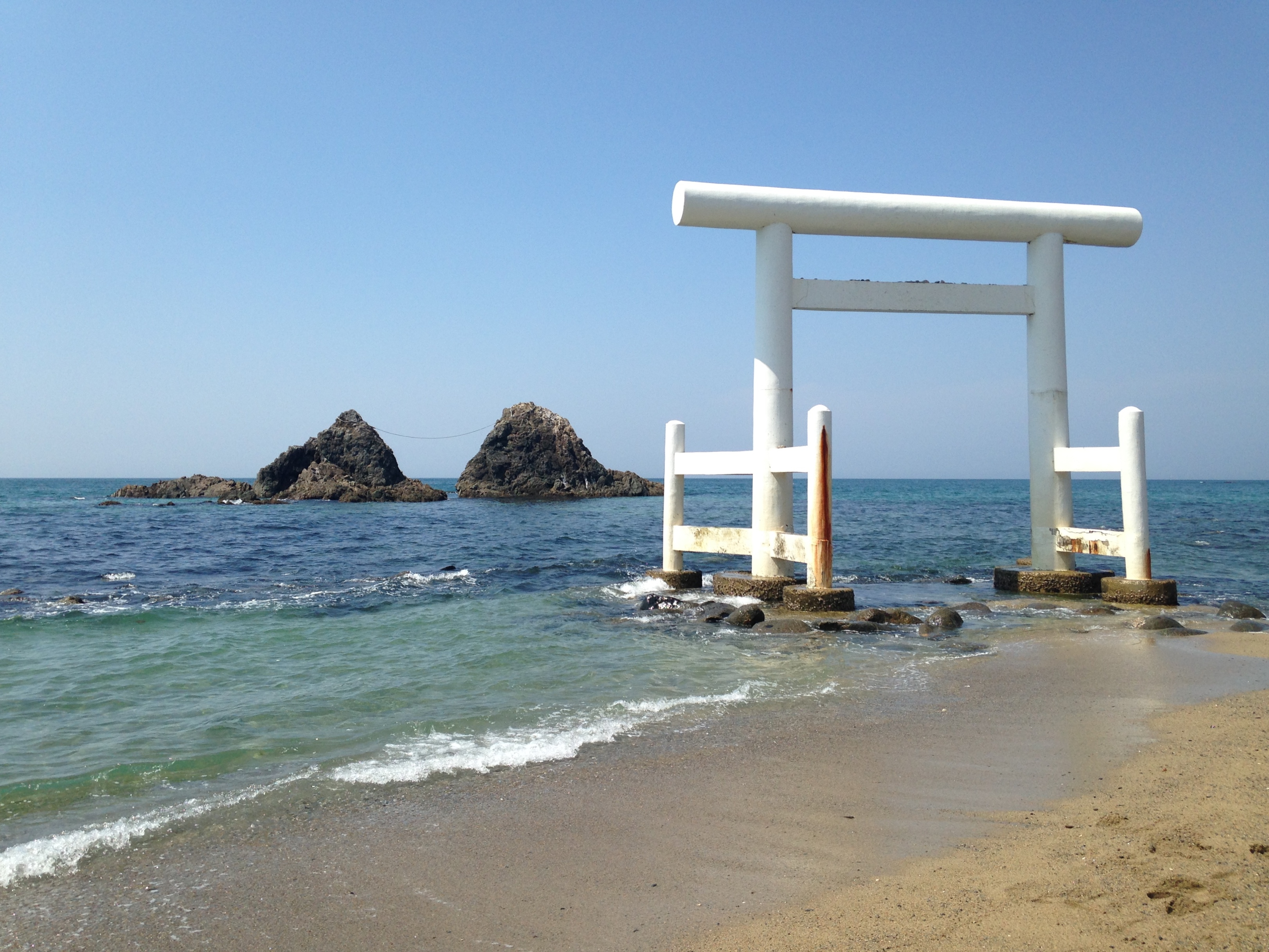
Meoto Iwa and Torii

A white torii gate stands in the sea in front of Meoto Iwa. The two rock formations, Man rock (11.8 m high) and Woman rock (11.2 m high), are connected by a large rope measuring 30 m in length and weighing 1 ton.
