= Shimenawa =

Lengths of laid rice straw or hemp rope used for ritual purification in Shinto

- しめ縄
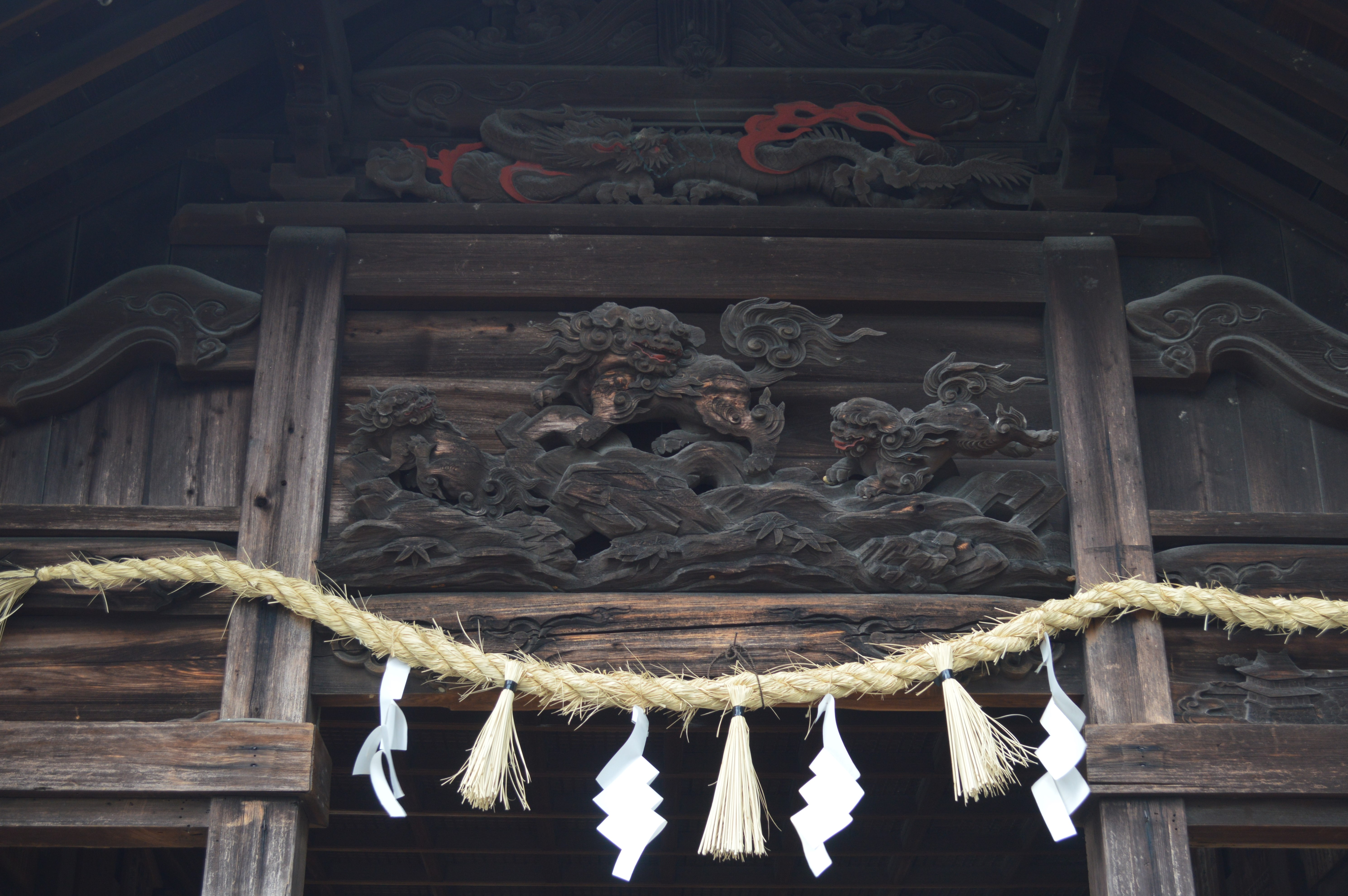
- Material: Hemp fiber/Straw
- Present location: Japan
- Culture: Shinto

Shimenawa (標縄/注連縄/七五三縄, lit. 'enclosing rope') are lengths of laid rice straw or hemp rope used for ritual purification in the Shinto religion.

Shimenawa vary in diameter from a few centimetres to several metres, and are often seen festooned with shide—traditional paper streamers. A space bound by shimenawa typically indicates a sacred or ritually pure space, such as that of a Shinto shrine. Shimenawa are believed to act as a ward against evil spirits, and are often set up at a ground-breaking ceremony before construction begins on a new building. They are often found at Shinto shrines, torii gates, and sacred landmarks.

Shimenawa are also placed on yorishiro, objects considered to attract spirits or be inhabited by them. These notably include being placed on certain trees, the spirits considered to inhabit them being known as kodama. Cutting down these trees is thought to bring misfortune. In the case of stones considered to be inhabited by spirits, the stones are known as iwakura (磐座/岩座).

A variation of the shimenawa are worn in sumo wrestling by yokozuna (grand champions), during the entrance ceremony to debut as grand champion rank. In this instance, shimenawa used by yokozuna are seen as being living yorishiro (a vessel capable of housing a spirit, known as shintai when inhabited by a spirit), and are therefore visually distinguished as "sacred".

== Shinto ==
Shimenawa originate in Shinto mythology as a hallowed sacrifice related to the Japanese gods called kami, and are used in various Shinto ceremonies. Aboriginal people in Japan have respected and revered shimenawa since ancient times.

=== Origin of shimenawa ===
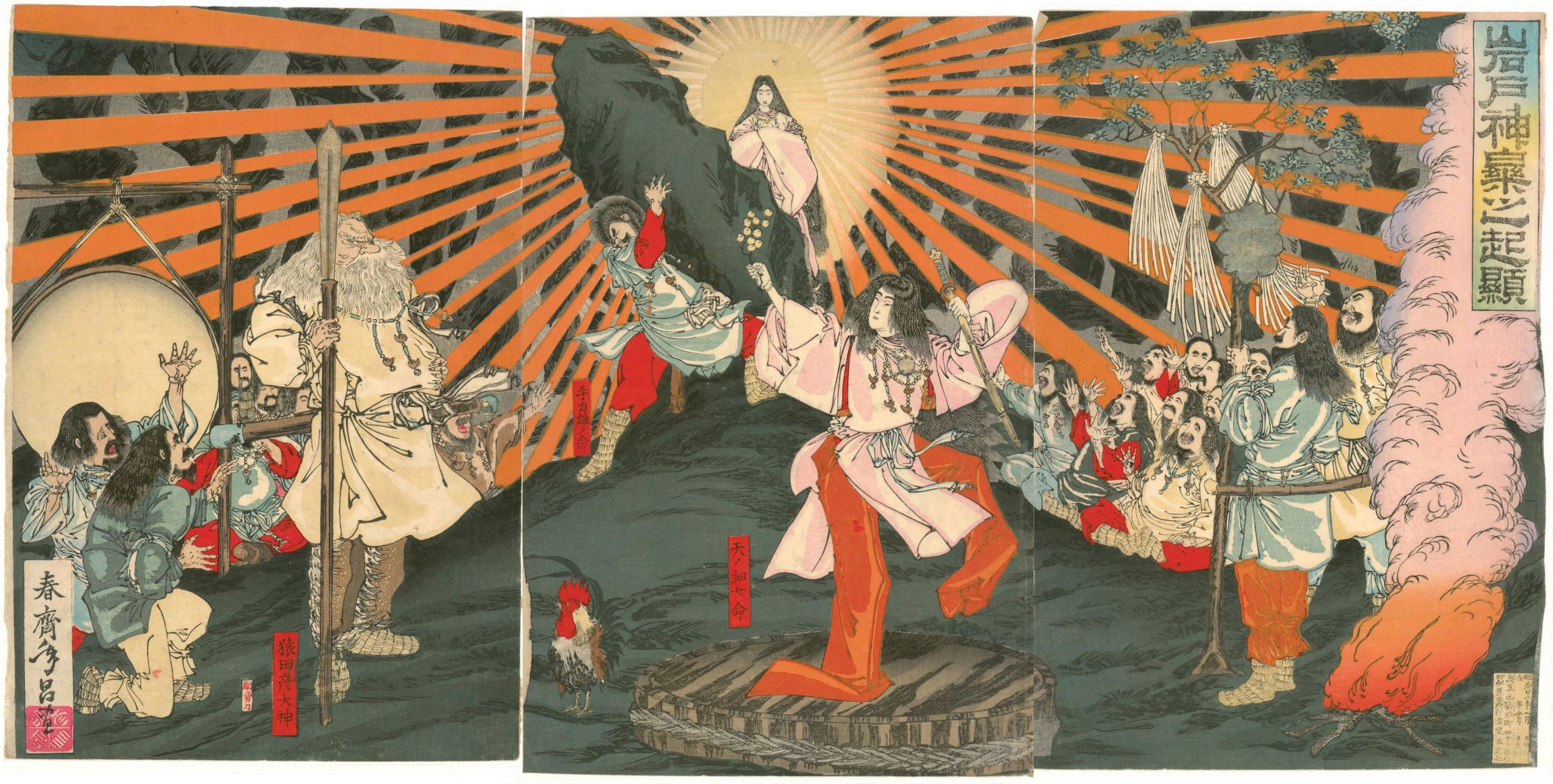
Amaterasu emerges from the Heavenly Rock Cave (Shunsai Toshimasa, 1889)

The prototype of shimenawa in Shinto is a rope of Amaterasu, Japan's "Heaven-shining great kami". According to "A popular dictionary of Shinto", Amaterasu hid in a cave called Amano-Iwato after an argument with her brother Susanoo. Therefore, the entire universe lost its luster. Other deities tried numerous ways to attract Amaterasu out of the cave. At the moment that Amaterasu left the cave, the kami Futo-tama used a magical rope that drew a line of demarcation between her and the cave, to avoid her returning to the cave. The rope became known as a shimenawa. Because of the shimenawa, the universe returned to its previous state.

=== Shinto shrines ===
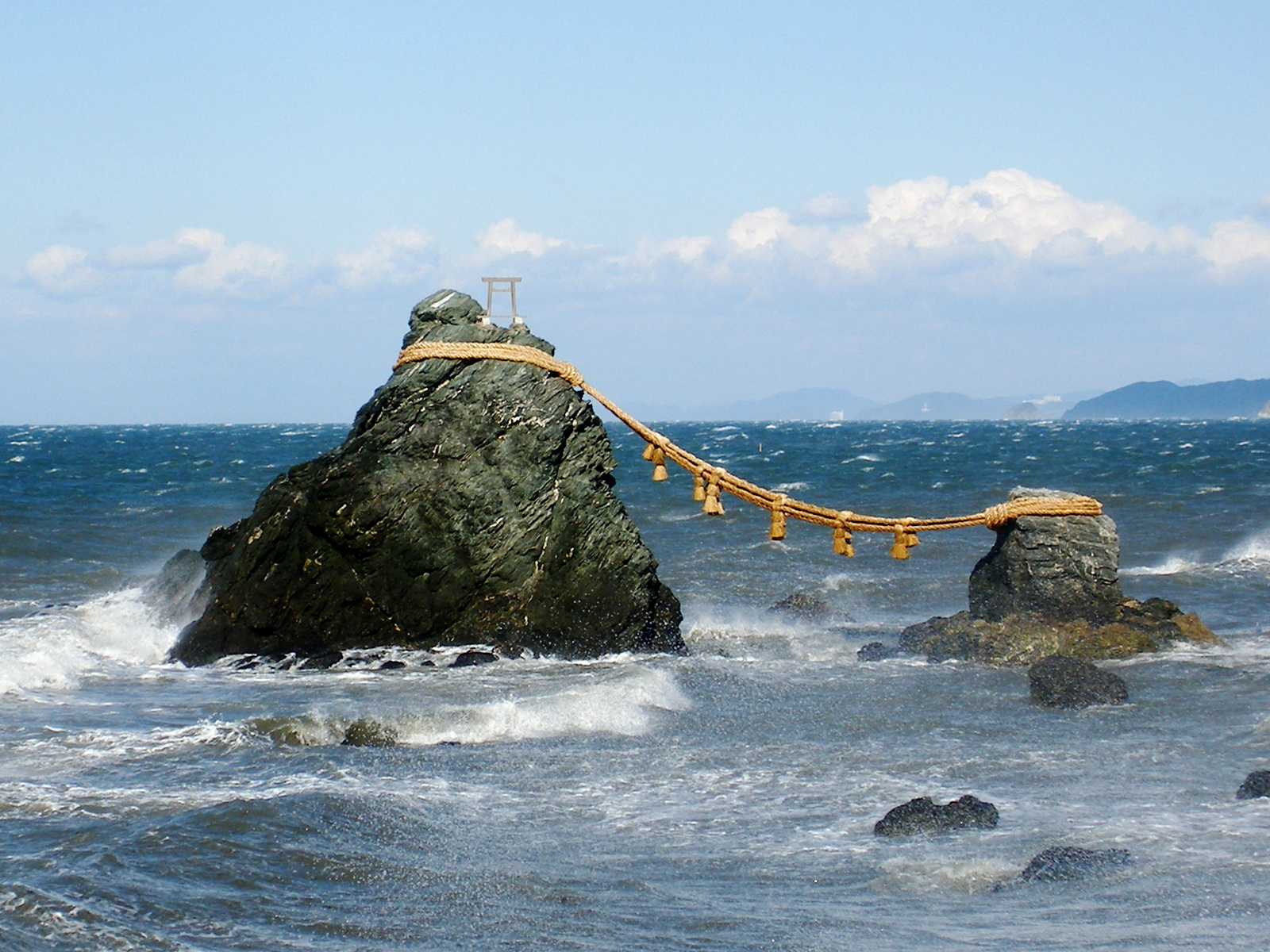
Meoto Iwa, two rocks in Ise Bay connected by shimenawa

Shimenawa and nature have been a hallmark of Shinto shrines since in early times. The shrine in Shinto is a place for kami. Local people held rituals in shrines. Early shrines were not composed of classical buildings, with rocks, plants and shimenawa instead marking their boundaries, as part of the Shinto respect for nature. In Shinto, all the sacred objects and nature were personified. Even a sword from a deceased Japanese warrior could be seen as the god because of its internal spirit and sense of awe. In modern-day society, there are still some sites that use shimenawa to demarcate boundaries, such as the Nachi Falls in Kumano. A rock in Ise Bay is still connected by shimenawa as well.

== Types ==
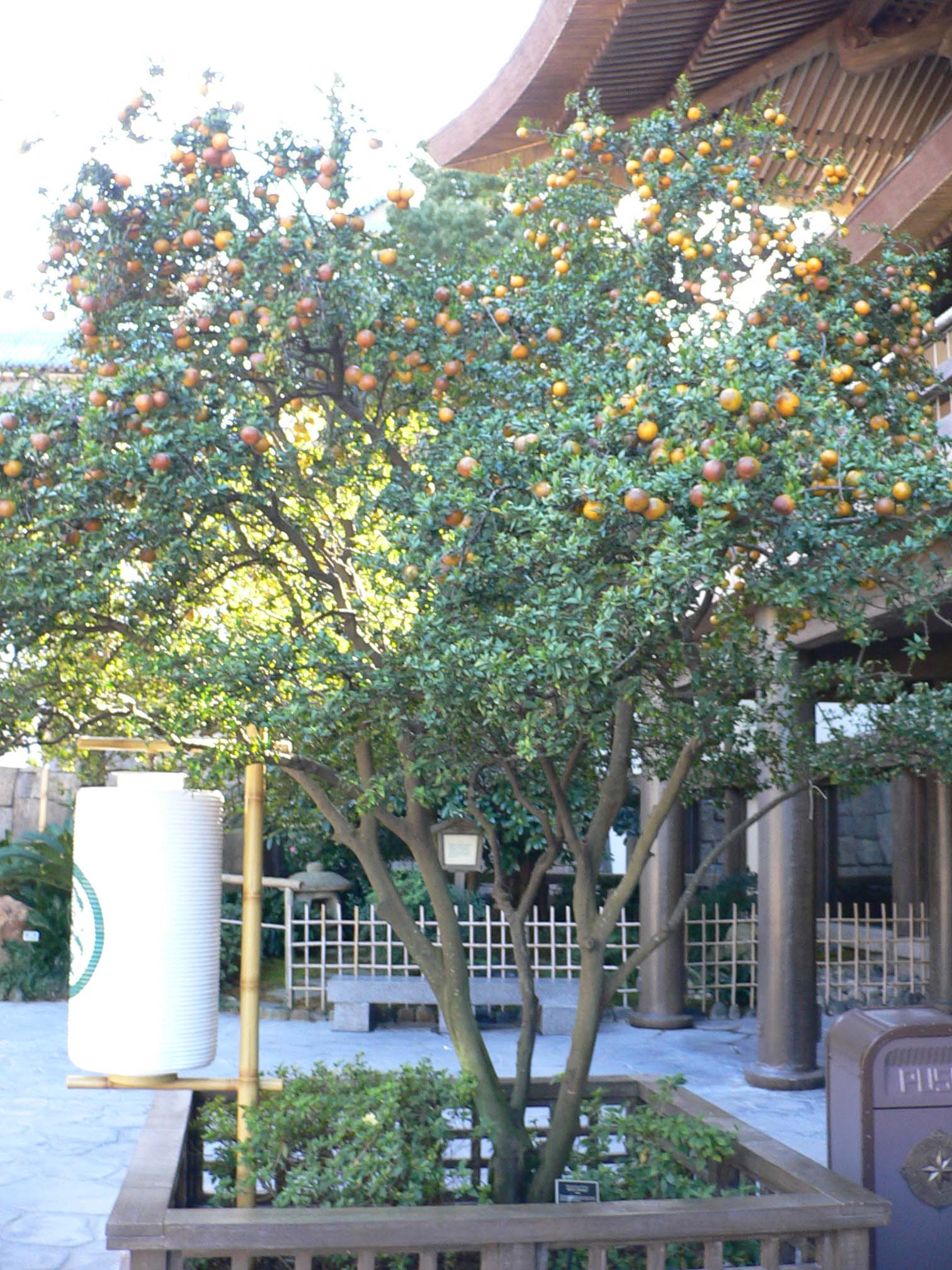
Daidai in Japan

Shimenawa usually appear in a shape similar to a twisted narrow rope with various decorations on it. Zig-zag paper and colorful streamers called shide commonly decorate shimenawa. The size of shimenawa differs from simple to complicated. In shrines, they are usually tapered and thick with a diameter of 6 ft (1.8 m).

=== Decorations ===
Shimenawa are decorated differently depending on the intended blessing and meaning.

- Daidai: a kind of bitter orange used to decorate shimenawa. This combination is seen to bring good fortune and prosperity.
- Gohei or shide: folded white paper which stands for lightning, a symbol of fertility.
- Pine twigs: using pine twigs to decorate shimenawa has a meaning of healthy growth for the next generation, as well as longevity of the elderly.

=== Biggest shimenawa in Japan ===
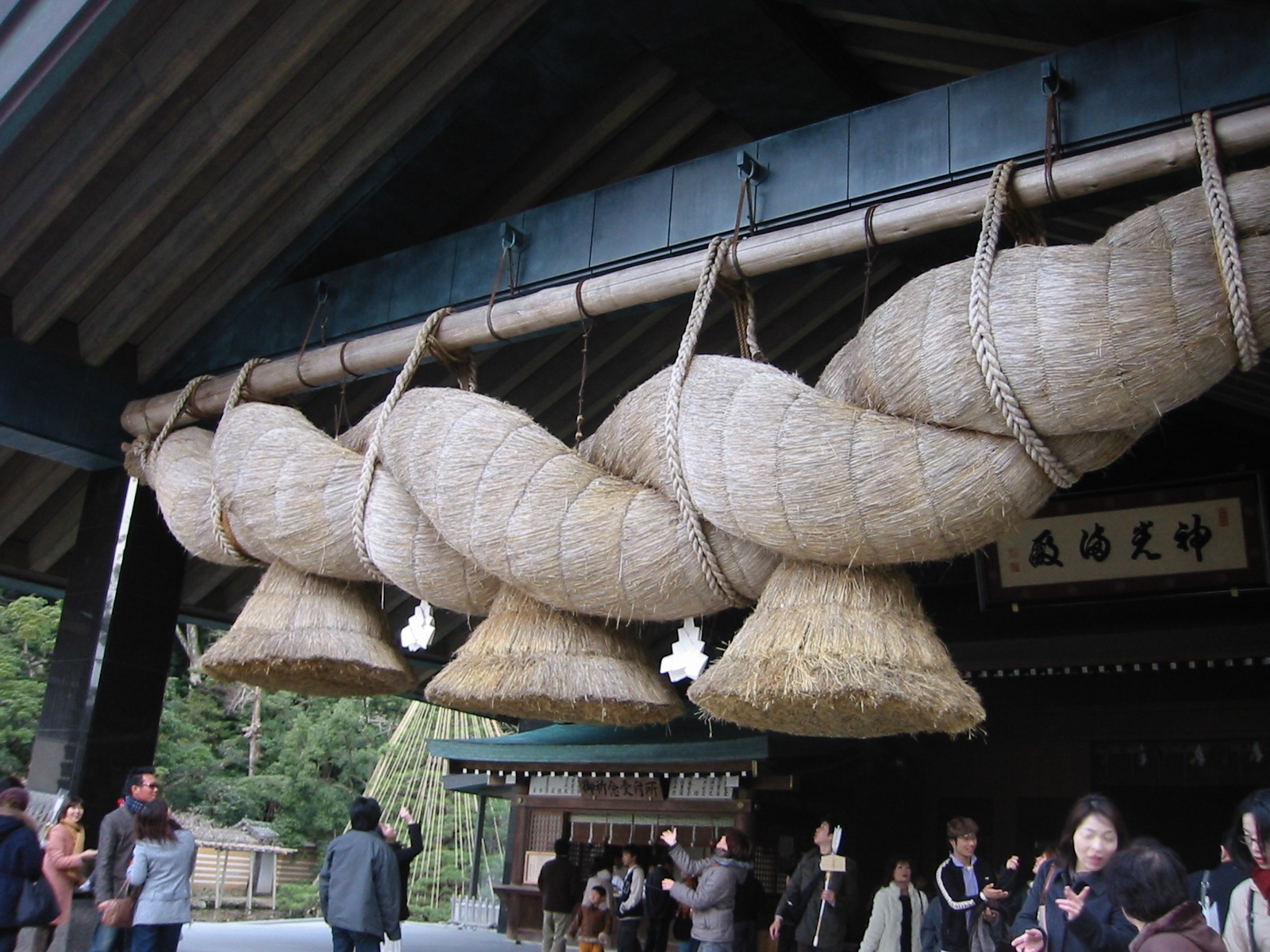
Japan's largest shimenawa at Izumo Taisha.

The biggest shimenawa in Japan is located at Izumo Taisha Grand Shrine, which occupies over 27,000 m^{2} (290,000 sq ft) of land in Japan. The shimenawa is 13.5 m (44 ft) in length and 8 m (26 ft) in width and was made by more than 800 indigenous people in Japan.

== Use ==
=== In Mountain Opening Ceremony ===
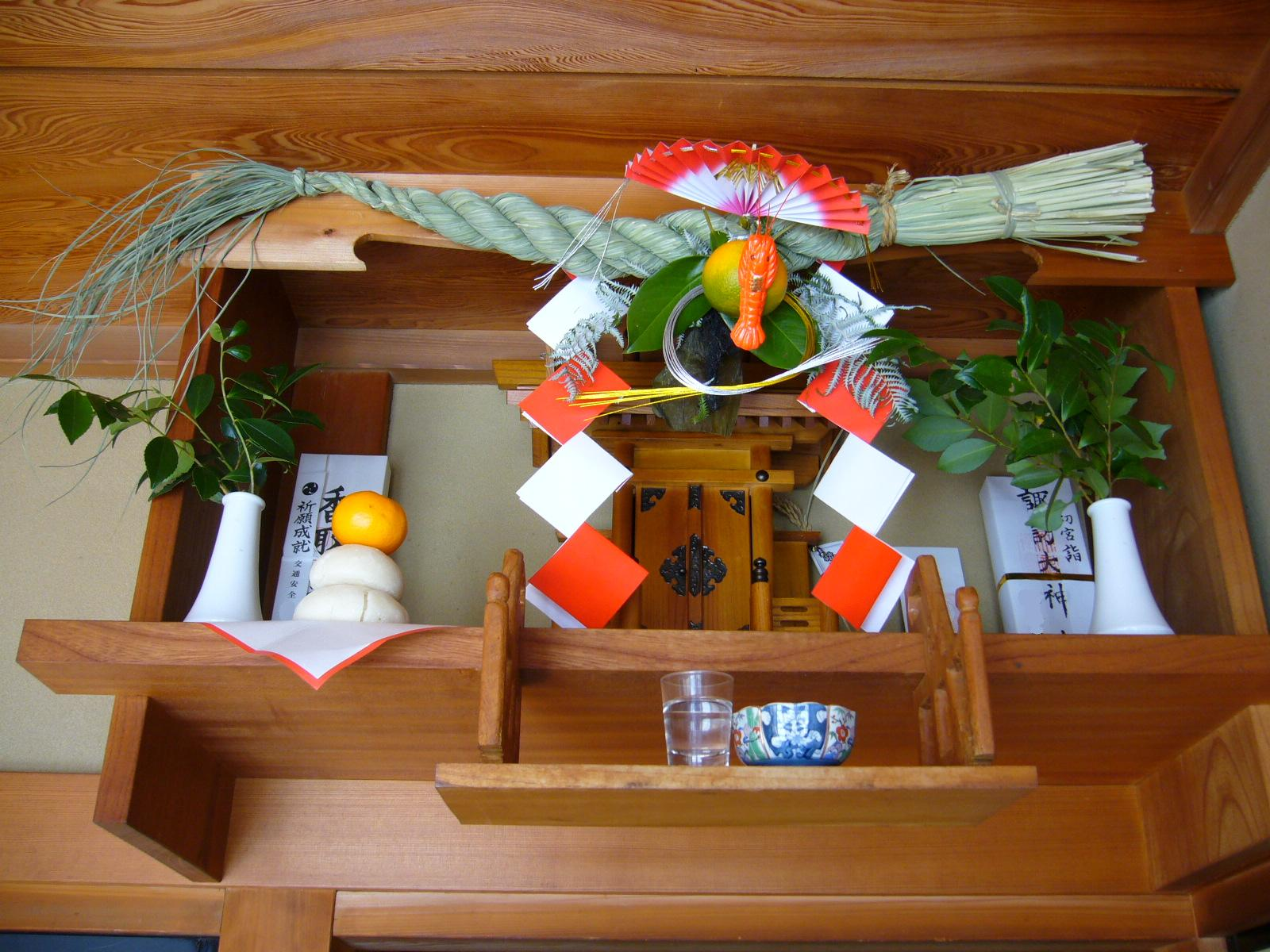
Sacred straw rope at New Year's (shimenawa), Katori City, Japan

Shimenawa are used in Japan's Mountain Opening Ceremony, which is held every May 1. There are over 100 Shinto believers who participate in this ceremony. It is a 2-hour journey that they climb from Akakura Mountain Shrine to Fudō Waterfall. The overall purpose is to carry the shimenawa and fix it between two towering trees. When the ceremony is finished, people get together and celebrate.

=== In New Year's Celebration ===
In Japan's New Year celebration, ornaments such as shimenawa decorate every household. During this time period, local residents usually hang it on the door in order to drive away evils.

==== Hadaka Matsuri ====
Shimenawa are used in Hadaka Matsuri, Japan's Naked Festival. This festival has been held during the New Year period for more than 500 years. The festival's participants, who are all young men, wear nothing but a fundoshi in cold weather in order to show their strength and manliness. It also includes various activities such as 'jostling, climbing fighting with a wooden ball' as well as being sprayed with water. Sometimes these festivals are held in Shinto shrines. The participants put shimenawa on the roof to wish them good luck for the upcoming year. Shimenawa are presented to the kami as a sacrifice in the shrine on New Year's day.

=== In sumo ===
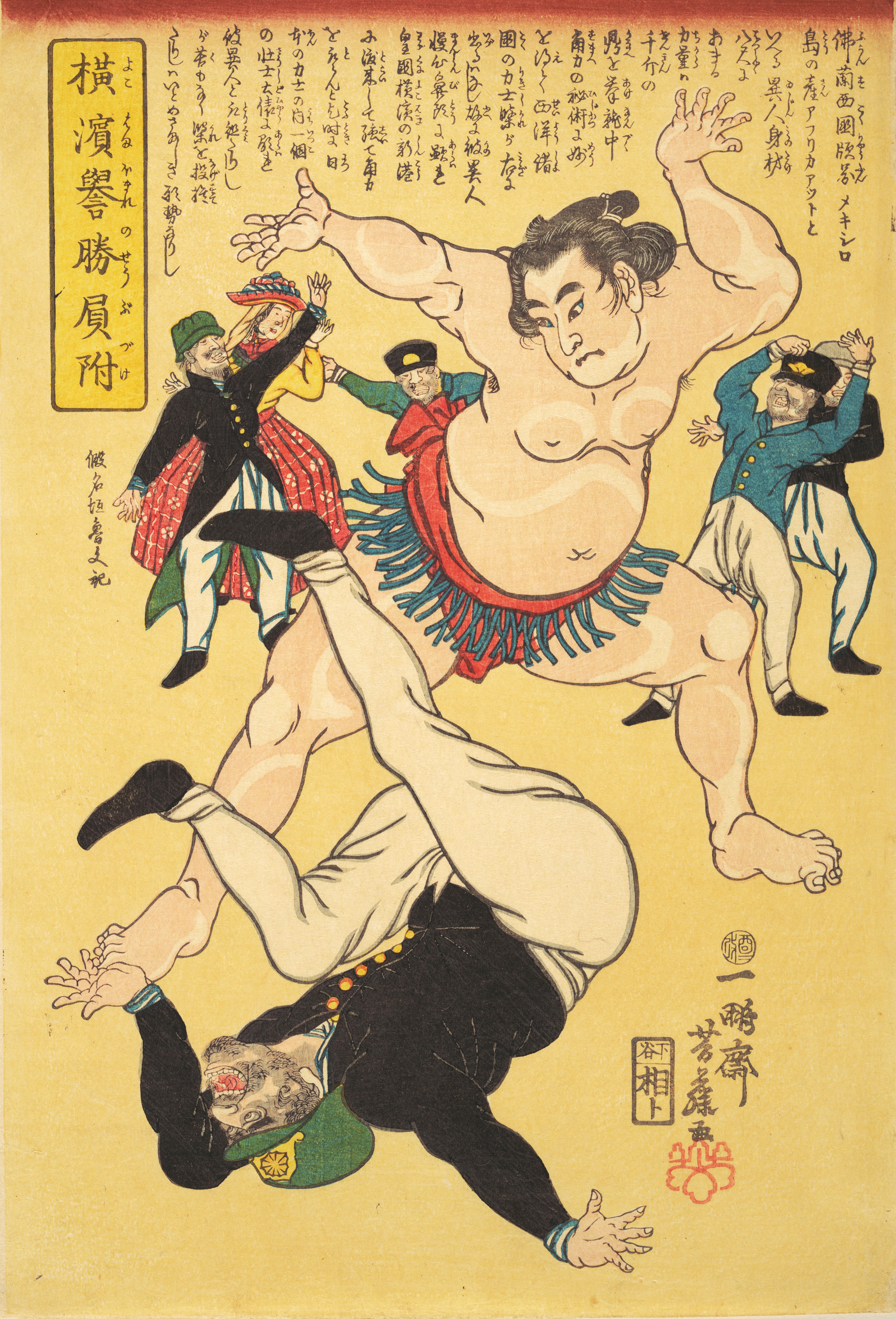
Sumo in 1861

Sumo, Japan's traditional national sport, still involves some elements of Shinto. Sumo matches are held in Shinto shrines, where the arena is demarcated by shimenawa. Moreover, the grand champion (whose name, Yokozuna, means "horizontal rope" and refers to the shimenawa) wears shimenawa around his waist when making his entrance to the ring in a ceremony called dohyo-iri.

== Construction ==
=== Material and preparation process ===
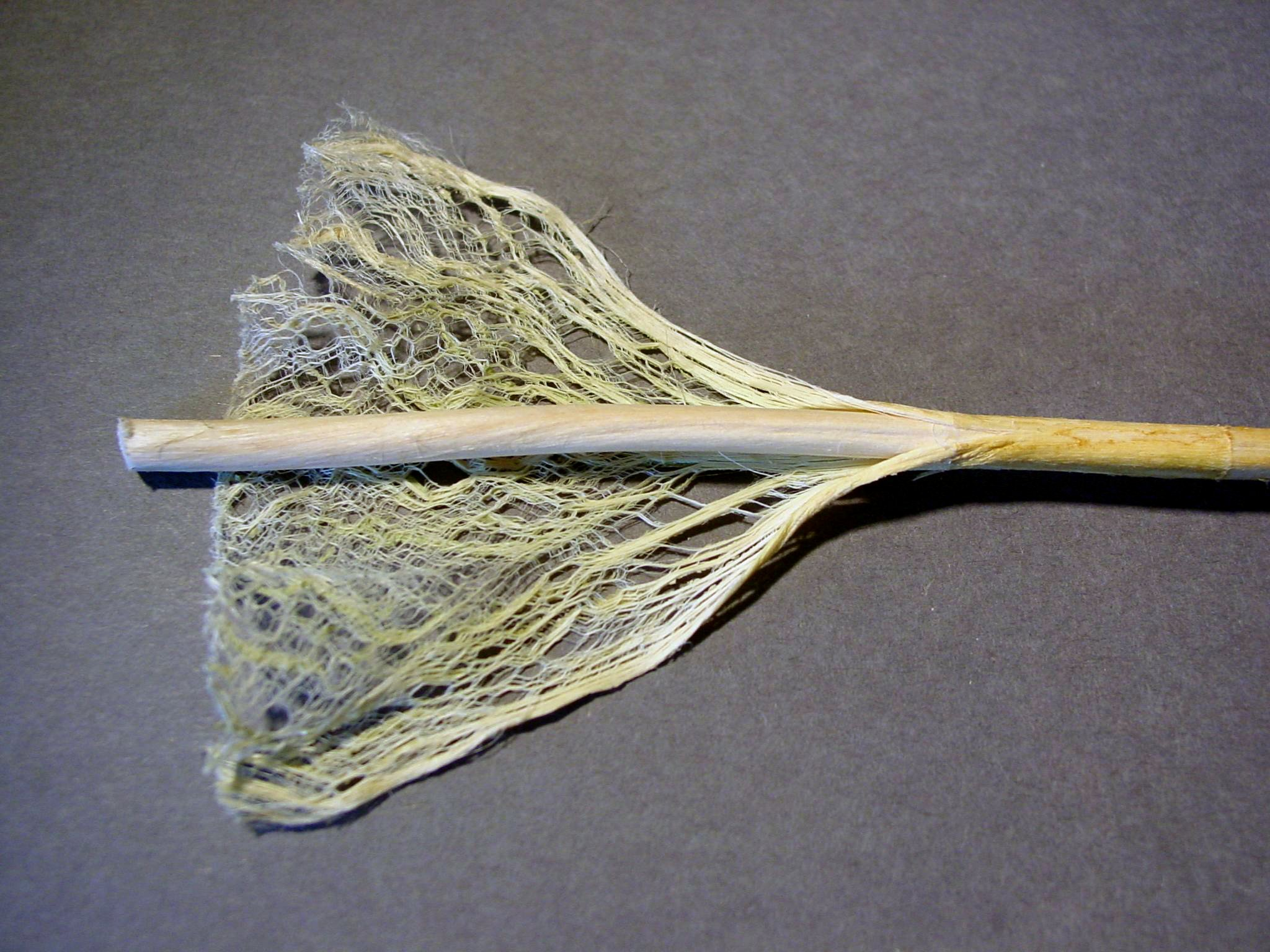
Hemp fiber to make shimenawa

Hemp fiber is the basic material used in the production of shimenawa, and has been used since ancient times. In Shinto, hemp is regarded as a sacred food with a meaning of purity and fertility. After the Cannabis Control Act of 1948, when the growing of hemp was banned, straw began to be used instead as the raw material of shimenawa. During the process of production, the straw stems are harvested between 70 and 80 days of growth, as beyond this, the quality of the fibre decreases as the plant starts to produce its seeds. After the shimenawa straw is collected by machine, it is heated for more than 10 hours, to avoid the stems being dried by the sun. The best stems are then chosen by hand in order to create shimenawa.

== Related objects ==
=== Heihaku ===
Heihaku (also called mitegura or heimotsu), a vertical wooden stick decorated with shide, cloth or metal called gohei, usually in red or white, which is used priests in Shinto. People put heihaku in front of honden doors. In a procession called shinkō-shiki , heihaku are seen as a sacrifice for the gods or a symbol of the existence of the gods. In ancient times, people offered cloth to the Shinto shrines, similarly to today's processions. Heihaku are also sometimes used in the way shide are. The stripes can also hang on the shimenawa.

=== Himorogi ===
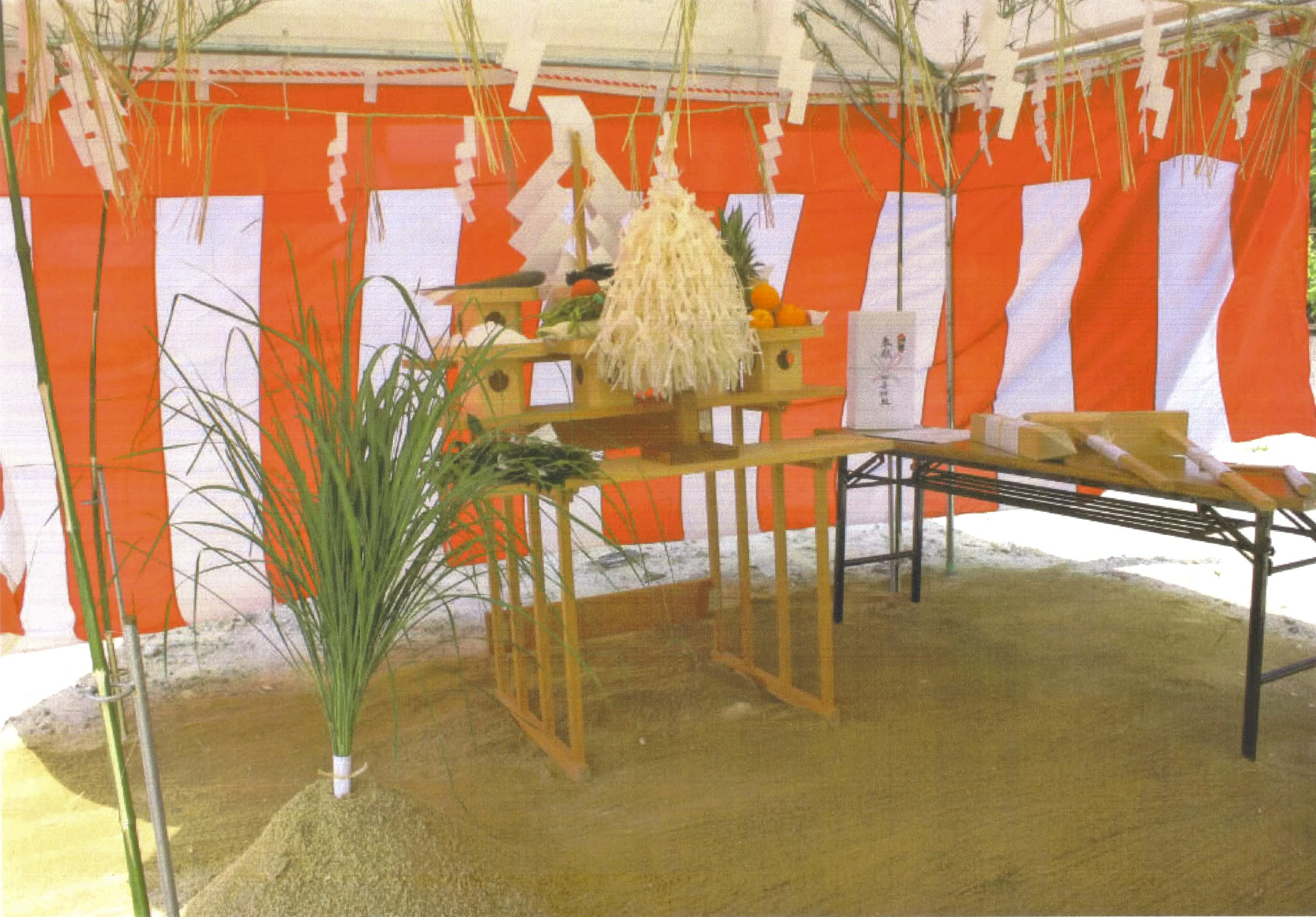
Himorogi in Japan

Himorogi are the sacred spaces delimited by shimenawa, which sometimes feature a cherry blossom tree surrounded by green plants appears, symbolising the seat of the gods.

=== Kazari ===
Like shimenawa, kazari are also a New Year's decoration in Japan, consisting of a shimenawa decorated with items related to rice like rice-cakes. The purpose of the kazari is to bring good fortune to people.

=== Kamidana ===
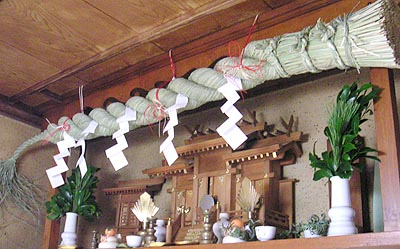
Kamidana

Kamidana are household altars. They are sometimes decorated with a smaller shimenawa, while rice, salt, and water are often used as offerings. They can appears in business areas such as restaurants as well as conventional industries. Places like the police stations and board ships will also feature kamidana.

=== Raijin ===
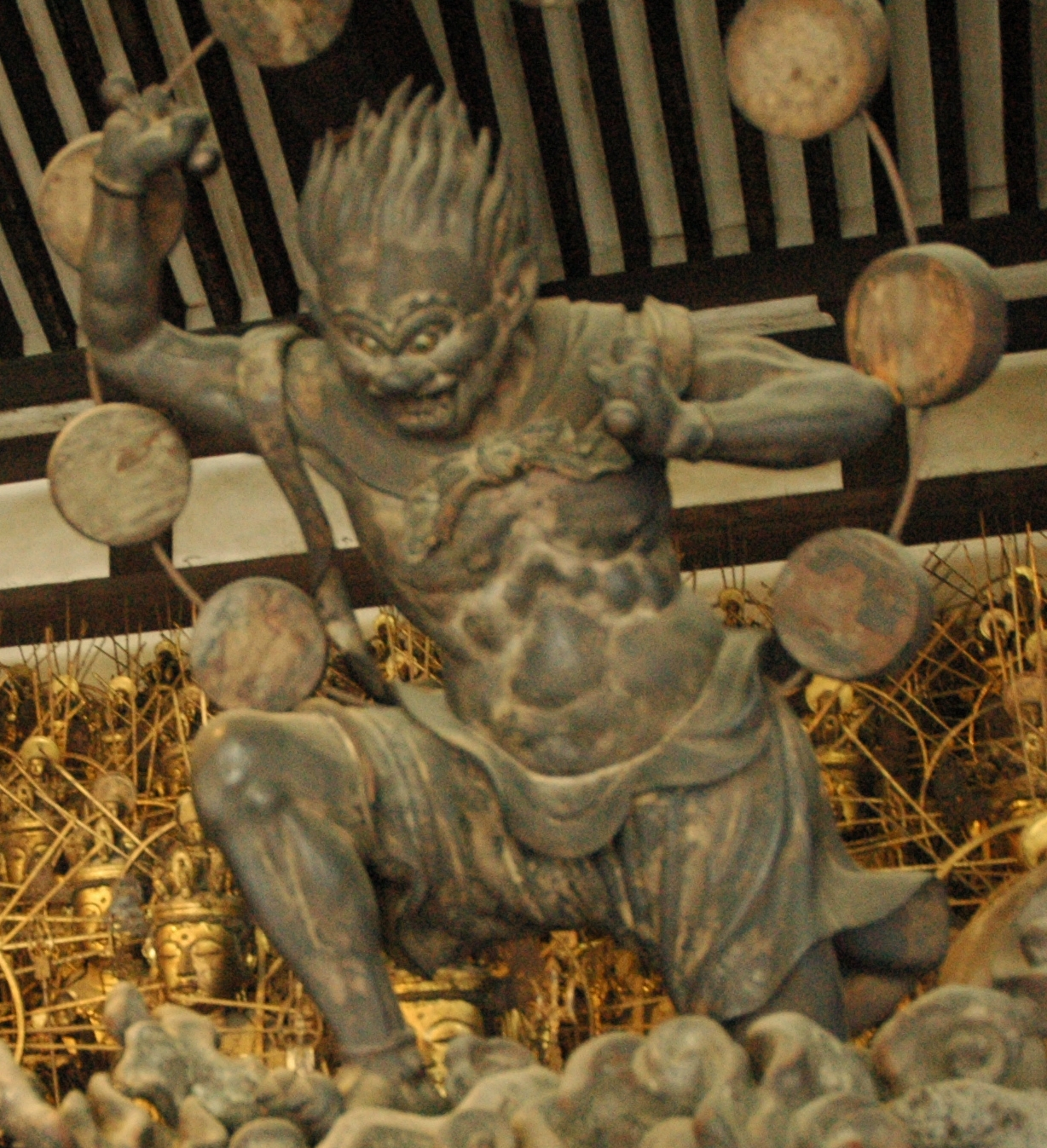
Raijin

Raijin is the kami of thunder who also has power over drought. According to "A popular dictionary of Shinto", there is a custom in Japan which talks about shimenawa and Raijin. Local residents in Japan's Kantō area put a shimenawa between green bamboo after a bolt of lightning appears on the planted rice field out of gratitude to Raijin.

=== Shinboku ===
A shinboku is a sacred tree located in a Shinto shrine sometimes indicated by shimenawa. It also be seen as a god's shintai. These trees surrounding the shrine are seen as part of the shrine itself.

=== Torii ===
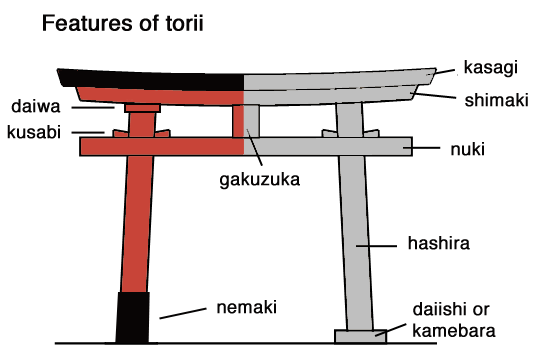
Features of torii

Torii are an archway composed of two round posts and two upper cross-beams. The ends of the cross-beams are typically curved, which is a symbol of a style called myōjin. There is an under-cross-beam just below the top individually.

Torii first appeared in Japan at the time Chinese culture and Buddhism were introduced, though their exact origin, including the origin of their shape and name, is unknown; some researchers believe the name torii to have originally come from Sanskrit.

With the exception of the cross-beams, people also use shimenawa to decorate torii. The type of torii using only shimenawa as cross-beams is known as shimenawa torii, which consist of only two posts and a shimenawa; these torii are intended to be temporary instead of permanent.

In Japan, there are more than 20 different kinds of torii, varying from simple wood constructions to those made of concrete gates, typically used as gates to Shinto shrines. The style of torii is not strictly based on the style of shrine, and there could be more than one style of torii in one shrine.

Similar to shimenawa, torii also have meaning in Shinto, representing a gate to the world, people, or any relationship. The purpose of torii and shimenawa is the same, in bringing lost people to the kami-filled world.

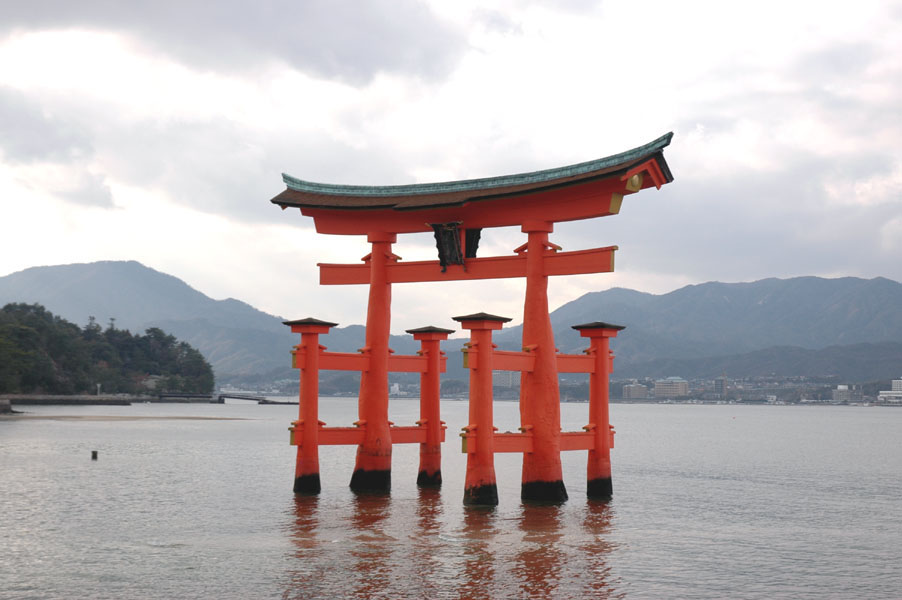
Torii of Temple Itsukushima

== In art ==
During the 2017 Yokohama Triennale, Indonesian artist Joko Avianto's artwork, "The border between good and evil is terribly frizzy", was displayed in the center of the hall in the Yokohama Museum of Art. The name, taken from the quote "The border between good and evil is terribly fuzzy" by Czech novelist Milan Kundera, changed 'fuzzy' to 'frizzy' because of the twisted, shimenawa-inspired shape of his artwork. Avianto took the meaning of shimenawa to separate 'the sacred and the profane', or 'the ideal and the secular', as inspiration in his work, using it to symbolise the boundary between 'the earth and heaven'.

== In Zoology ==
Shimenawa okuyamae Bassi & Iryu, 2026: this species of tubular foraminifer found in the Ryukyu Islands is named in honour of Okuyama Shinobu, secretary of the Department of Earth Science (Graduate School of Science), Tohoku University (Sendai, Tohoku, Japan), for her continued support for the collaborative research between the University of Ferrara (Italy) and Tohoku University.

== Shimenawa production in Taiwan ==
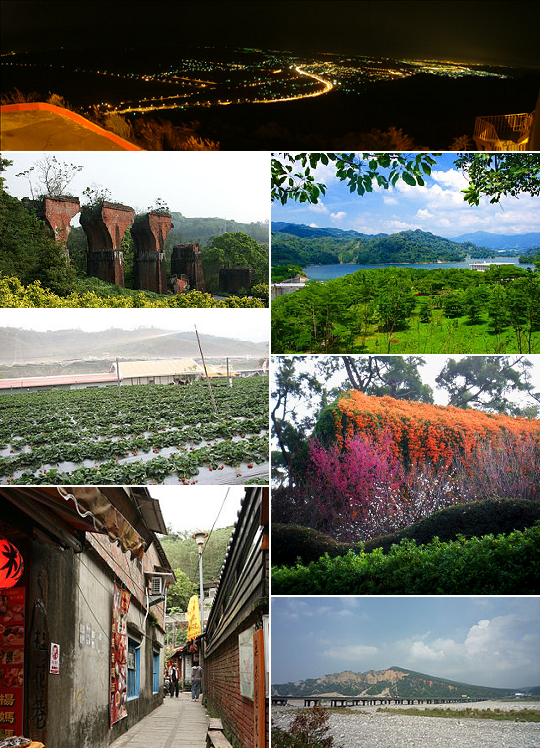
Miaoli County in Taiwan

Taiwan's Miaoli County began to produce shimenawa for export to Japan in 1998. In the late 1990s, Japanese manufacturers visited Taiwan and found the high quality of straw as well as the relatively low cost of producing it. However, as there were no local residents who knew how to make shimenawa, the Japanese started to provide free classes for them to study the skills for producing shimenawa. The shimenawa industry in Taiwan developed rapidly, with many large shimenawa factories appeared in Taiwan in the late 1990s. However, due to industrial disruption, most factories were forced to shut down a few years later, and only one factory was left to continue production. Other remaining factories chose to hand over the work to other Southeast Asian countries, particularly Vietnam, for a lower cost production. Later in 2005, a large number of shimenawa orders were transferred back to Taiwan because buyers in Japan found that the quality of shimenawa produced in Vietnam was poorer compared to those produced in Taiwan.

The craftsmen in Taiwan harvest the straw to make shimenawa, while Japanese manufacturers provide samples or finished products to the customers according to their orders.

== Image gallery ==
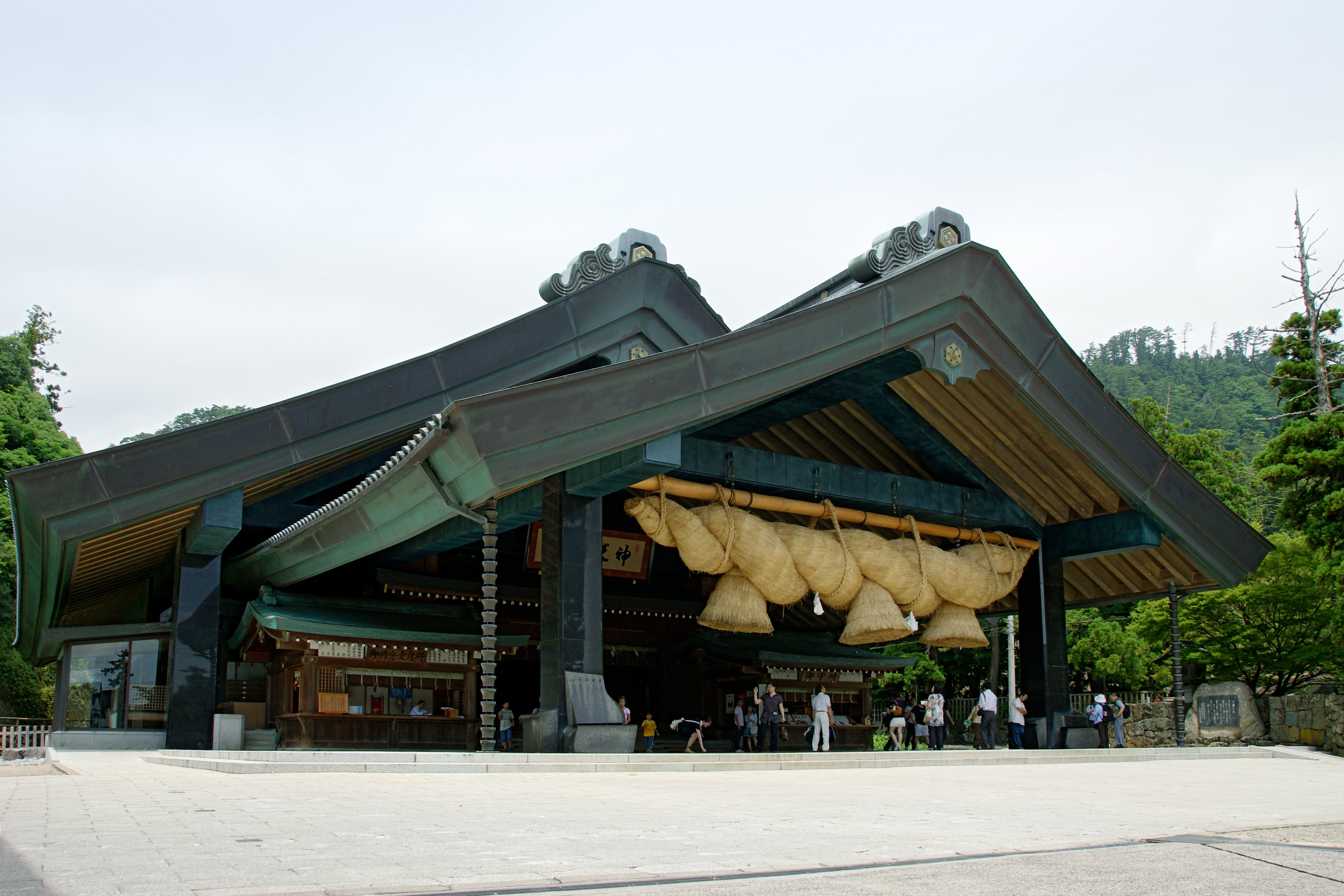

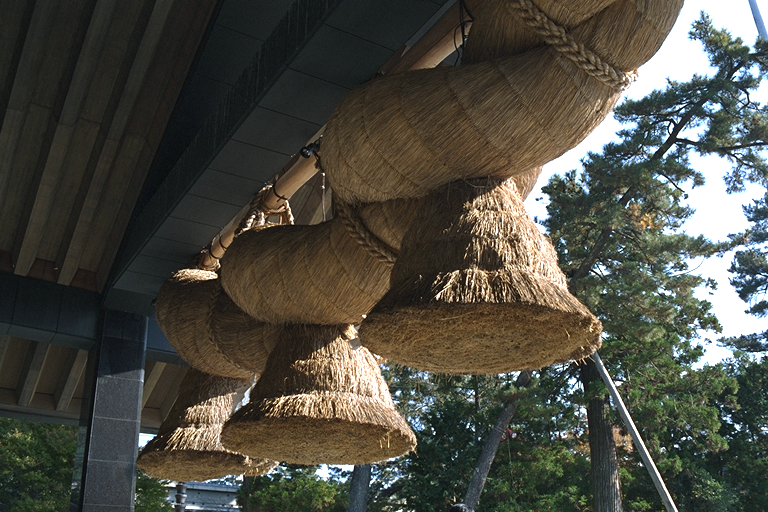

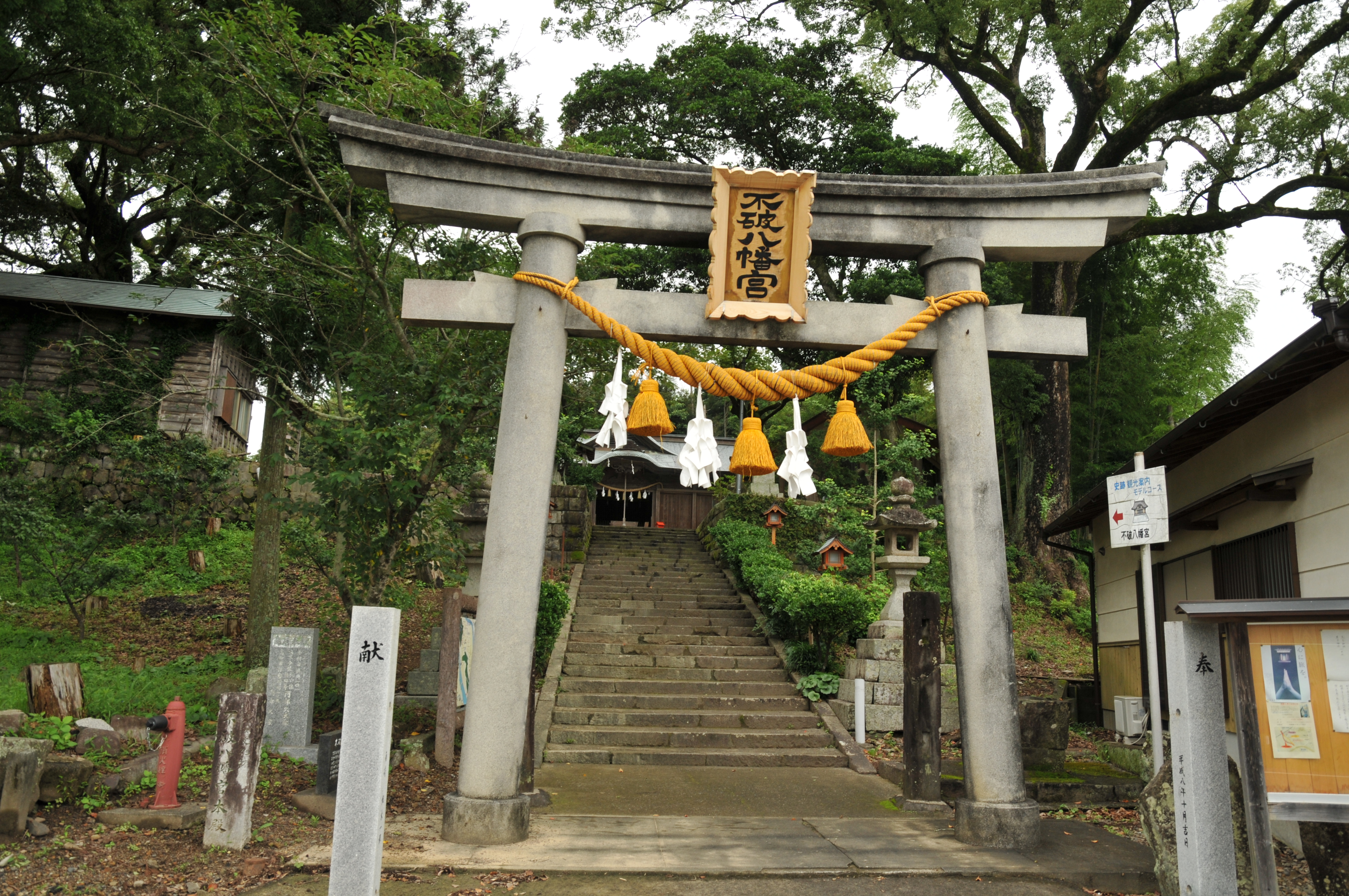

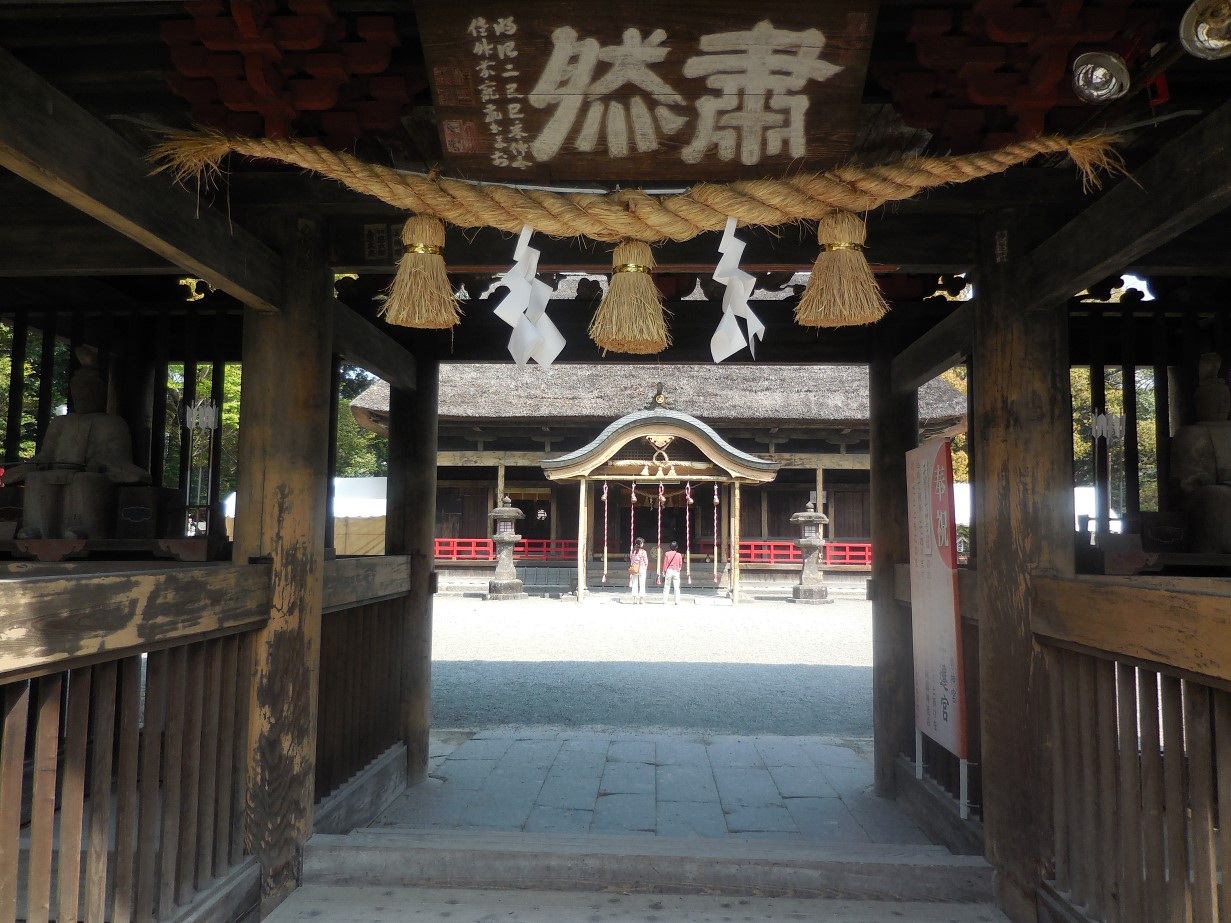

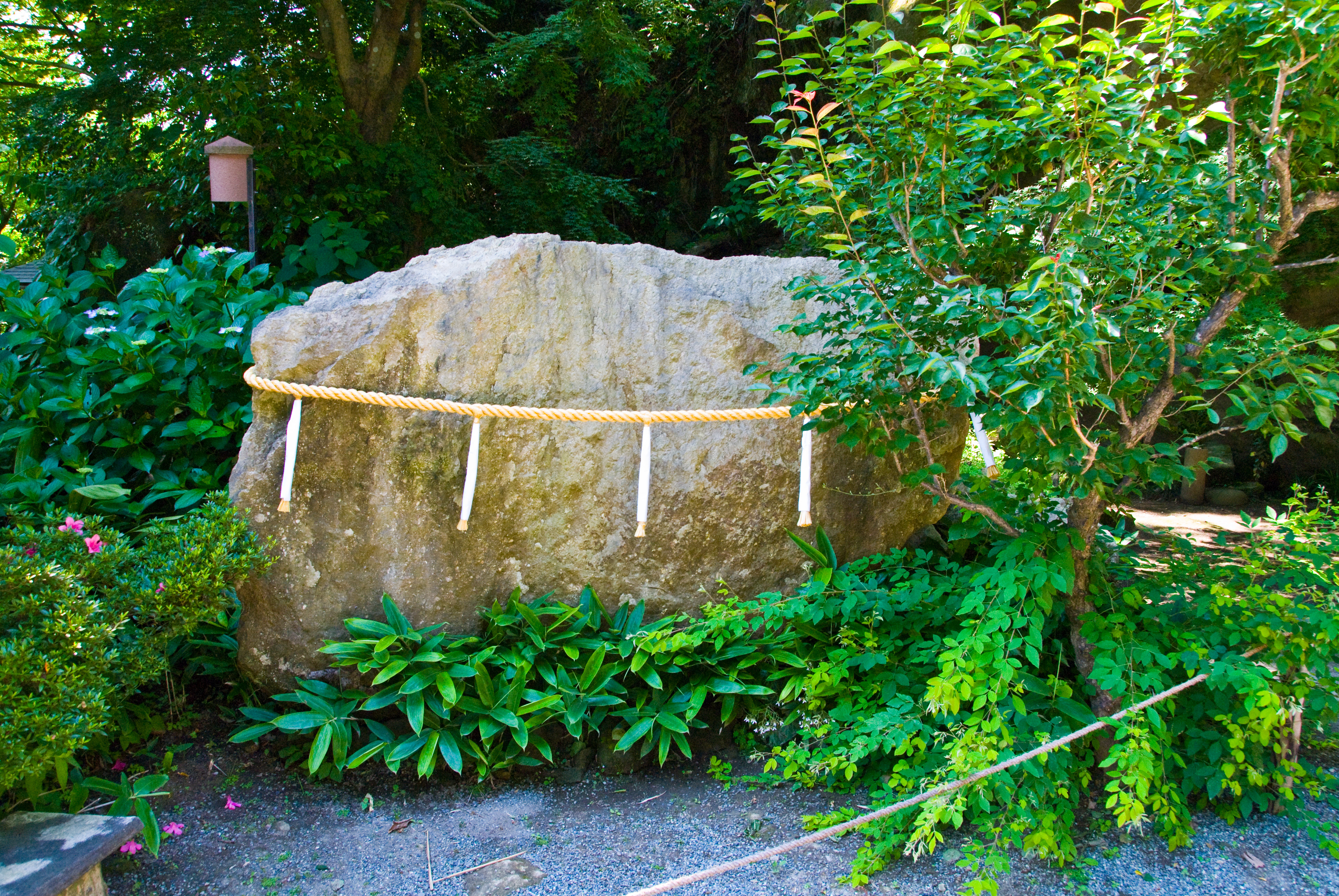

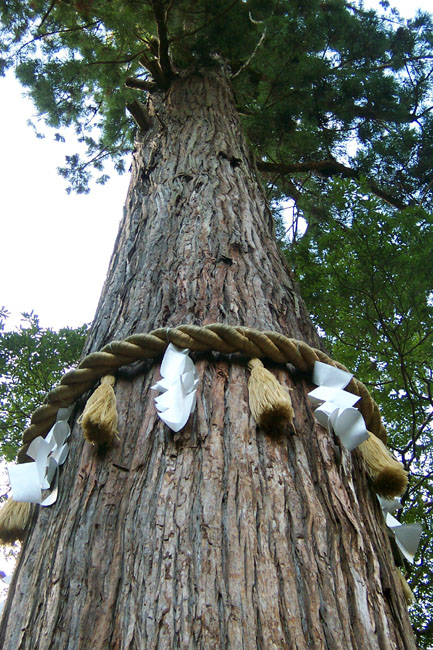

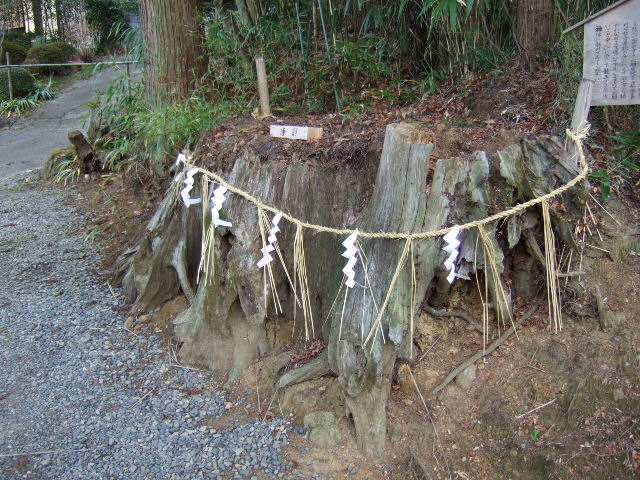

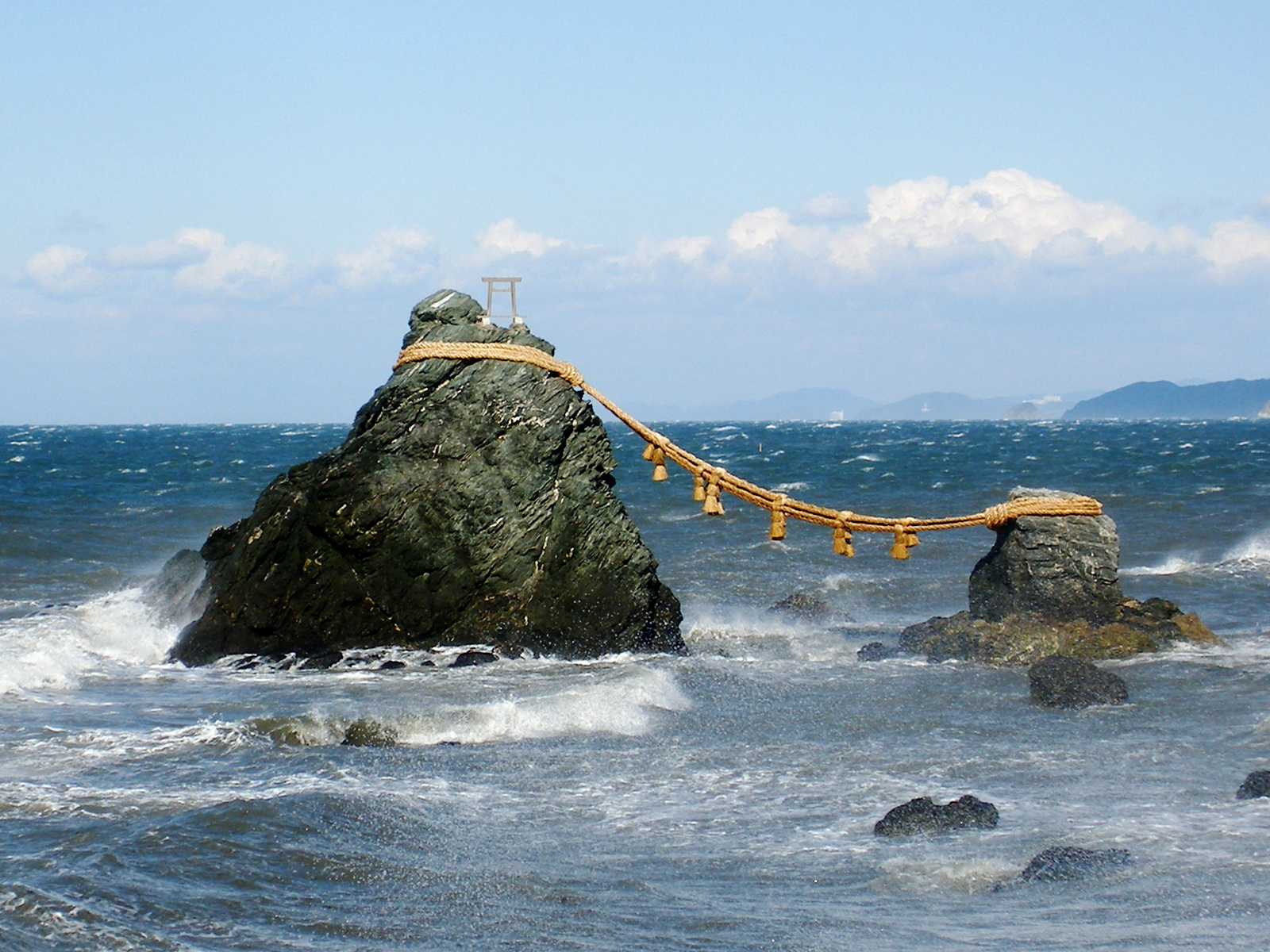

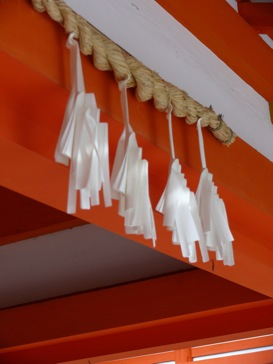

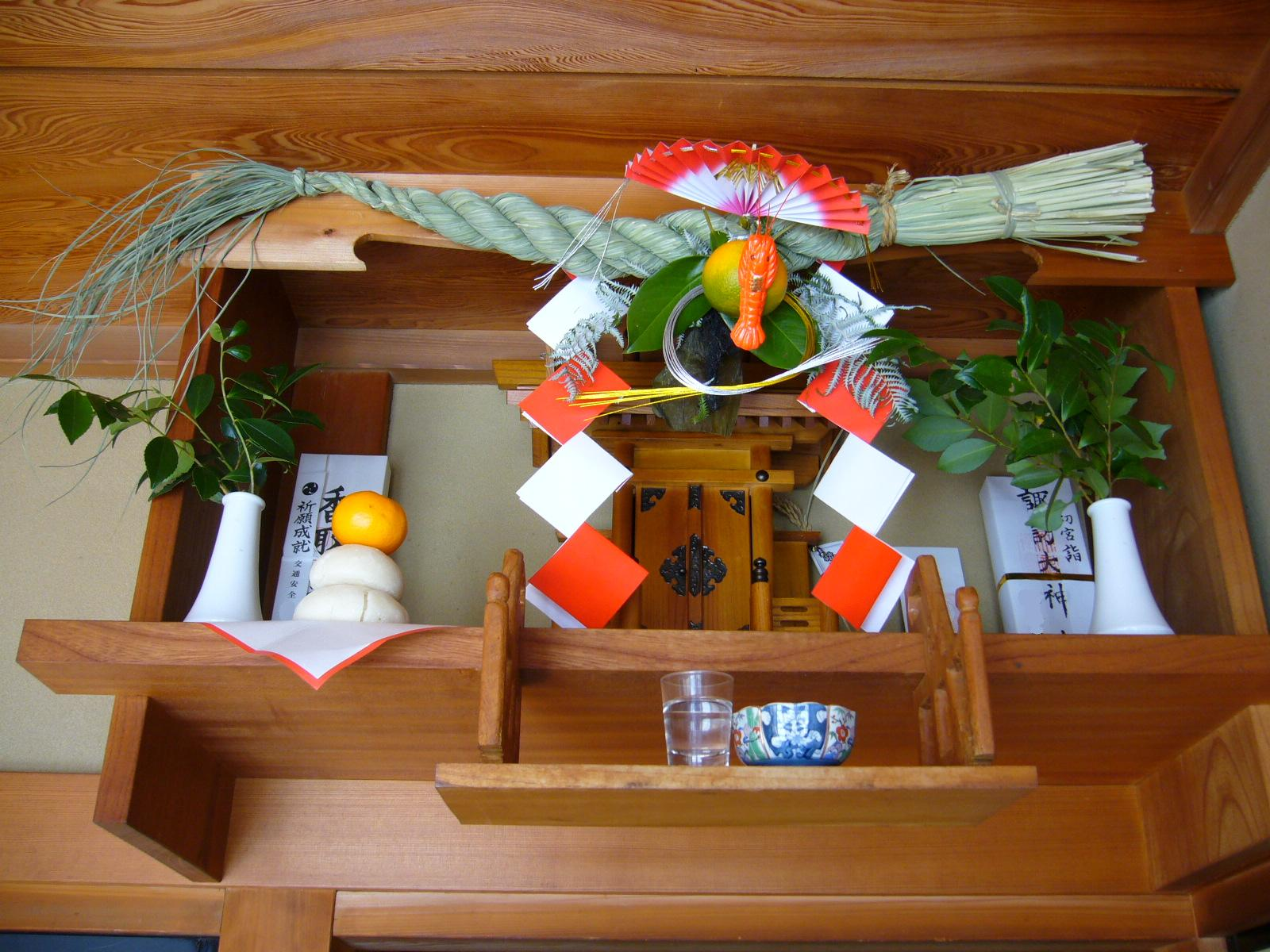

== See also ==
- Kamidana, household Shinto shrines
- Kanjo Nawa – a custom utilizing shimenawa
- Kumihimo, traditional Japanese braided cord
- Saekki
- Sai sin, sacred string in Thai and Cambodian Buddhism and animism
