= Futami Okitama Shrine =

Japanese Shrine

Coordinates: 34°30′32″N 136°47′16″E

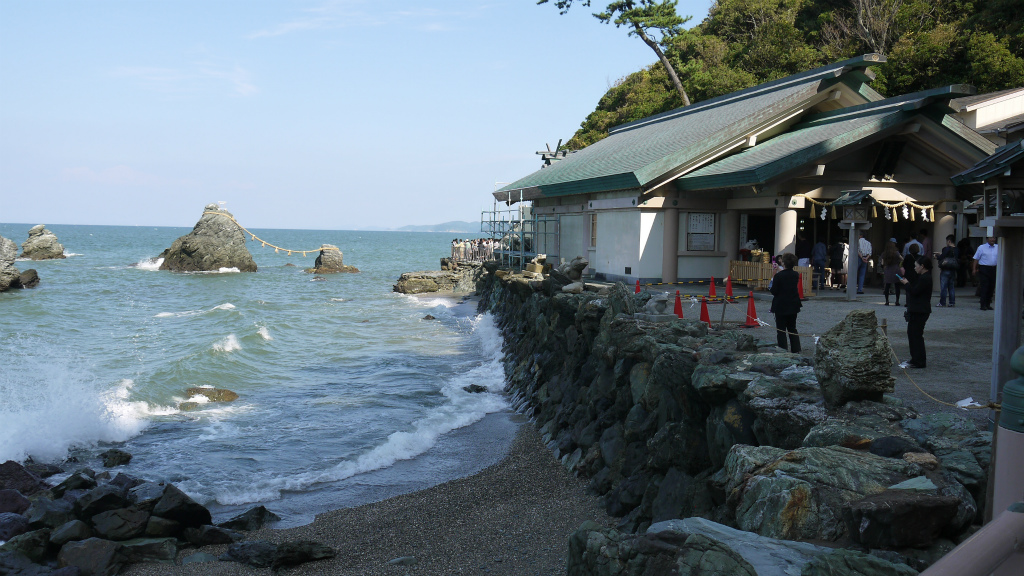

Religion
- Affiliation: Shinto

Location
- Municipality: Ise
- Country: Japan
- Interactive map of Futami Okitama Shrine

The Futami Okitama Shrine (二見興玉神社, Futami Okitama-jinja) is a Shinto shrine in Ise, in Mie Prefecture, Japan. It is known for its proximity to the Meoto Iwa rocks, which serve as torii gates for believers offering prayers to the sun.

== Characteristics ==
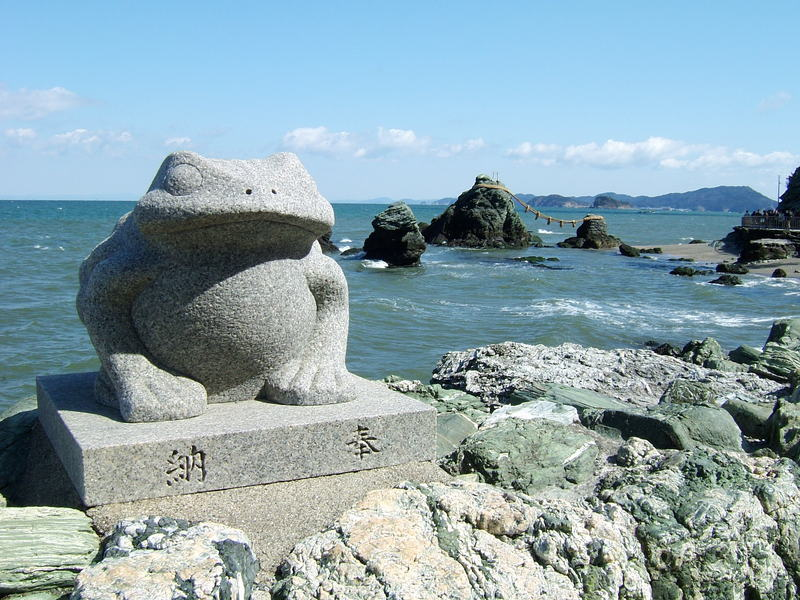
Statue of a frog in front of the Meoto Iwa sacred stones.

The shrine is dedicated to the Shinto deity Sarutahiko Ōkami and worships the Meoto Iwa rocks, which represent the gods Izanagi and Izanami. Because of its proximity, 700 m from the coast, it is common for couples to go to the shrine to pray for their marriage. The temple is a typical purification stop before visiting the Ise Grand Shrine, through the ceremony of harae, pilgrims used to bathe in the waters of Futami and then go to the neighboring shrine.

The grounds of the enclosure are decorated with numerous statues of frogs.; According to the beliefs, these attract people and objects back. The faithful whose prayers were fulfilled donate the figures of amphibians.

== See also ==
- Japanese mythology
- Kuniumi
