= Kannabi =

Sacred locations in Shinto

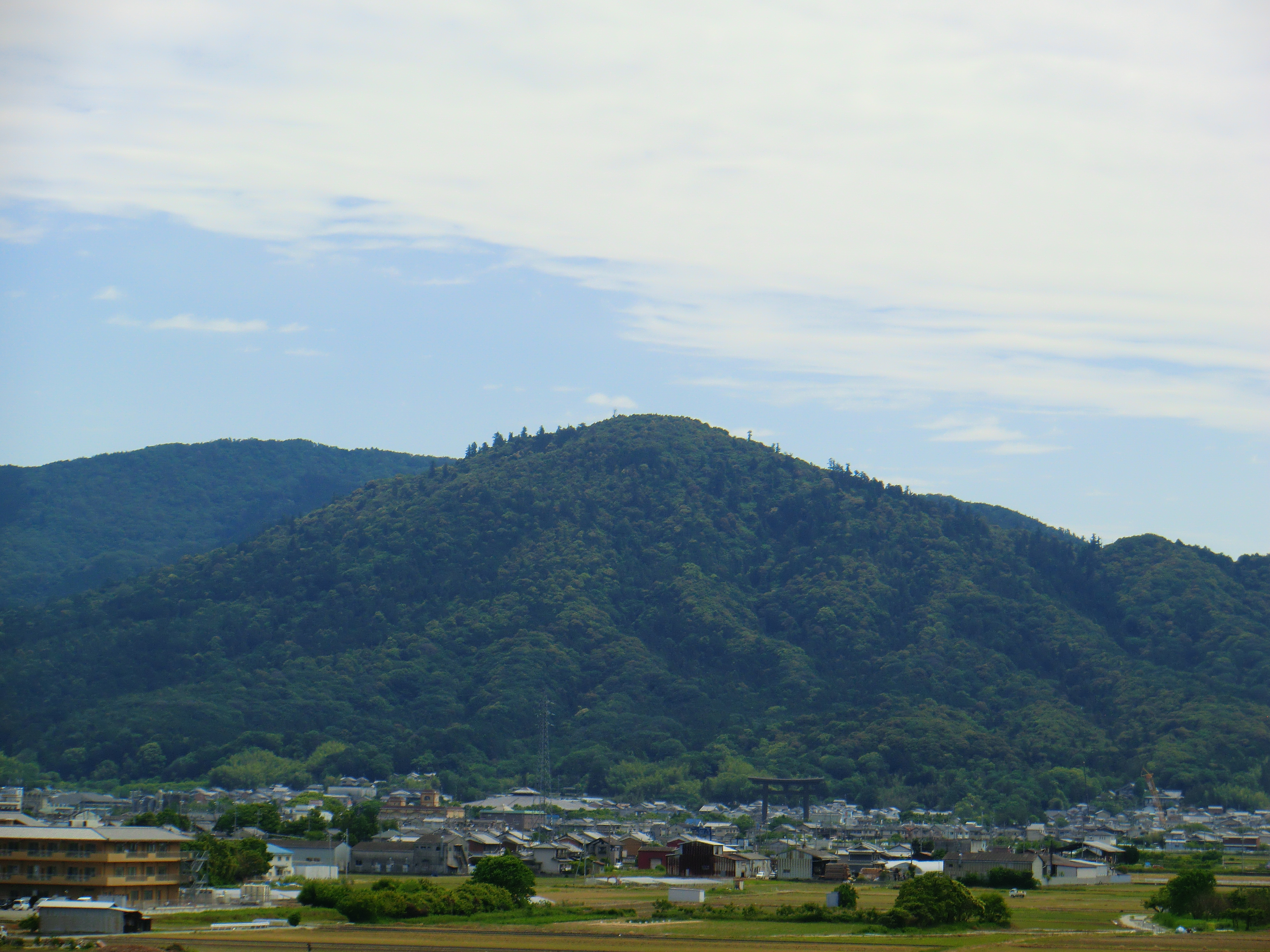
Omiwa Shrine has Mount Miwa as its Shintai and does not have a honden.

Kannabi (神奈備), also kaminabi or kamunabi, refers to a region in Shinto that is a shintai (repositories in which kami reside) itself, or hosts a kami. They are generally either mountains or forests. Nachi Falls is considered a kannabi, as is Mount Miwa.

== Overview ==
They may be host to shinboku (sacred trees), or Iwakura rocks They may have shimenawa, torii, and sandō marking the path towards them.

Shrines dedicated to kannabi often lack a honden or haiden, and instead enshrine the natural kannabi as deities. Ōmiwa Shrine is one such example. Kanasana Shrine also has its mountain as its shintai.

== See also ==
- Age of the Gods
- Ko-Shintō
- Himorogi・Iwakura (Yorishiro)
- Shintai・Yorishiro
- Shinboku
- Sacred mountains・Mountain worship
- Kannagi which has a similar etymology
- Chinju no Mori
