= Mountain worship =

Faiths which regard mountains as objects of worship

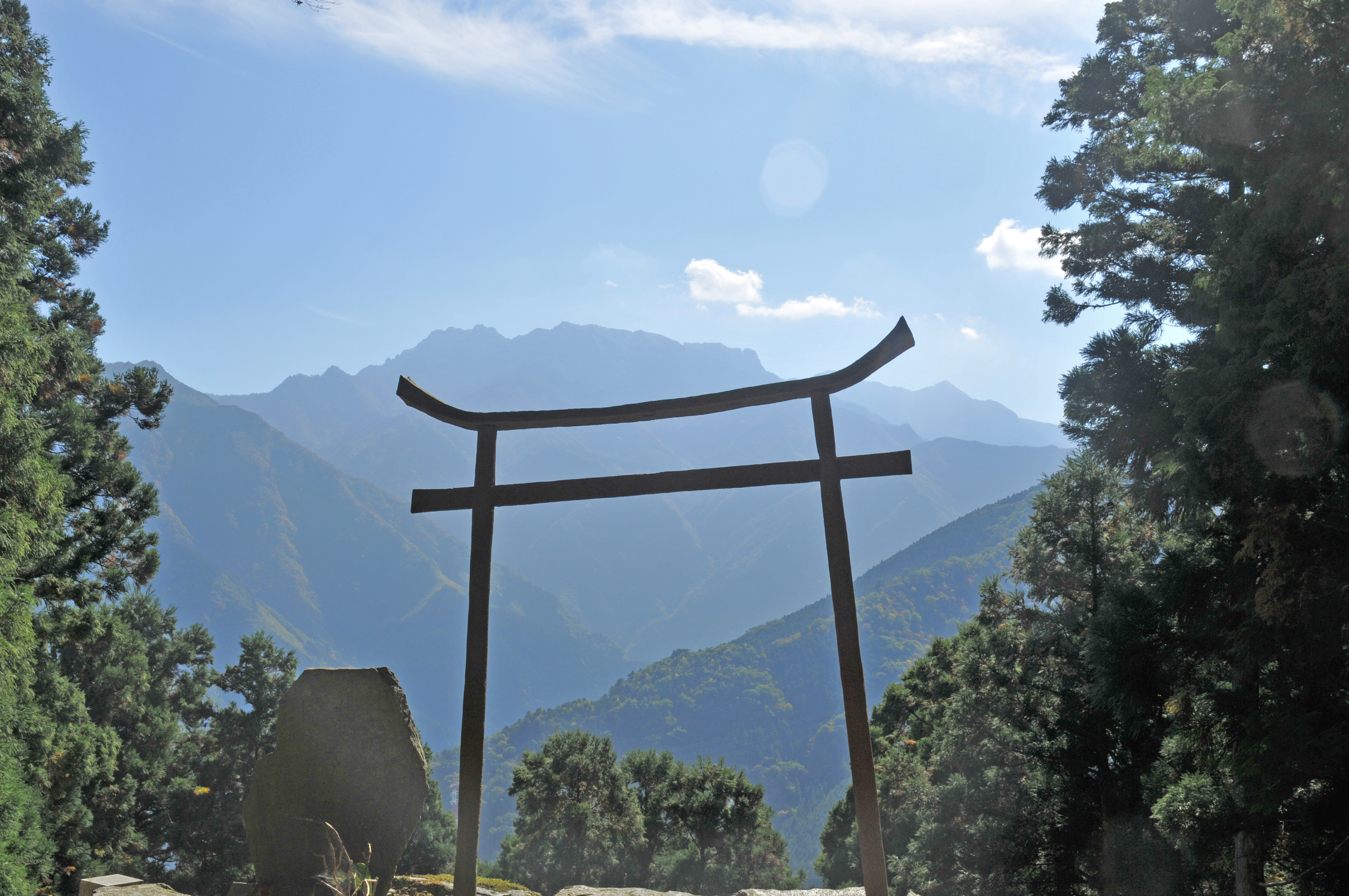
Hoshigamori, a place of worship and Place of Scenic Beauty in Mount Ishizuchi, regarded as sacred grounds in Shugendō

Mountain worship is a faith that regards mountains as sacred objects of worship.

== Overview ==
Mountain worship, as a form of nature worship, is thought to have evolved from the reverence that ethnic groups closely associated with mountains have for mountainous terrain and the natural environment that accompanies it. In mountain worship, there is a belief in the spiritual power of mountainous areas and a form of using the overwhelming feeling of the mountains to govern one's life.

These faiths are mainly found in the cultures of inland mountainous regions, where mountains with inhospitable, rugged terrain are essential for their development.

In areas with such beliefs, people depend on the river flowing from the mountains and the forest spreading at the foot of the mountains for all their food, clothing, and shelter, and are constantly being blessed by the mountains they see. On the other hand, the people who hold these beliefs are in an environment where even the slightest carelessness in the rugged terrain and natural environment can lead to the loss of life. It is thought to be passed on as knowledge for one's own safety.

== Mountain worship by area ==
=== In Japan ===
In Japanese Ko-Shintō, due to the blessings obtained from water sources, hunting grounds, mines, forests, and awe and reverence for the majestic appearance of volcanos and mountains, these geographic feature are believed to be where the God resides or descends, and are sometimes called Iwakura or Iwasaka, the edge of the everlasting world (the land of the gods or divine realm). There is also the idea of Yamagami Taikai, in which the Soul (Ancestral Spirit) of the deceased returns to the mountains (others include Umi Taikai and Chikyu Taikai). These traditions also remain in Shinto shrines, and there are some cases where the mountain itself is worshipped, such as Mount Ishizuchi, Suwa-taisha, and Mount Miwa. In rural areas, there is a belief that Yama-no-Kami descends to the village in Spring to become Ta-no-Kami, and returns to the mountain after the autumn harvest, in relation to being a divine water source.

In Buddhism, a high mountain called Mount Meru is believed to rise at the center of the world, and Kūkai founded Mount Kōya and Saichō founded Mount Hiei. Due to these beliefs, the reverence for mountains grew even deeper. This is the reason why Buddhist temples, even in the plains, have Sangōji.

In Vajrayana Buddhism, holy mountains are also objects of worship, but the faith is dedicated to the mountain itself, and climbing the mountain is often considered forbidden. In Japan, on the other hand, it is noteworthy that reaching the top of a mountain is considered important. Of course, the Japanese have faith in the mountain itself, but they also have a strong tendency to appreciate the God's Light that is worshipped early in the morning, probably because they have faith in what lies beyond the top of the mountain (the other world). In Japan, Sun worship as Animism is connected with mountain worship.

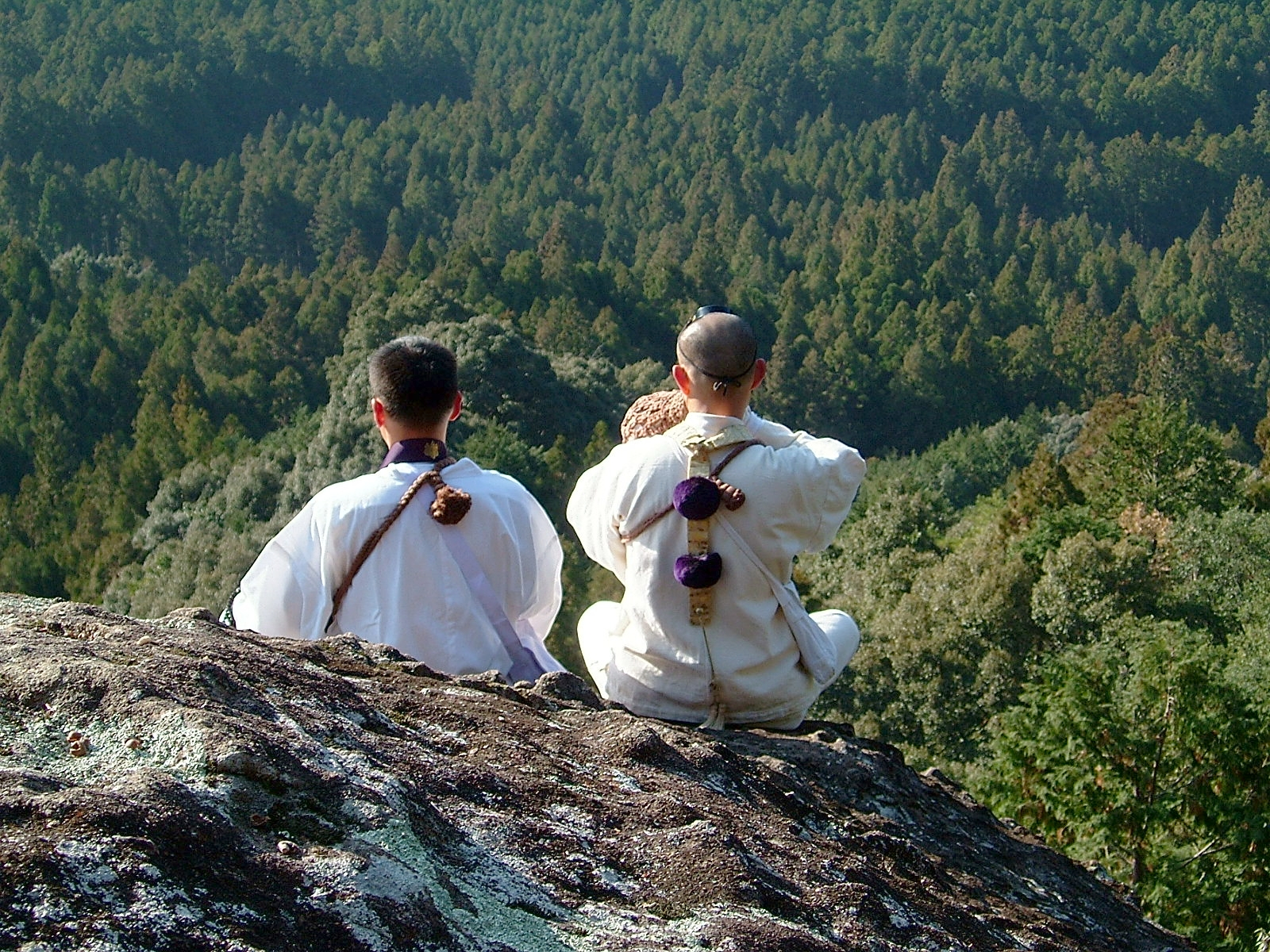
Yamabushi practicing in the mountains

Later, Shugenjas and Yamabushis, who were descended from Esoteric Buddhism and Taoism, went deep into the mountains to practice asceticism in order to disconnect from the mundane world and achieve Enlightenment. This later gave rise to Shugendō and spell-like religions.

Mountain gods are often linked to Sea gods in Japan. Examples including Konpira Gongen. The logic behind it is that mountains are often used for navigation in the sea, so mountain deities help sailors. There is a "Sea Shugendo" in which many mountain traditions are applied to the sea, notably centering around Oarai Isosaki Shrine.

==== Main forms ====
The main forms of mountain worship in Japan can be summarized as follows.

- Belief in volcanoes: Mount Fuji, Mt. Aso, Mt. Chokai, and other volcanoes are believed to have gods because of the fear of volcanic eruptions. Chōkaisan Ōmonoimi Shrine is located on Mount Chokai for this reason.
- Belief in the mountain as a source of water: Belief in mountains, such as Mt. Hakusan, which can be a source of water to enrich the surrounding area.
- Belief in a mountain where the spirits of the dead are said to gather: In Japan, there are many mountains such as Osorezan, Tsukiyama, Tateyama, Kumano Sanzan, etc. where the spirits of the dead are believed to go after death, and these mountains are sometimes the object of worship.
- Belief in mountains where divine spirits are said to be: In the Buzen Province, Mount Miwa is the inner shrine of Usa Jingū, Ōmiwa Shrine, and Mount Ōmine is said to have been founded by En no Gyōja. Mount Sobo, located on the border between Bungo Country and Hyūga Country, has had an upper shrine on the summit and eight lower shrines at the foot of the mountain since the middle of the 7th century, according to Kojiki, Nihon Shoki, Emperor Jimmu's grandmother, Toyotama-hime, who appears in the Yamayokohiko and Umiyokohiko myths, is also said to be of the Okami lineage.

==== The birth of Shugendō ====
It is worth mentioning that in Japan, mountain worship was combined with belief in ancient Shinto, Taoism and Buddhism (especially esoteric Buddhist traditions such as Tendai-shu and Shingon-shu) to create a unique religion called "Shugendō". Shugendō is the practice of giving people the spiritual power of the mountains absorbed through ascetic practices, and is said to have been founded by Yaku Shokaku. Even today, ascetic monks (called Yamabushi or Shugenja) of the "Honzan" (Tendai sect) or "Tohzan" (Shingon sect) schools practice traditional Shugendō.

==== History ====
Mountain worship originally evolved from Animism of Nature worship, and took the form of Shinbutsu-shūgō until the end of the Edo period, when Shinbutsu-shūgō was banned by the Meiji Government. However, since the Separation of Buddhism and Shinto after the Meiji era, temples and shrines have been separated, including in the Three Mountains of Dewa where Shugen of the Shingon esoteric Buddhism type was originally established. Many of the main body of beliefs survived in the form of shrines.

While the mountains were the object of worship as the divine realm, they also developed as the other realm where the spirits of the dead gathered, and where offerings to ancestral spirits, such as Itako's Kuchiyose, were made. In addition, it is customary for people to climb mountains as a manifestation of their faith, and even today many people climb mountains, including those that are considered sacred sites.

=== In China ===
The most renowned mountains regarded as deities in China, called the Five Great Mountains (五岳; 'Five Peaks'), are Tai Shan, Song Shan, Hua Shan, Heng Shan in Hunan and Heng Shan in Shanxi. The worship of these mountains is considered to have originally involved belief in the mountains themselves, but now it's related to the various gods of Taoism through its association with Pangu mythology and the Five Elements. One exception is Mount Tai, which is a sacred place according to Taoism, but also retains different forms of mountain worship such as the Tai Temple and Shigandang.

=== In Malaysia ===
The Kadazan-Dusun of Sabah in north of Borneo revere Mount Kinabalu as a meeting place for spirits of the deceased and the eight realm of the upperworld (Hibabou or Libabou) close in contact with earth; the spirits are often placated in ceremonies performed by the bobolian.

=== Others ===
Other cultures concerned with mountain worship include:

- Korean people, Yanbian Korean people
- Chinese people
- Tibetan people
- Manchurian people
- Yamato people
- Vietnamese people
- Peoples of Nepal
- Ladakhi people
- Andean civilizations

== Impact of tourism and modern mountaineering ==
Areas that respect mountain faith, such as Mount Everest and Uluru, have been affected by the advent of mountaineering, which has become easier with the development of transportation and the availability of tools and equipment, allowing people from all walks of life to enter the sacred terrains of the mountains for the purpose of tourism, sports or competition. This can impose a psychological as well as economic burden on residents of these areas. In some cases they expressed beliefs of fear of being punished because of violations to religious prohibitions involving their faith in the mountains, such as littering and climbing accidents due to overconfidence, and have held large-scale festivals to appease the mountains.

== See also ==
- Lords of the Three Mountains, Taoist deities representing three mountains in Southern China
- Sansin, Korean mountain deities
- Sacred mountains
- Three Mountains of Dewa

== Bibliography ==
- Taro Wakamori, A Study of the History of Shugendō, Heibonsha [Toyo Bunko], 1972. ISBN 4582802117. Kawade Shobo, 1943.
- Miyake, Jun, Shugendō: Its History and Practice, Kodansha [Kodansha Academic Library], 2001. ISBN 4061594834.
- Miyake, Jun, Studies in Omine Shugendō, Kosei Shuppansha, 1988.
- Jun Miyake, Shugendō and Japanese Religion, Shunjusha, 1995.
- Jun Miyake (ed.), An Invitation to Mountain Shugen: Spiritual Mountains and the Experience of Asceticism, Shinjin-Oraisha, 2011, ISBN 9784404039897.
- Gorai Shigeru, Religion in the Mountains, Awakosha, 1970.
- Akihide Suzuki, Shugendō: A Collection of Historical and Ethnographic Essays, 3 volumes, Hozokan, 2003–2004.
- Kesao Miyamoto, Tengu to Shugenja (Tengu and Shugenja), Jinbunshiin, 1989.
- Yasuaki Togawa, A Study of Dewa Sanzan Shugendō, Kosei Shuppansha, 1973.
- Haruki Kageyama, Shintai-zan (Mt. Shintai), Gakusei-sha (New edition), 2001 (1971) (in Japanese).
- Satoru Nagano, A Historical-Geographical Study of Hidehiko-yama Shugendō, Meishu Shuppan, 1987.
- Masataka Suzuki, Mountains, Gods and People: The World of Mountain Belief and Shugendō, Awakosha, 1991.
- "Mountain Beliefs: Exploring the Roots of Japanese Culture," by Masataka Suzuki, Chuokoron Shinsha [Chuko Shinsho], 2015.
- Masataka Suzuki, "Mountain Beliefs in Japan," Takarajimasya [Bessatsu Takarajima 2373], 2015.
- Akihide Suzuki, Shugendō Historical and Ethnographic Review, 3 volumes, Hozokan, 2003–2004.
- Iwashina Koichiro, "History of Fuji-kō," Meisho Shuppan, 1985.
- "Studies in the History of Mountain Religions," 18 volumes, Meisho Shuppan, 1975–1984.
- "History of Wazuka Town," Vol. 1.
