= Ōmiwa Shrine =

Shinto shrine in Sakurai, Japan

Ōmiwa jinja 大神神社
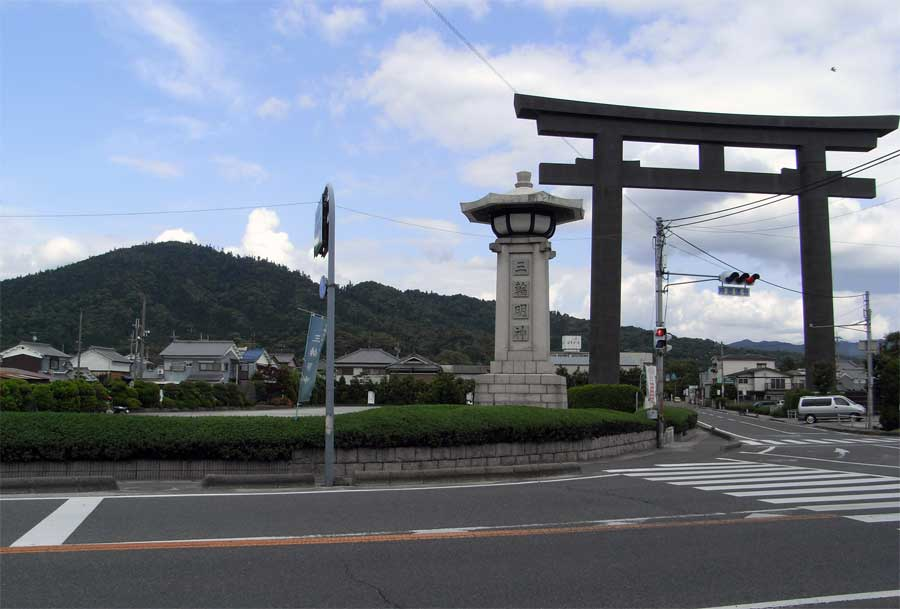
- Large torii in front of Mount Miwa

- Location within Japan

Religion
- Affiliation: Shinto
- Deity: Ōmononushi; Ōnamuchi; Sukunahikona-no-kami; Mount Miwa

Location
- Location: 1422 Miwa, Sakurai-shi, Nara-ken
- Interactive map of Ōmiwa jinja 大神神社
- Coordinates: 34°31′44″N 135°51′10″E

Website
- www.oomiwa.or.jp

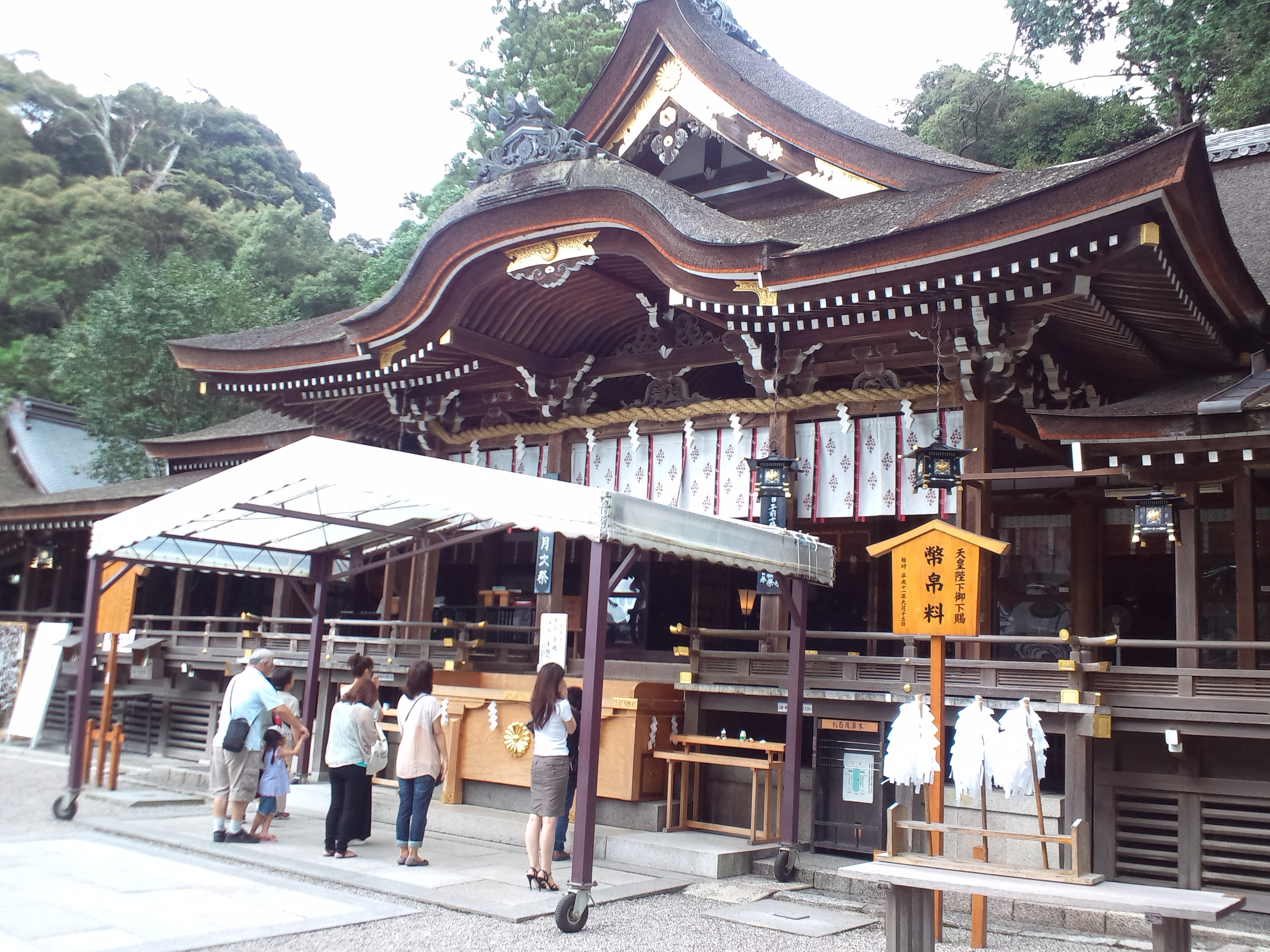
Hall of worship

Ōmiwa Shrine (大神神社, Ōmiwa-jinja), also known as Miwa Shrine (三輪神社, Miwa-jinja; alternately written as Miwa-myōjin (三輪明神)), is a Shinto shrine located in Sakurai, Nara Prefecture, Japan. The shrine is notable because it contains no sacred images or objects, since it is believed to serve Mount Miwa, the mountain on which it stands. For the same reason, it has a worship hall (拝殿, haiden), but no place for the deity to be housed (神殿, shinden). In this sense, it is a model of what the first Shinto shrines were like. Ōmiwa Shrine is one of the oldest extant Shinto shrines in Japan and the site has been sacred ground for some of the earliest religious practices in Japan. Because of this, it has sometimes been named as Japan's first shrine. Ōmiwa Shrine is a tutelary shrine of the Japanese sake brewers.

== History ==
Ōmiwa Shrine's history is closely related to Mount Miwa and the religious practices surrounding the mountain. In the early Kofun period, Yamato kings and leaders had shifted their attention to kami worship on Mount Miwa, and Ōmiwa Shrine was the major institution for this branch of worship. The style of Shinto surrounding Miwa became later known as Miwa Shinto and is set apart from previous practices by a more structured theological philosophy.

The shrine became the object of Imperial patronage during the early Heian period. In 965, Emperor Murakami ordered that Imperial messengers be sent to report important events to the guardian kami of Japan. These heihaku were initially presented to 16 shrines, including Ōmiwa.

Ōmiwa was designated as the chief Shinto shrine (ichinomiya) for the former Yamato Province.

From 1871 through 1946, Ōmiwa was officially designated one of the Kanpei-taisha (官幣大社), meaning that it stood in the first rank among government supported shrines.

== Religious significance ==
The Ōmiwa Shrine is directly linked to Mount Miwa in that the mountain is the shrine's shintai, or "kami-body", instead of a building housing a "kami-body". This type of mountain worship (shintai-zan) is found in the earliest forms of Shinto and has also been employed at Suwa Shrine in Nagano, and formerly at Isonokami Shrine in Nara and Munakata Shrine in Fukuoka.

According to the chronicle Nihon Shoki, Emperor Sujin appealed to Mount Miwa's kami when Japan was crippled by plague. In response, the kami Ōmononushi demanded rituals be performed for him at Mount Miwa. He then demanded that the rites be led by Ōtataneko, his half-kami, half-human son born from the union with a woman of the Miwa clan. Ōtataneko performed the rites to satisfaction, and the plague subsided. A building dedicated to Ōtataneko was later erected in his honor.

A legendary white snake is said to live in around the shrine and is supposedly one of the kami worshiped there. Indeed, snakes and the snake cult figures importantly in the myths surrounding Mount Miwa as well as early Shinto in general.

== Auxiliary shrines ==
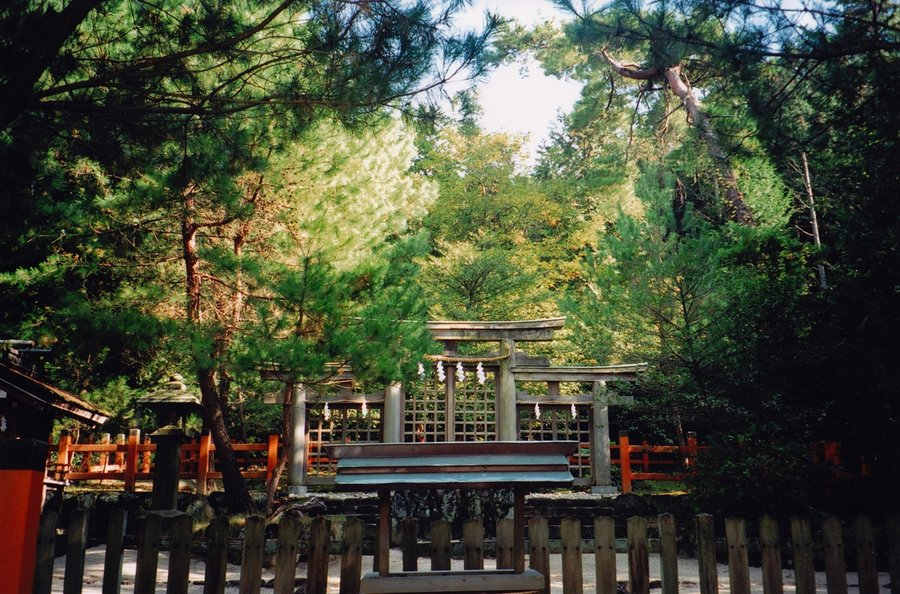
Hibara Shrine, the most important sessha of Ōmiwa Shrine dedicated to young mitama (wakamitama) of Amaterasu, Izanagi and Izanami, considered the first origin of Ise Grand Shrine, called "Moto-Ise".

The Ōmiwa shrine complex includes notable auxiliary shrines (setsumatsusha), including 12 Sessha (摂社, auxiliary shrine) and 28 massha (末社, branch shrine) which are marked by small structures falling under Ōmiwa's jurisdiction. For example, the sessha Ikuhi jinja enshrines the kami who was appointed Ōmiwa's sake brewer in the 4th month of the 8th year of the reign of Emperor Sujin. A poem associated with Ikuhi is said to have been composed by Empress Jingū on the occasion of a banquet for her son, Emperor Ōjin:

This is sacred sake

is not my sacred sake.

This sacred sake brewed by Ōmononushi
How long ago
How long ago.

== Hibara Shrine ==
Hibara Shrine is a subshrine of Omiwa Shrine at the foot of Mount Miwa in Sakurai, Nara Prefecture. The shrine is identified as the place where the Yata-no-Kagami and the Kusanagi-no-Tsurugi were first enshrined after they were removed from the imperial palace. It is the first of many Moto-Ise shrines. Amaterasu was originally enshrined there before eventually moving to other Moto-Ise shrines and then finally to Ise Jingu. It has an Iwakura rock and a Shinza made of Sakaki wood.

It has a prominent unique closable triple torii gate.

== Architecture ==
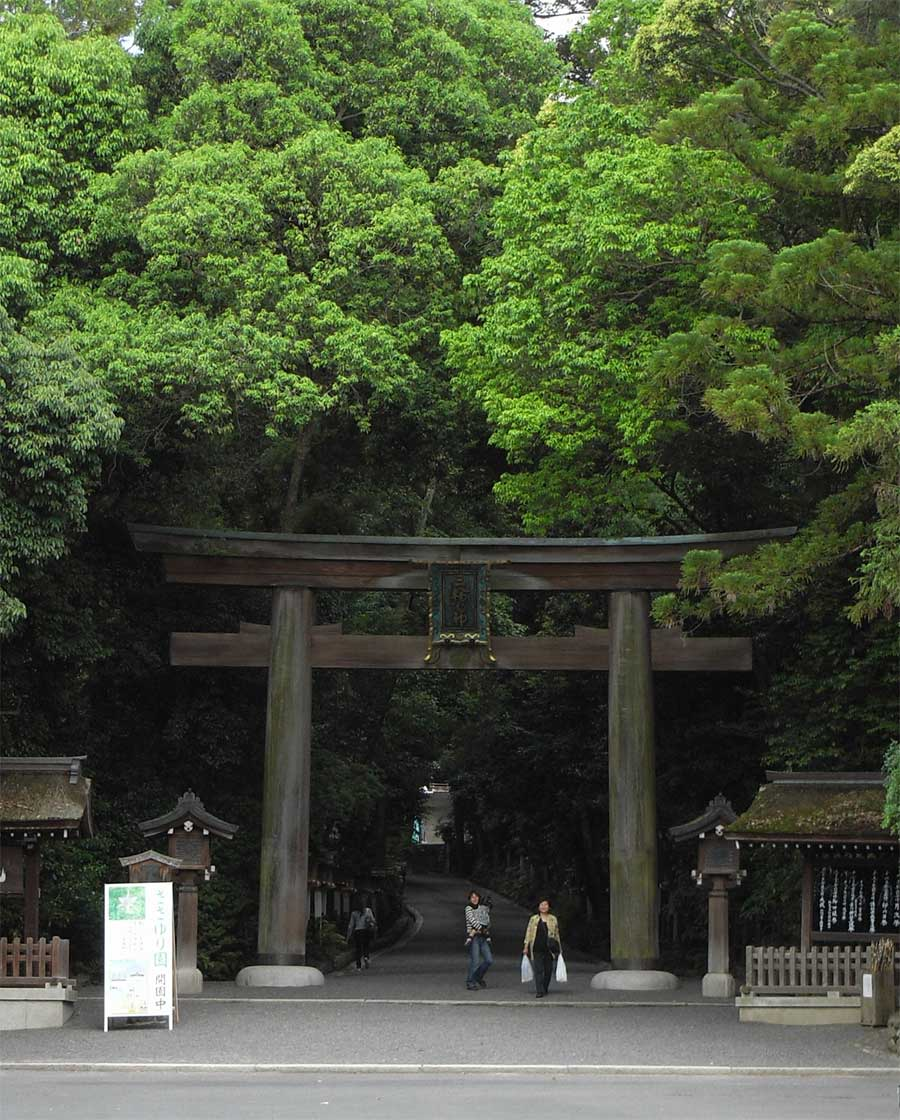
Second torii leading to the inner sanctuary

Ōmiwa Shrine is situated in a quiet forest and built directly in front of Mount Miwa. An ancient Japanese cedar tree (Cryptomeria) can be found on shrine compound and is considered sacred. The shrine has Mount Miwa as its Shintai, as a Kannabi and does not have a honden.

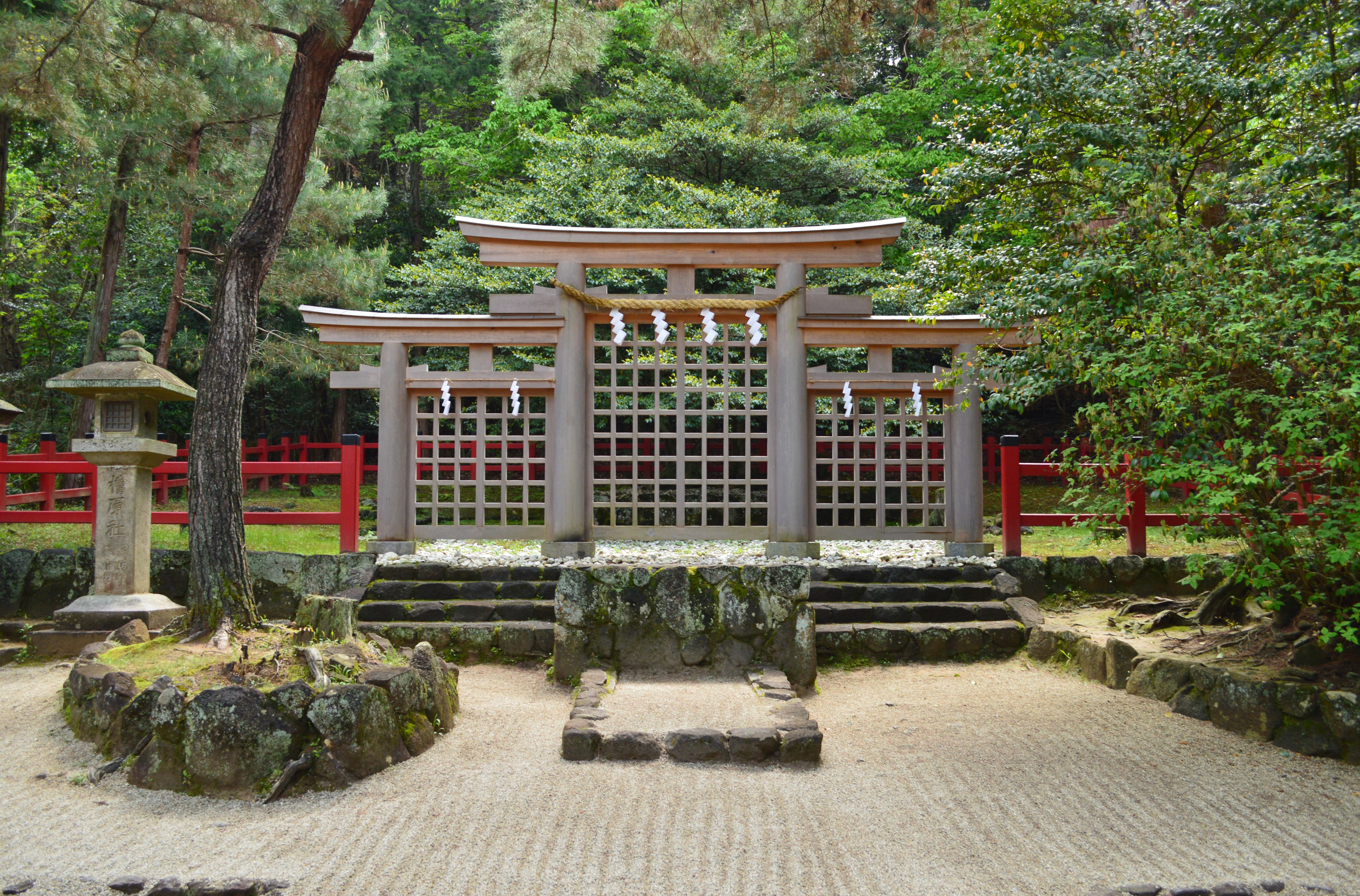
Miwa Torii demonstrating both their threefold nature and the closed gate

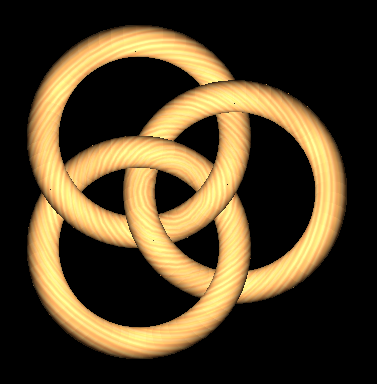
Borromean rings motif

Decorations in the form of Borromean rings are found throughout the shrine's buildings. This ornamentation symbolizes the three rings, as "Miwa" is written with the kanji for "three" (三) and "ring" (輪).

Built in 1984, at 32 m the torii on its sandō is the second highest in Japan. The shrine also has a great shime torii, an ancient form of gate made only with two posts and a rope called shimenawa. It is one of few shrines that has a "triple-torii" (miwa torii) on its grounds. This gate is also one of the few to actually have doors, which bar access to the mountain it enshrines (though Mount Miwa is publicly accessible by same-day arrangement with the Sai Jinja office).

The buildings at Ōmiwa Shrine are a mix of structures built from ancient times to the Edo period.

== National treasures ==
=== Important Cultural Assets ===
- The entire shrine compound
- The 17th century haiden, or prayer hall, built with cypress bark roofing
- The "Triple-torii" (miwa torii)
- The shinden dedicated to Ōtata Neko
- Suit of bronze armor, lacquered red
- A copy of the Book of Zhou, scroll number 19

== See also ==
- Asteroid 24640 Omiwa
- Koshintō
- List of Shinto shrines
- Miwa clan
- Modern system of ranked Shinto Shrines
- Mount Miwa
- Twenty-Two Shrines
