= Kannagi (Shinto) =

Shinto shaman

Kannagi (巫 or 神和ぎ or 神薙ぎ or 神凪) are shamans in Shinto. Unlike the similar term miko, the term is gender neutral. The term has a few different writing styles, one being 巫, which is a shared kanji character as used for the Chinese Wu shaman.

== Overview ==
A kannagi represents the act of communicating with a yorishiro of a kami, or a possession of a kami, or a person who serves in that role.

Kumagusu Minakata, in his book Ichiko ni kansuru koto, refers to miko serving shrines as kannagi, and to wandering miko as miko.

Depending on the shrine, the word "kannagi" is used to refer to a miko who serves the shrine, and the word miko is used to refer to a wandering miko. (Ōmiwa Shrine), Waka (Shiogama Shrine), Tamayorihime, Osame (Katori Shrine), Osome (Kibitsu Shrine), Itsukiko (Matsuo Shrine) Suwa-taisha, Kibitsu Shrine,

Kunio Yanagita says that these two types of maidens were originally the same person, but were later separated, because there are other names for wandering miko, such as Oichi of Suwa Shrine, Sou-no-ichi of Atsuta Shrine, and Waka of Shiogama Shrine.

== Etymology ==
The word kannagi is derived from kami (神, kan) and the word nagi meaning a calm state, which has many readings

1. Nagi (和ぎ) is a peaceful and calm state, and is mainly used for emotions and circumstances.
2. Nagi (凪) is synonymous with calming, but nowadays it often refers to the state of the sea where there is no wind and there are no calm waves . In addition, it is one of the few Kanji originating in Japan and represents the state where the wind has stopped.
3. Nagi (薙ぎ) refers to a state in which a mountain is collapsing and becoming flat, or a flat field where vegetation is cut, but it also means to drive it sideways (to remove it). From that, it means cleansing as a Shinto ritual . In addition, there are Nagi Shinto rituals all over Japan, and it is said to be an act of calming storms and winds in the inland regions . A rare character is "𡵢 (Nagi)", which is an Ateji character for Nagi because it means collapse.

There are various kanji notations for "Nagi", and it is often used as a homonym for Tree, mountain, or place name. Most of them relate to places of Belief in Japanese Shinto, Myth and Koshinto, and are used as part of the names of Shinto shrines and Japanese deities. It is also used in the name of Izanagi and the sword Kusanagi no Tsurugi. It is used in the name of the tree Nageia nagi.
