= Himorogi =

Shinto worship space

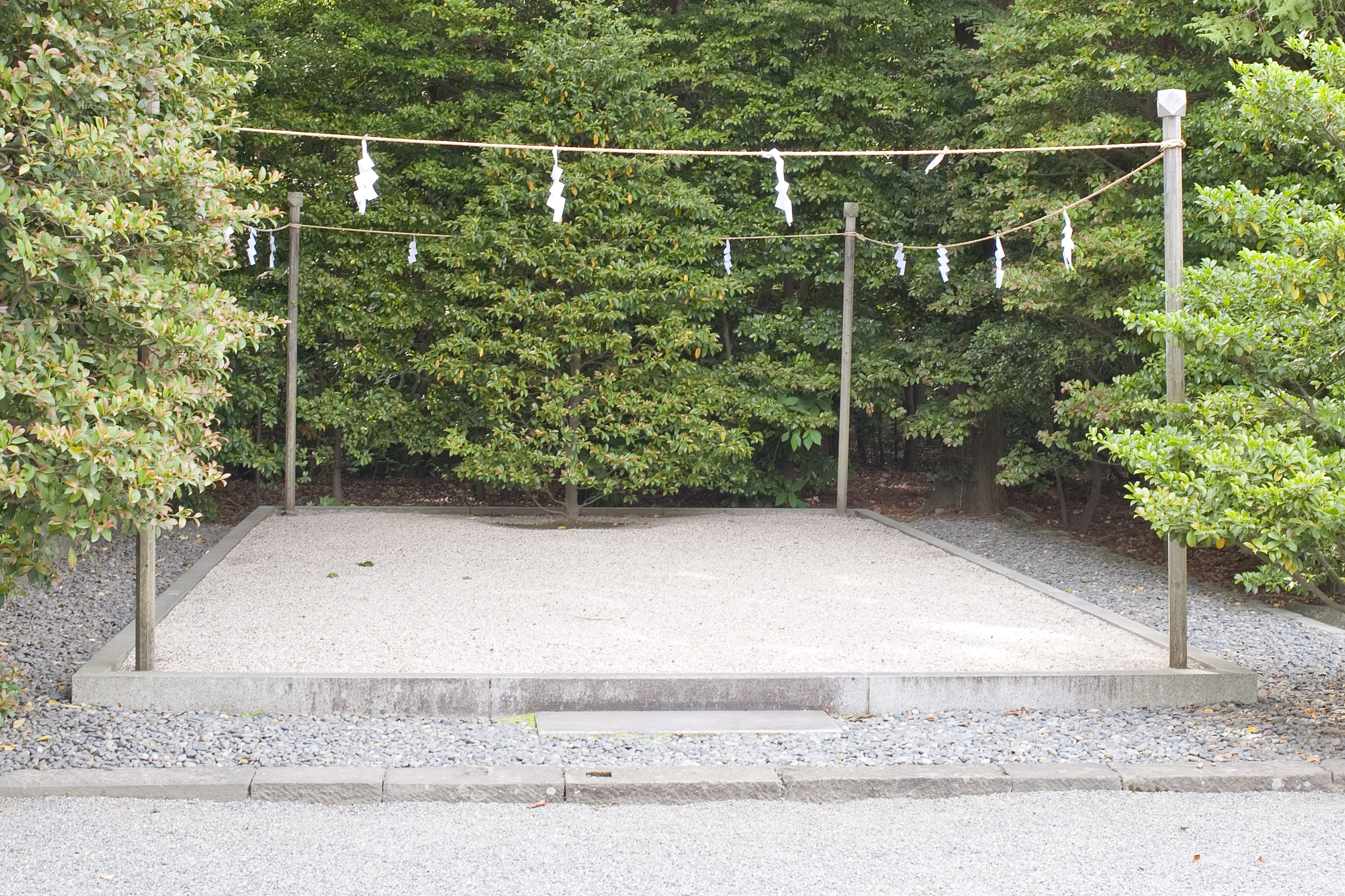
A himorogi at Tsurugaoka Hachiman-gū

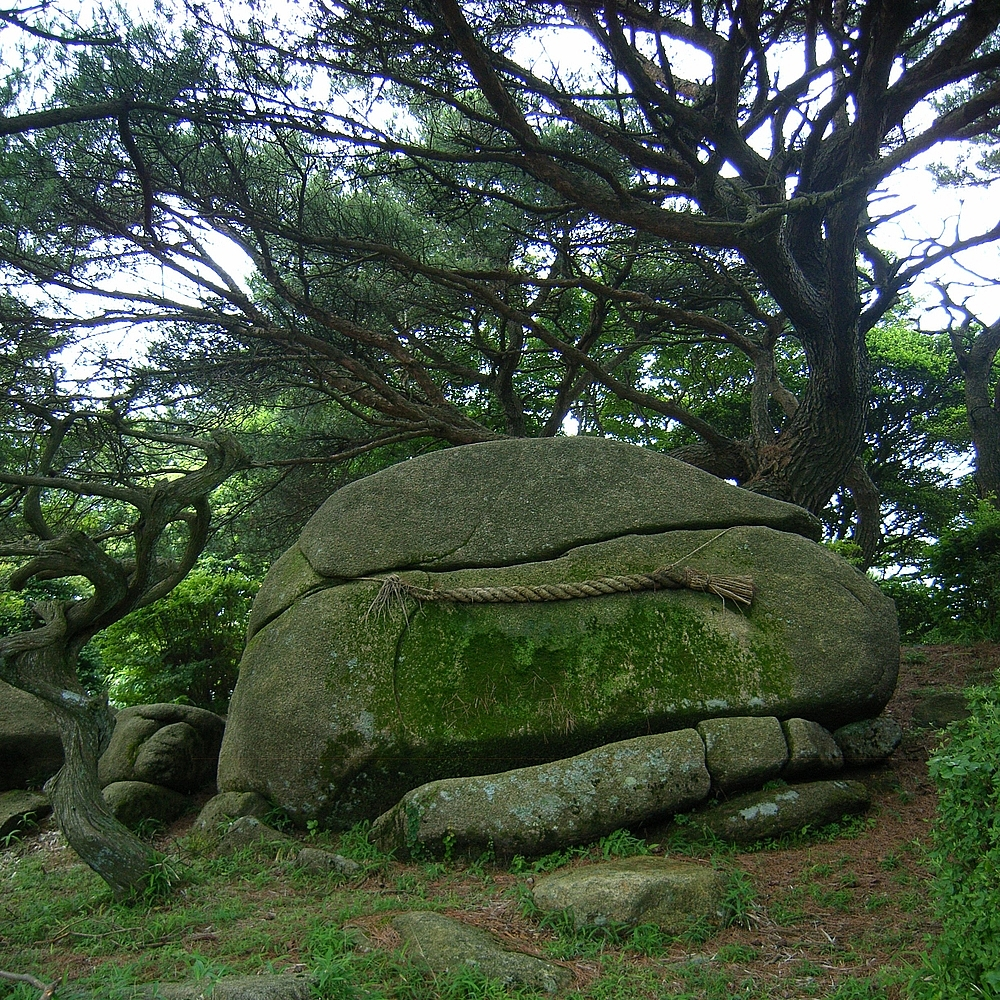
Himorogi of Amenohohi-no-mikoto at Rokkosan Country House

Himorogi (神籬; lit. "spirit fence") in Shinto terminology are sacred spaces or altars used to worship. In their simplest form, they are square areas with green bamboo or sakaki at the corners without architecture. These in turn support sacred ropes (shimenawa) decorated with streamers called shide. A branch of sakaki or some other evergreen at the center acts as a yorishiro, a physical representation of the presence of the kami, a being which is in itself incorporeal.

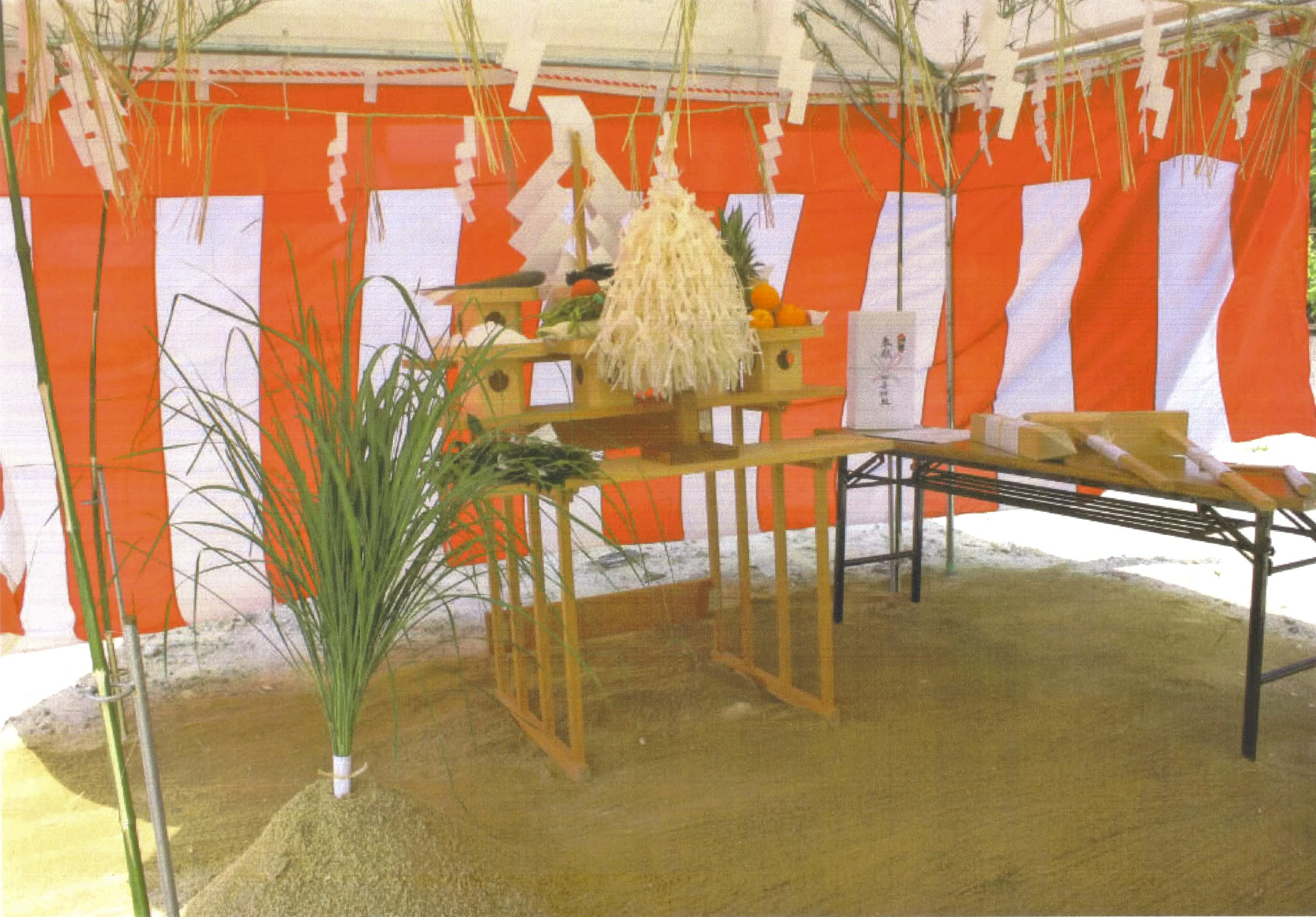
A himorogi built for a jichinsai

During the Aoi Festival in Kyoto the himorogi is a square space surrounded by green branches with an evergreen tree at the center as a yorishiro. A more elaborate himorogi can also be made with a straw mat on the ground with on it a ceremonial 8-legged stand called an hassoku-an (八足案; eight leg an) decorated with shimenawa and sacred emblems.

The etymology of the word is unclear, but it appears already in the Nihon Shoki and in the Man'yōshū. The term first appears in the Nihon Shoki in the narrative of the tenson kōrin, where the deity Takamimusubi erects a himorogi together with an iwasaka in preparation for the descent to earth of his heavenly grandson; the same chronicle also records that, during the reign of Emperor Sujin, a shikataki himorogi was erected in the village of Yamato no Kasanui and used for the worship of Amaterasu Ōmikami.The term "himorogi" refers equally to the focal point "tree" and to the sacred space, both of which are deemed to be purified or "unpolluted".

Himorogi in Japan are most commonly seen at construction sites, where after use they stand for a while before actual work begins. They are built for a Shinto priest, who comes to bless the site during a ground-breaking ceremony called jichinsai (地鎮祭).

== See also ==
- The Glossary of Shinto for an explanation of terms concerning Japanese Shinto, Shinto art, and Shinto shrine architecture.
- Hiis (sacred site)
- Koshintō
- Shintai
