= Iwakura rock =

Shinto sacred rock

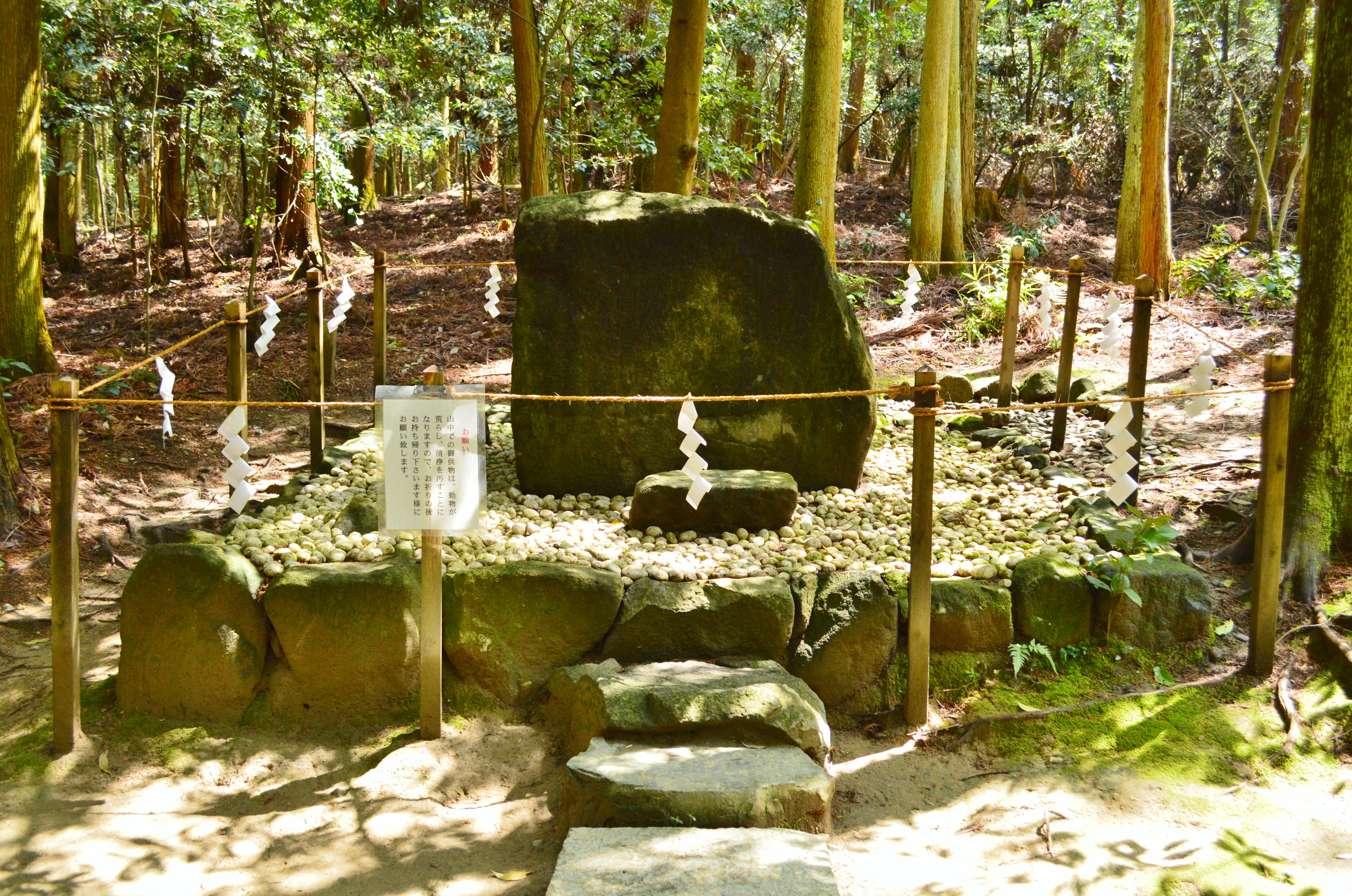
Yama-no-kami site (Sakurai City, Nara Prefecture)

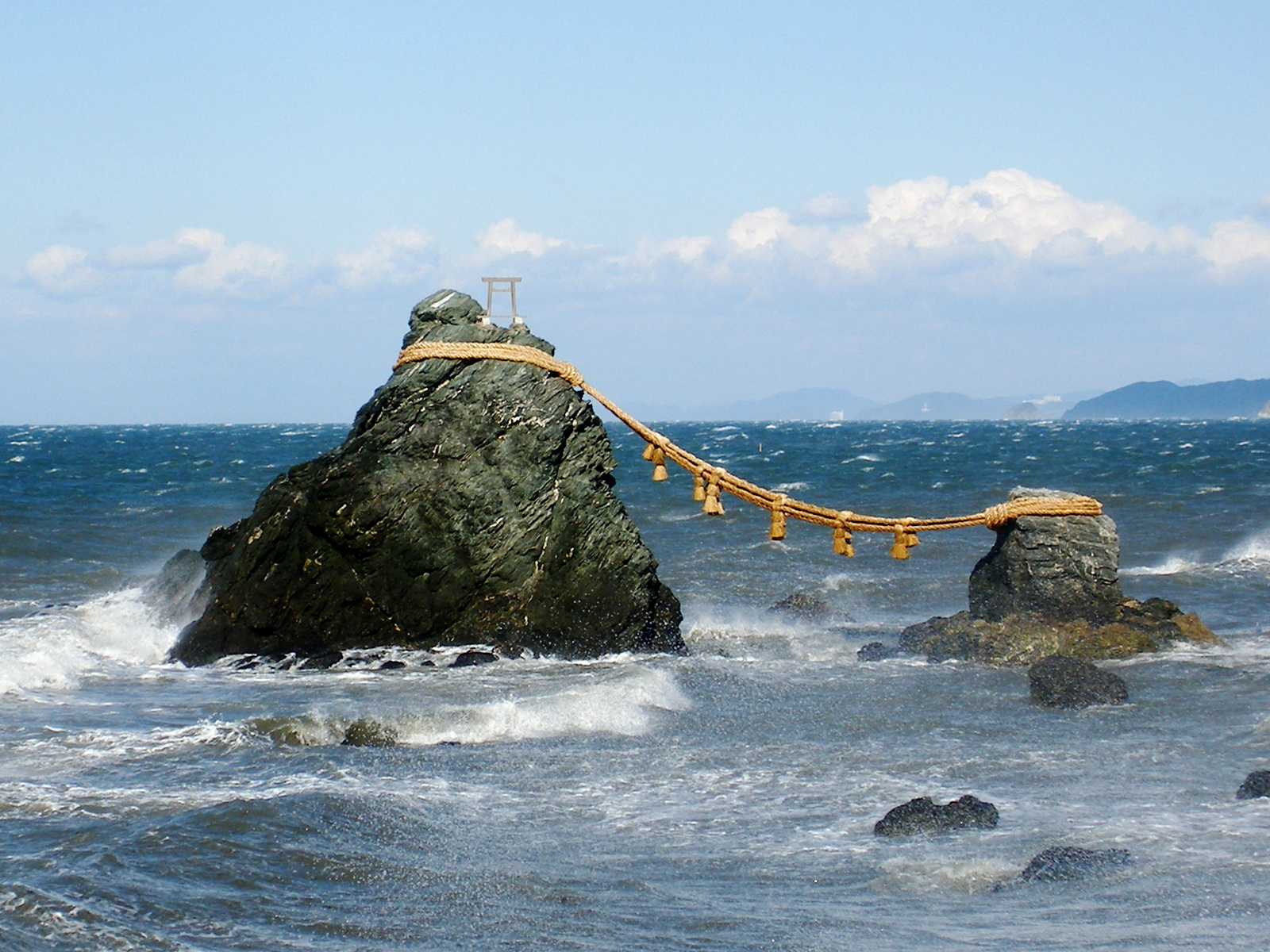
Meoto Iwa a subtype of Iwakura

Iwakura (磐座) refers to the belief in rocks as yorishiro containing kami in ancient Shinto. It also refers to the rock itself, which is the object of worship.

== Overview ==
Nature worship, also known as spirit worship or animism, is a type of base faith that has been present in Japan since ancient times. This form of worship revolves around the belief in gods and spirits that reside in nature. In Shinto rituals, gods are said to have descended from shintai, a rock, and the yorishiro, called himorogi, was made the center of the ritual, symbolizing the divine power of the gods.

As time passed and temples, where gods were believed to reside, became more permanent, the object of worship shifted from the body of the gods to the shrine itself. Sacred trees and stones, adorned with shimenawa ropes, can still be seen in many temple precincts.

Not every rock is regarded as sacred: distinguishing features such as unusual size, shape, colour, patterns, or chisel marks are what allow a rock to be identified as sacred, evoking a sense of mystery. In addition to rocks, there are several other forms of belief in nature in Japan, including Chinju no Mori, the "island" as a forbidden area, the Okinoshima of Munakata Taisha, belief in mountains such as Rokko Himei Shrine and Mount Miwa, belief in fire, waterfalls, and various weather phenomena such as wind, rain, and lightning.

There is also mention of another rock-related object called Iwasaka, which is believed to be a ritual site centered on a rock. However, there is little evidence of its existence compared to Iwaza. The Nihonshoki (Chronicles of Japan) distinguishes Iwasaka from Iwaza, suggesting that it is a distinct object. A banjiki, on the other hand, is similar to a stone circle, an ancient ruin made of stones arranged in a ring, and serves as a boundary that marks the divine realm and preserves the sacredness of the site.

Some of the megaliths along the Kaido have Buddhism carved on them, and some have legends attached to them, such as the famous samurai who connected horses. There is a research group (Iwakura Gakkai) claiming that the belief in rock formations and megaliths, including these, can be traced back to the Jōmon period, and that there are also artificially arranged rock formations, and that their arrangement represents certain figures, directions, or the shape of constellations. In contrast to this view, the Iwakura Society points out that it was not until the Kofun period that the Iwakura ritual began. In addition, there is criticism of the theory that megaliths are artifacts.

=== Iwasaka ===
An iwasaka (磐境) is a stone altar or mound erected as a yorishiro to call a kami for worship. The concepts of iwasaka and iwakura are so close that some suggest the two words are in fact synonymous.

== Gallery ==
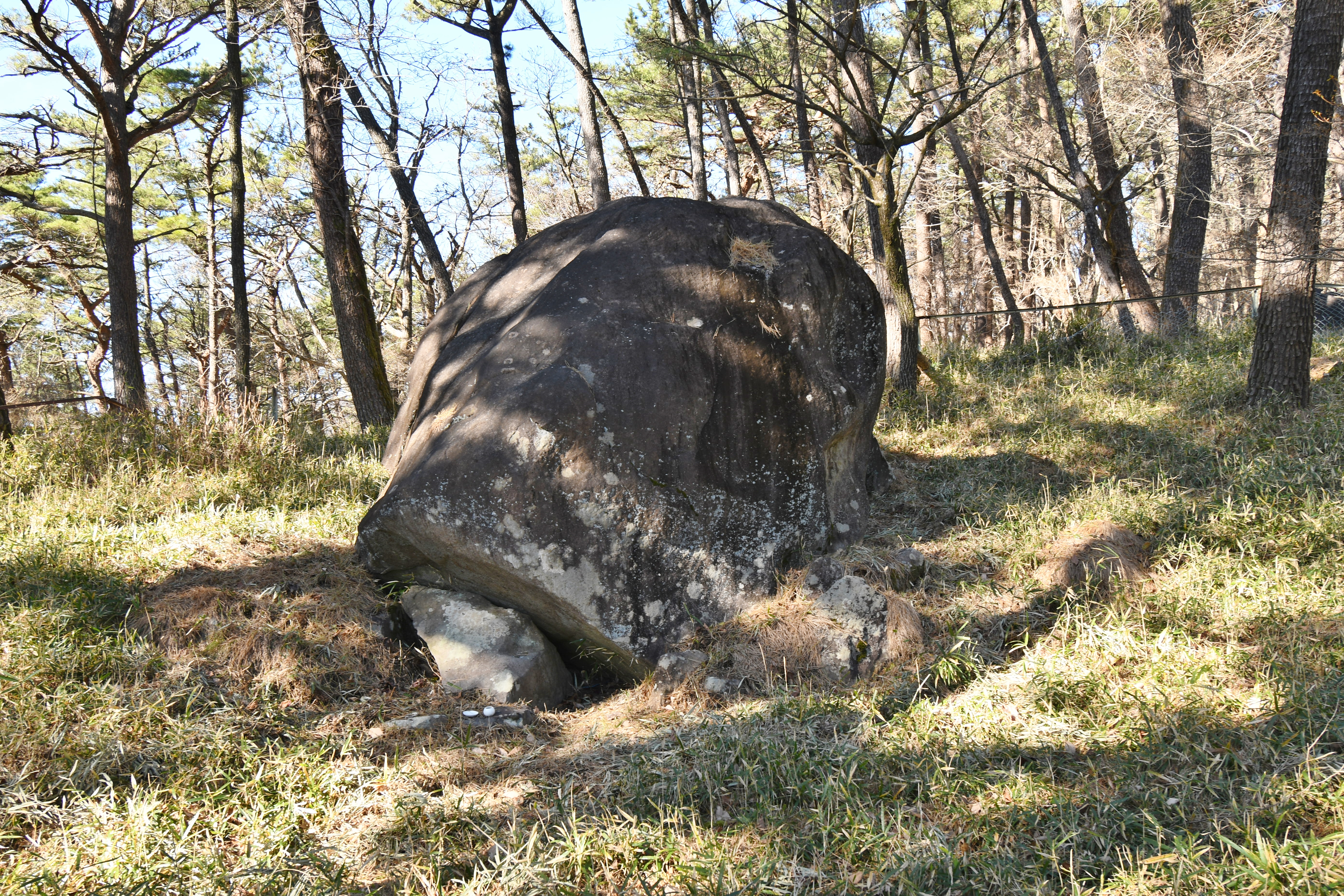
Hitsuishi ritual site

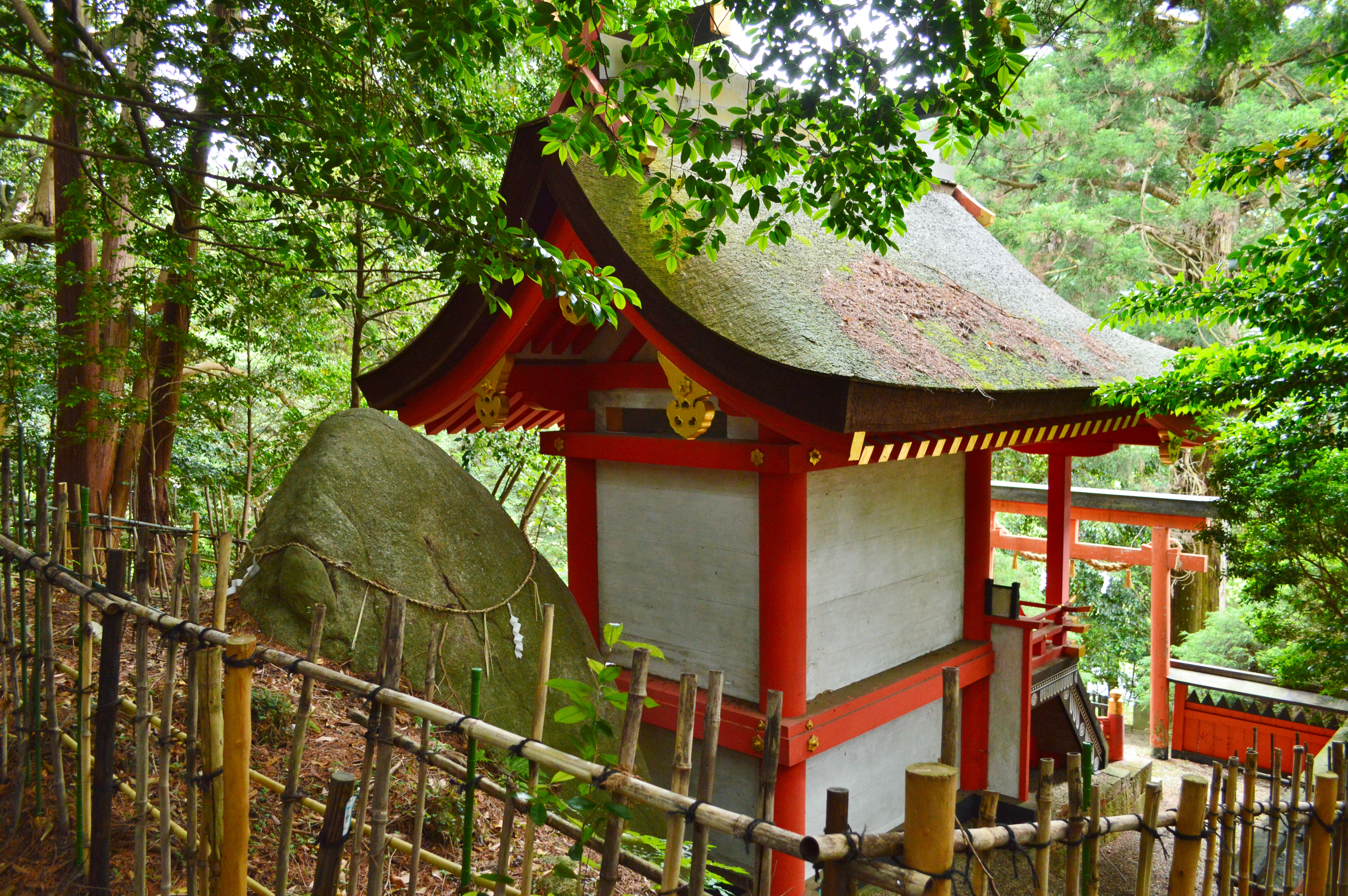
Tachiban Shrine in the precincts of Yashifun Yamaguchi Shrine (Nara City, Nara Prefecture)

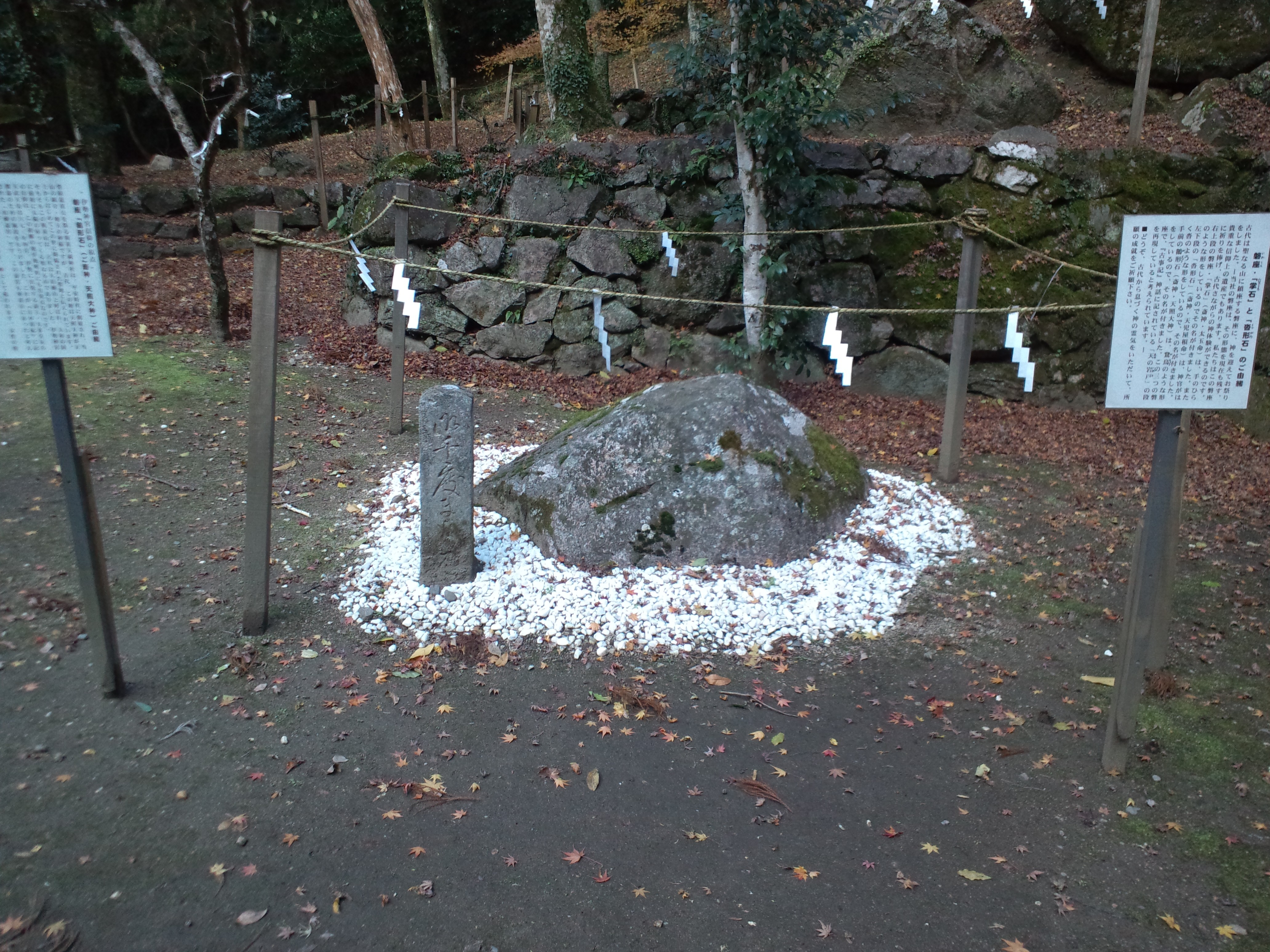
Yoiki Tenma Shrine (Sakurai City, Nara Prefecture)

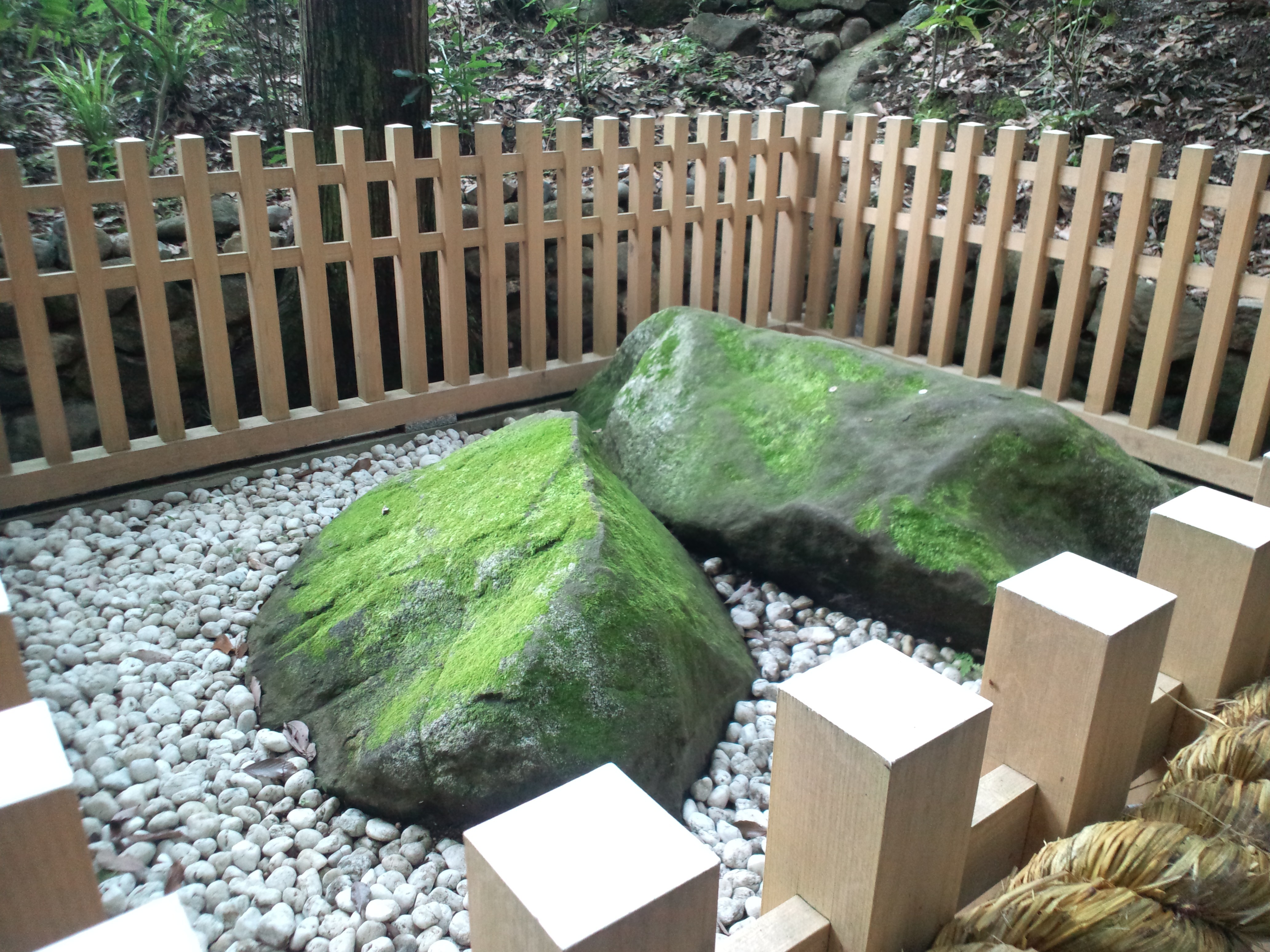
Ōmiwa Shrine (Sakurai City, Nara Prefecture)

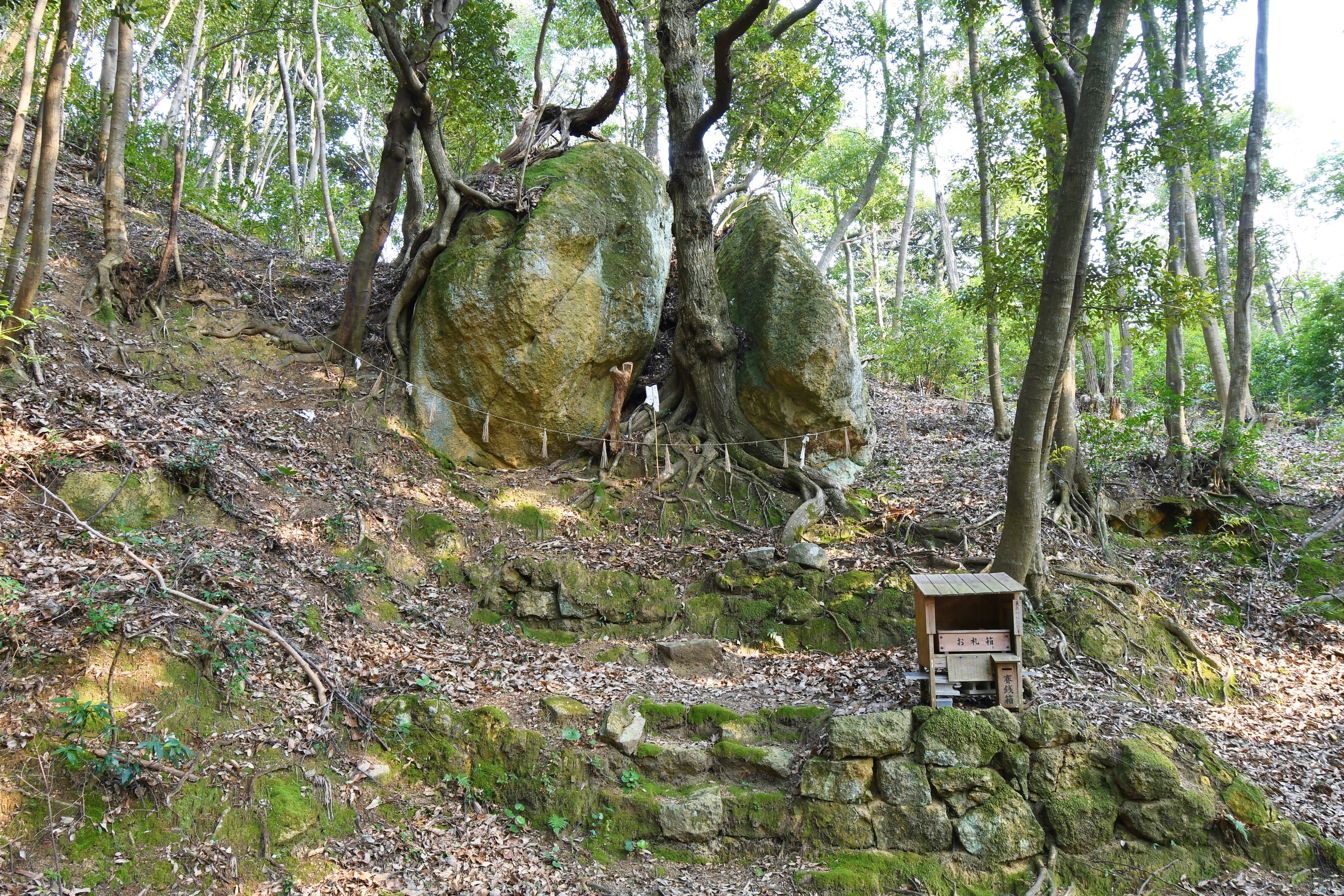
Meoto Iwa Ruins

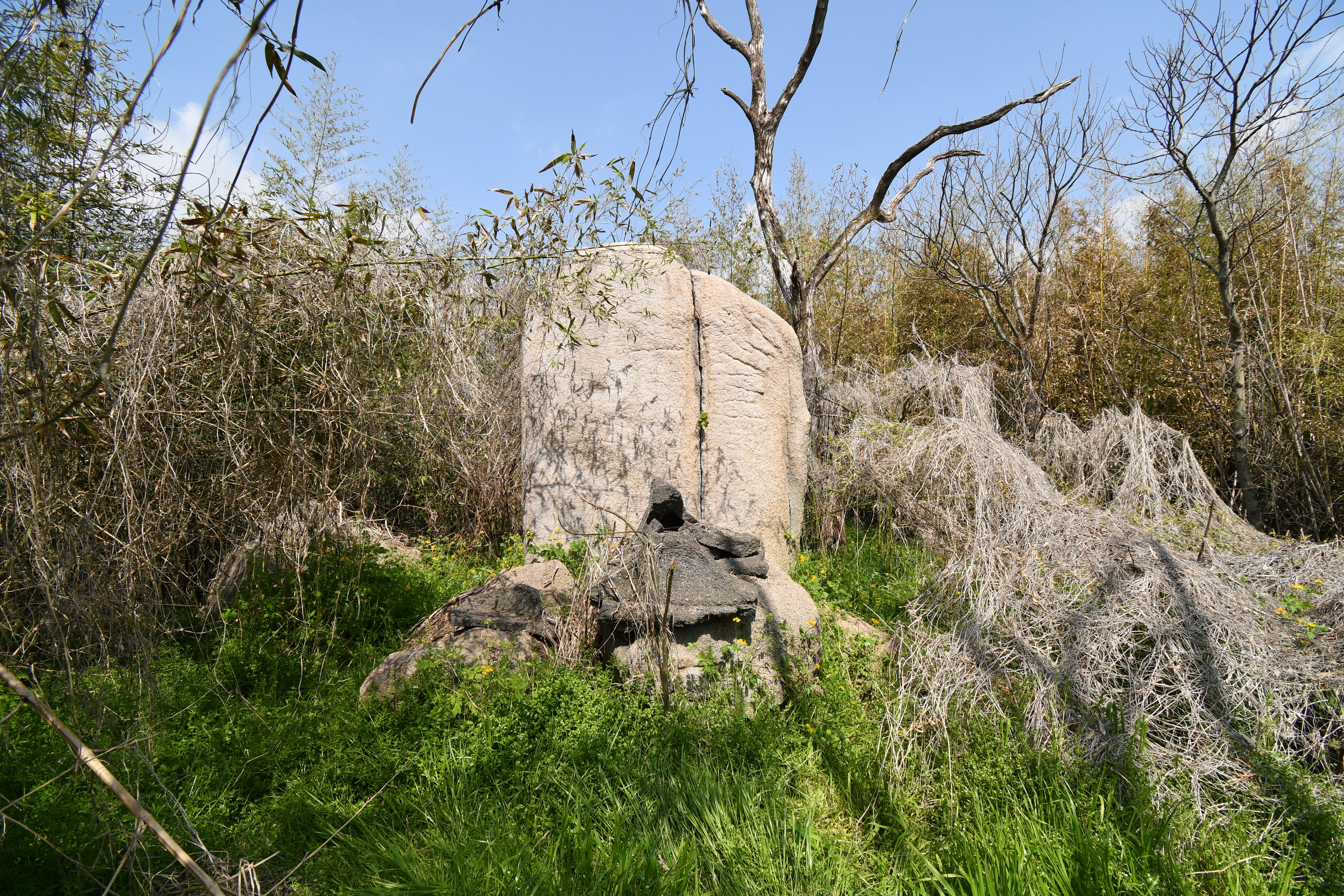
Rocks on Taka Island

== See also ==
- Shrine
- Shinto shrine
- Kamagoishi
- Himorogi
- Utaki
- Megalith
- Huaca
- Fujizuka
- Okinoshima
- Sieidi
