= Mount Miwa =

Mountain in Sakurai, Nara, Japan

- 三輪山
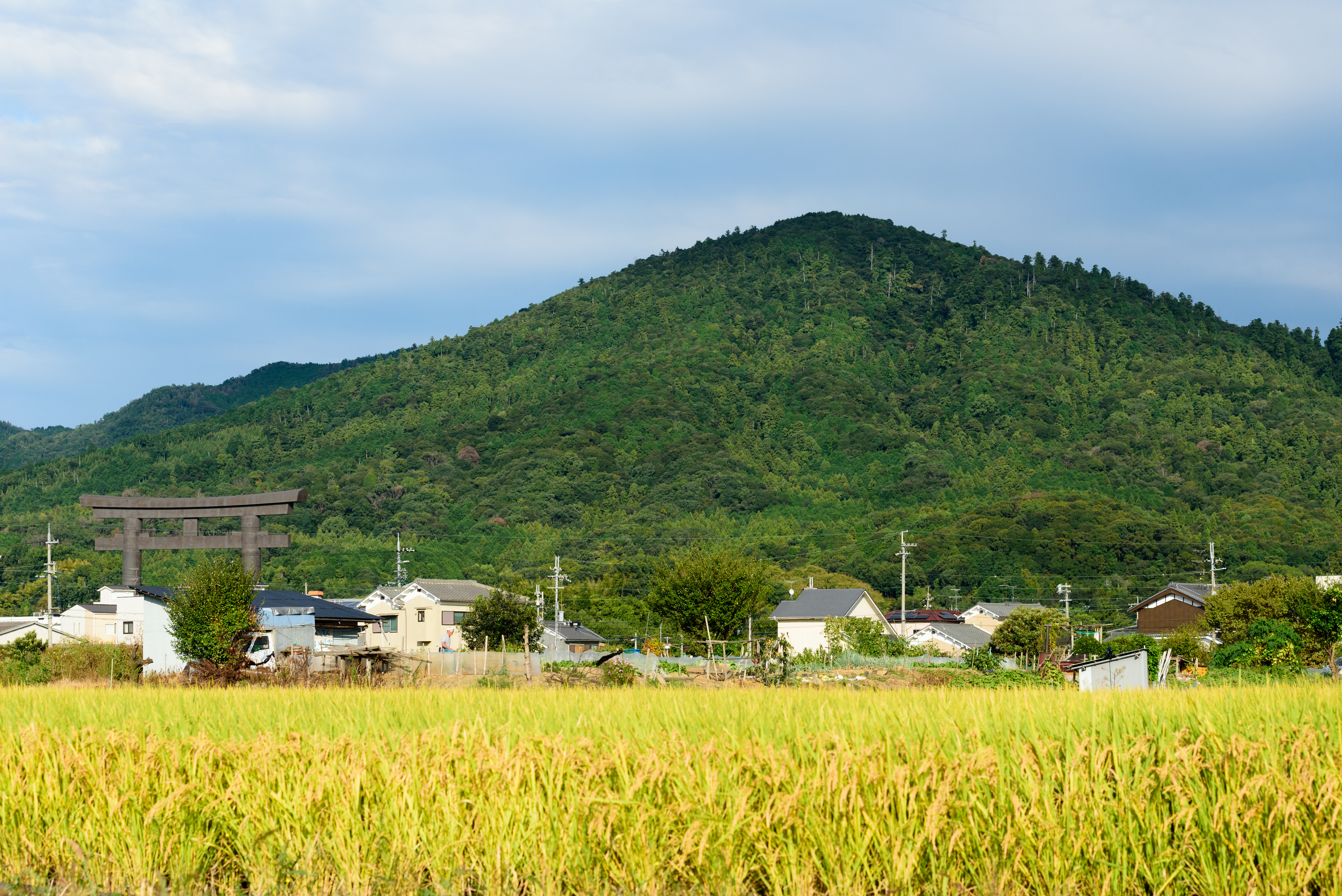

Highest point
- Elevation: 467.1 m (1,532 ft)
- Coordinates: 34°32′06″N 135°52′00″E

Naming
- Language of name: Japanese

Geography
- Location within Japan
- Location: Sakurai, Nara, Japan

Mount Miwa (三輪山, Miwa-yama) or Mount Mimoro (三諸山, Mimoro-yama) is a mountain located in the city of Sakurai, Nara Prefecture, Japan. It has been an important religious and historical mountain in Japan, especially during its early history, and serves as a holy site in Shinto. The entire mountain is considered sacred, and is home to one of the earliest Shinto shrines, Ōmiwa Shrine. Several burial mounds from the Kofun period can be found around the mountain.

The kami (spirit) generally associated with Mount Miwa is Ōmononushi (大物主) (Ōmono-nushi-no-kami), a rain kami. However, the Nihon Shoki notes that there was a degree of uncertainly when it came to naming the principal kami of Mount Miwa, but he is often linked to Ōkuninushi.

== Name ==
Mount Miwa was first described in the Kojiki as Mount Mimoro (三諸山). Both names were in common use until the reign of Emperor Yūryaku, after which Miwa was preferred. Mimoro has been held to mean something like "august, beautiful" (mi) and "room", or "hall" (moro corruption of muro). The current kanji (三) (mi) and (輪) (wa) are purely phonetic. It has also been written (三和), another a phonetic spelling with the same pronunciation.

== Early religion ==
Religious worship surrounding Mount Miwa has been deemed the oldest and more primitive of its kind in Japan, dating to pre-history. The very mountain itself is designated sacrosanct, and today's Ōmiwa Shrine still considers the mountain to be its shintai, or kami-body. The kami residing on Mount Miwa was judged the most powerful by the Fujiwara clan, and consequently palaces and roads were built in the vicinity. The saiō Princess Uji also worshipped here as opposed to Mie Prefecture.

== Pseudo-historical records ==
=== Installment of the Miwa (Ōmononushi) deity ===
The Nihon Shoki, Book V, (Chronicle of Emperor Sujin, 10th emperor) records that when the country was crippled by pestilence and subsequent mayhem, the emperor consulted the gods. The god Ōmononushi (whom some sources to the chronicle identify with the Mount Miwa deity) spoke through the mouth of an elder princess of the imperial house named Yamato-to-to-hi-momoso-hime (daughter of 7th emperor Emperor Kōrei and Sujin's aunt) and revealed himself to be the deity residing in the borders of Yamato on Mount Miwa, and promised to bring end to chaos if he were properly worshipped. The emperor propitiated to the god but the effects were not immediate. Later, the same god appeared in a dream to and instructed him to seek out a man named Ōtataneko (太田田根子), said to be the child of the god, and to install him as head priest of his cult. Subsequently, normal order was restored and crops no longer failed. Ōtataneko would become the ancestor of the Miwa clan.

=== Ōtataneko's genealogy and Miwa etymology ===
The Nihon shoki records that the first priest of the shrine, Ōtataneko declares himself the son born between the god and Ikutama yori-hime (or Ikudama-yori-bime). However, in the Kojiki, Ōtataneko identifies himself as the great-grandson (Ōtataneko and Iku-tama-yori-bime begat Kushi-mikata, who begat Iikatasumi, who begat Takemikazuchi who begat the priest Ōtataneko).

Kojiki tells how it became known Ikutama yori-hime was divinely conceived. The beautiful girl was found to be pregnant, and claimed a handsome being had come to her at night. Her parents, in order to discover the identity of the man, instructed her to sprinkle red earth by her bedside, and thread a hemp cord (or skein) with a needle through the hem of his garment. In the morning, the hemp went through the hole of the door-hook so that only "three loops" (miwa) were left. They trailed the remaining hemp thread to the shrine in the mountain, and that was how they discovered the visitation was divine.

=== Daughter of Ōmononushi of Miwa ===
The Kojiki also records another divine birth from an earlier period (under Emperor Jimmu). It tells how a maiden named Seya-datara was squatting in the toilet when the god transformed into the shape of a red-painted arrow and poked her in her privates. In astonishment, she picked up the arrow and placed it by the floor, whereby it transformed into a fine youth, who wound up marrying her. The girl child then born was named Hoto-tatara-i-susuki-hime (or Hotota-tara-i-susugi-hime), hoto being an old word for a woman's private parts.

=== Consort of the Miwa deity ===
Book V in the Nihon Shoki adds the following episode. Suijin's aunt, the aforementioned Yamato-to-to-hi-momoso-hime, was later appointed the consort or wife of Ōmononushi (Mount Miwa). The kami however, would only appear to her at night, and the princess pleaded to reveal his true form. The kami warned her not to be shocked, and agreed to show himself inside her comb box (kushi-bako (櫛箱)) or toiletry case. The next day she opened the box and discovered a magnificent snake inside. She shrieked out in surprise, whereby the deity transformed into human form, promised her payback for shaming him so, and took off to Mount Mimoro (Mount Miwa). The princess was so distraught at this, that she flopped herself on the seat stabbed herself in the pudenda with chopsticks, which ensued in her death. She is supposedly buried at one of the six mounds near Mount Miwa, the Hashihaka ("chopstick-grave") mound. The Kojiki version of this myth describes a union between a woman from the Miwa clan and Ōmononushi, resulting in the birth of an early Yamato king. Scholars note that this is a clear effort to strengthen Yamato authority by identifying and linking their lineage to the established worship surrounding Mount Miwa.

=== Emperor Yūryaku ===
In Nihon Shoki, Book XIV, under Emperor Yūryaku year 7 (purportedly 463 A.D.), it is recorded that the emperor expressed the desire to get a glimpse of the deity of Mount Mimoro (Mount Miwa) and ordered a man known for his brute strength, named Chiisakobe Sugaru (少子部蜾蠃) to go capture it. (A scholium in the codices writes the identity of the god of this mountain is said to by Ōmononushi (大物主神) by some sources, and Uda-no-sumisaka (兔田墨坂神)). Sugaru thereby climbed the mountain and captured and presented it to the emperor. But Yūryaku neglected to purify himself (by religious fasting, etc.) so that the great serpent made thunderous noise and made its eyes glare. The frightened emperor retreated to the palace, and had the snake released in the hill. He gave the hill a new name, Ikazuchi ("thunderbolt").

=== Emishi ===
Records say that Yamato Takeru's sword Kusanagi was later placed in the keeping of the Atsuta Shrine, and that Takeru also presented a number of Emishi ("barbarians") hostages he quelled to the same shrine. The priestess however found them rowdy and mannerless, and so she handed them over to the imperial court. The court settled them around the Mount Miwa area at first, but they would chopped down its trees, or make great hollers and frightened the villages. So their numbers were scattered and settled in five provinces, and they became the ancestors of the Saeki clans (Recorded in Nihongi Book VII, Emperor Keikō year 51 (purportedly 121 A.D.).

Much later in time, during Emperor Bidatsu year 10 (581 A.D.), Nihon Shoki, Book XX), the Emishi were harassing the borderlands. The emperor summoned their leader named Ayakasu, and threatened the ringleaders of the ruffians with death. Whereby Ayakasu and the others entered Hatsuse-gawa (upper stream of Yamato River, sipped its water, and facing towards Mount Mimoro (Mt. Miwa), swore allegiance unto their descendants to the Yamato court.

== Archaeology ==
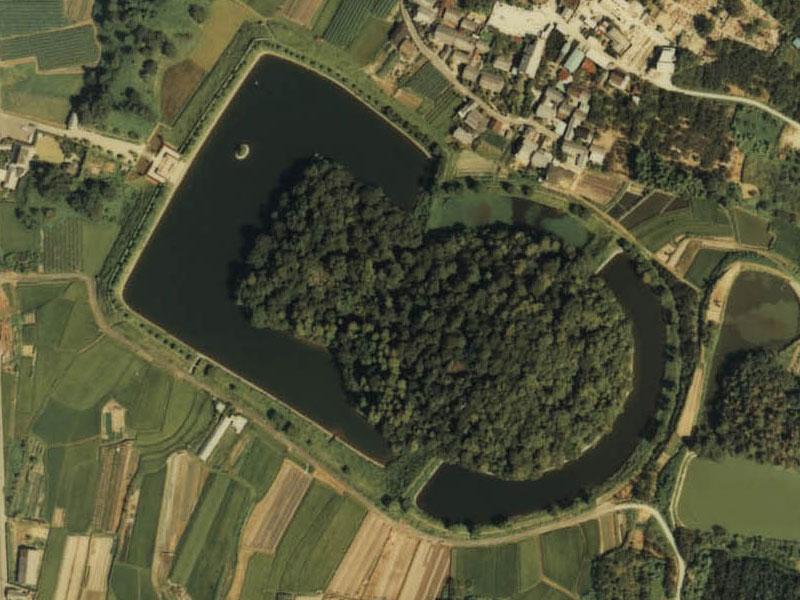
The Andōyama burial mound

Yamato leaders often ruled from palaces near sacred mountains, and built burial mounds around them, as it was a prominent sanctuary for both locals and Yamato kings alike.

Six tumuli have been found in the Shiki area at the base of Mount Miwa. These earthen mounds were built between 250 AD to 350 AD, and all display the same keyhole shape and stone chambers found in earlier mounds. However, the tumuli found at Mount Miwa hint at the beginning of a more centralized Yamato state. All six mounds are exceptionally large, twice as large as any similar mounds found in Korea, and contain prolific amounts of mirrors, weapons, ornaments, as well as finely built wood and bamboo coffins.

They are as follows, in order of discovery:

Name	Japanese	Size (length)	Location	Notes
Hashihaka mound	箸墓古墳	280m	Sakurai	Said to be grave of Princess Yamato-to-to-hi-momoso-hime
Nishitonozuka mound	西殿塚古墳	230m	Tenri	
Chausuyama mound	茶臼山古墳	207m	Sakurai	
Mesuriyama mound	メスリ山古墳	240m	Sakurai	
Andōyama mound	行燈山古墳	242m	Tenri	Sometimes called the tomb of Emperor Sujin
Shibutani-mukō mound	渋谷向山古墳	310m	Tenri	Sometimes called the tomb of Emperor Keikō

Religious objects and pottery have also been found on and around the mountain.

== Cultural references ==
- Mount Miwa was the subject of a waka poem by Princess Nukata, found in the Man'yōshū
- Mount Miwa was the site of a kendo tournament in Yukio Mishima's novel, Runaway Horses.

== Geography ==
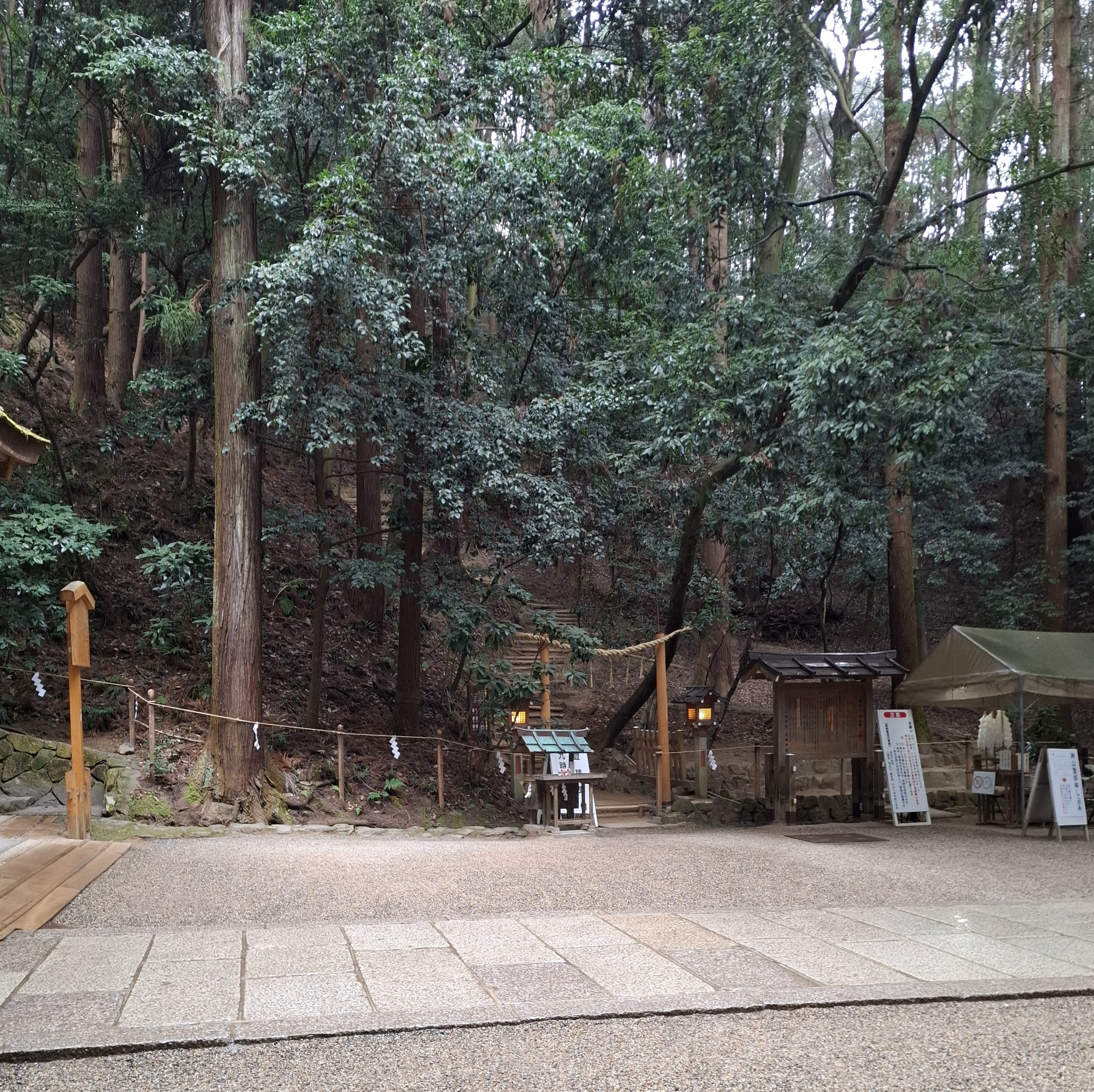
The entrance to Mount Miwa at Sai Jinja

Japanese cedar (Cryptomeria; Japanese: sugi) grows all over the mountain and is considered a holy tree.

Situated in Sakurai, Nara Prefecture, Mount Miwa's elevation reaches approximately 467 meters. The mountain features numerous manmade earthen mounds which are listed in the Archaeology section of this article.

There are 9 location markers (居場所確認標) along the footpath from Sai Jinja (狭井神社; elevation: 80 metres) to the summit of Mount Miwa:

1. Maruta Hashi 丸太橋 (Maruta Bridge)
2. Naka no Sawa 中の沢 ("Central Ford")
3. Sankō no Taki 三光の瀧 (Sankō Falls; elevation: 270 metres)
4. Mizu-nomi-dai 水吞台 ("Water Drinking Platform")
5. Nakatsu Iwakura 中津磐座 (elevation: 364.5 metres; 102.6 metres of further ascent to reach the summit)
6. Karasu-san-shō no Mori 烏山椒の森 (Karasu Sanshō Forest)
7. Komorebi-saka こもれび坂
8. Kō-no-miya Jinja 高宮神社 (Yashiro-mae やしろ前) (elevation: 446.7 metres)
9. Okitsu Iwakura 奥津磐座 (elevation: 467.1 metres) (Note: 奥 has the reading oki instead of the usual standard Japanese reading oku.)

== See also ==
- Jōmon period
- Kofun period
- Ko-Shintō
- List of mountains and hills of Japan by height
- Ōmiwa Shrine
- Ōmononushi
