= Shintai =

Objects worshipped at or near Shinto shrines

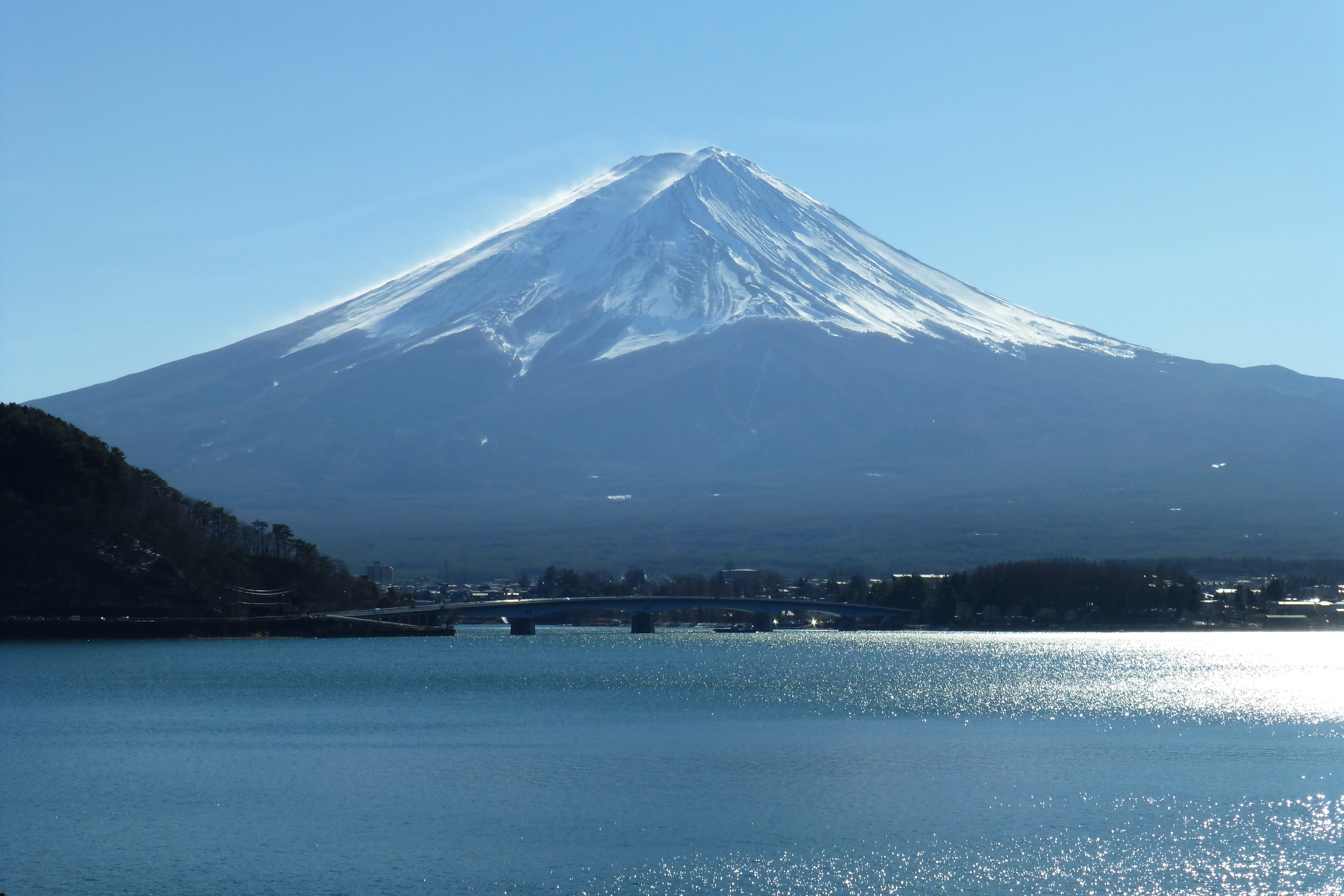
Mount Fuji is one of Japan's shintai.

In Shinto, shintai (神体; "body of the kami"), or go-shintai (御神体; "sacred body of the kami") when the honorific prefix go- is used, are physical objects worshipped at or near Shinto shrines as repositories in which spirits or kami reside. Shintai used in Shrine Shinto (Jinja Shinto) can be also called mitamashiro (御霊代; "spirit replacement" or "substitute").

In spite of what their name may suggest, shintai are not themselves part of kami, but rather just temporary repositories which make them accessible to human beings for worship. Shintai are also of necessity yorishiro, that is objects by their very nature capable of attracting kami.

== Description ==
The most common shintai are man-made objects like mirrors, swords, jewels (for example comma-shaped stones called magatama), gohei (wands used during religious rites), and sculptures of kami called shinzō (神像), but they can be also natural objects such as rocks (shinishi (神石)), mountains (shintai-zan (神体山)), trees (shinboku (神木)), and waterfalls (shintaki (神滝)). Ritual objects prepared specifically for this purpose, such as the himorogi (a sacred enclosure of evergreen branches), the iwasaka (a stone altar), and the torimono (objects held by performers in sacred dance), are likewise classified as forms of yorishiro, reflecting the belief that kami manifest themselves through nature. Before the forcible separation of kami and Buddhas of 1868 (shinbutsu bunri) a shintai could even be the statue of a Buddhist deity.

Other shintai include the mirror Yata no Kagami (one of the Imperial Regalia of Japan), Mount Miwa, Mount Nantai, Mount Kibi no Nakayama, the Nachi Falls, and the Meoto Iwa rocks. Many mountains like Mount Miwa or the Three Mountains of Kumano (Kumano sanzan) are considered shintai and are therefore called shintaizan (神体山; shintai mountain). The most widely known and renowned shintai is Mount Fuji.

An example of a shintaizan (神体山) in a Japanese new religion is Mount Hongu (本宮山, Hongū-yama) in Ayabe, Kyoto, which is sacred to the Oomoto religion. Mount Hongu is located on the grounds of Baishō-en (梅松苑), which was declared by its founders Nao Deguchi and Onisaburo Deguchi to be the spiritual center of Japan around the turn of the 20th century.

A yokozuna, a wrestler at the top of sumo's power pyramid, is a living shintai. For this reason, his waist is circled by a shimenawa, a sacred rope which protects sacred objects from evil spirits. A kannushi, that is, a Shinto priest, can become a living shintai when a kami enters his body during religious ceremonies. In this state the person is properly termed a yorimashi; kami may similarly take possession of animals, which then serve as their familiars, known as tsukawashime or osakigami.

The founding of a new shrine requires the presence of either a pre-existing, naturally occurring shintai (for example a rock or waterfall housing a local kami), or of an artificial one, which must therefore be procured or made to the purpose. An example of the first case are the Nachi Falls, worshiped at Hiryū Shrine near Kumano Nachi Taisha and believed to be inhabited by a kami called Hiryū Gongen. In the second, the mitama (spirit) of a kami is divided in half through a process called kanjō and one of the halves is then stored in a yorishiro. This is the process which has led to the creation of networks of shrines housing the same kami, as for example the Hachiman shrine, Inari shrine or Kumano shrine networks.

Because over the years the shintai is wrapped in more and more layers of precious cloth and stored in more and more boxes without being ever inspected, its exact identity may become forgotten.

The first role of a shrine is to house and protect its shintai and the kami which inhabits it. If a shrine has more than one building, the one containing the shintai is called honden; because it is meant for the exclusive use of the kami, it is always closed to the public and is not used for prayer or religious ceremonies. The shintai leaves the honden only during festivals (matsuri), when it is put in a "divine palanquin" (mikoshi, a term usually translated in English as "portable shrine"), and carried around the streets among the faithful. The portable shrine is used to physically protect the shintai and to hide it from sight.

== Examples ==
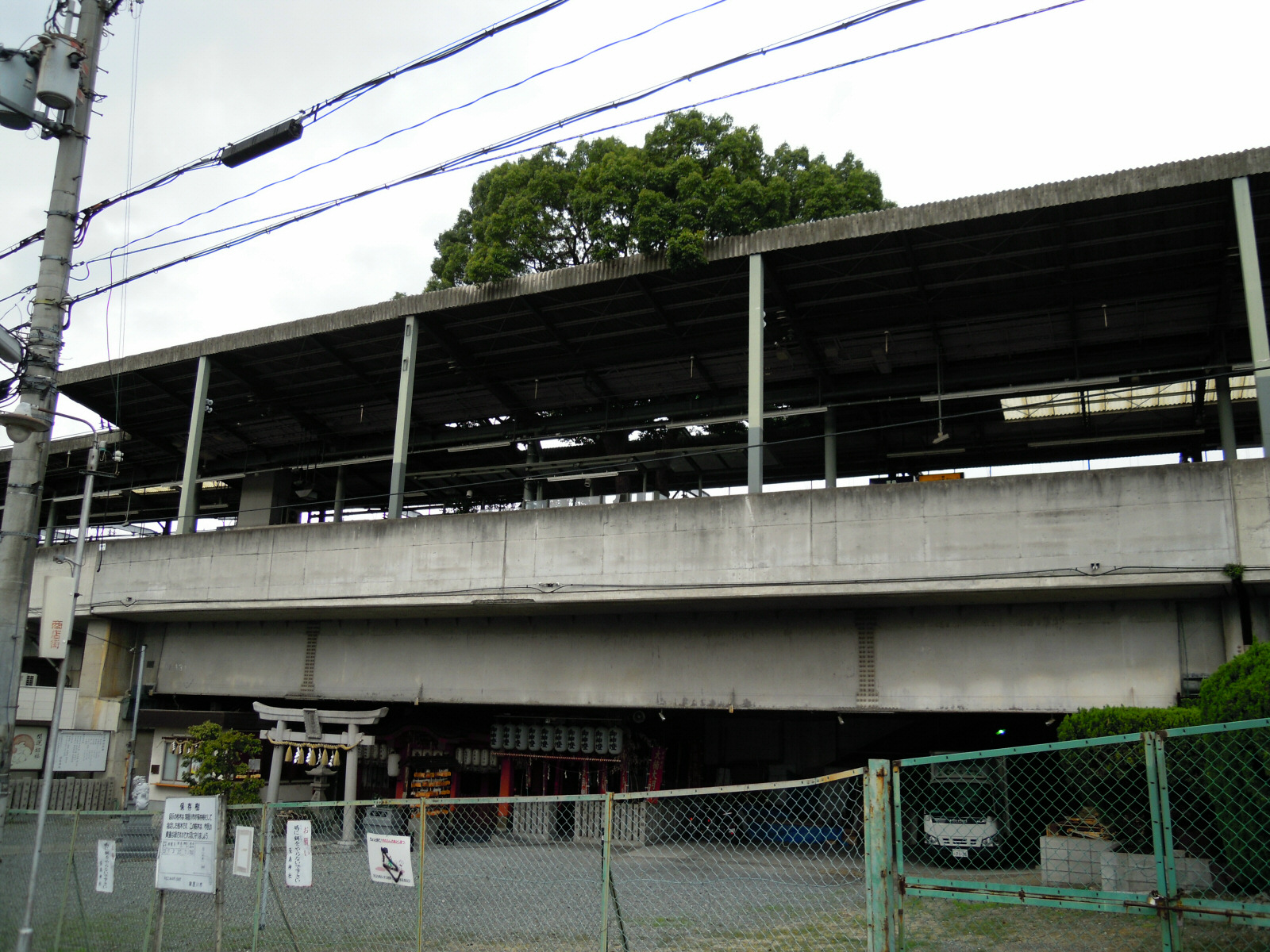
Camphor sacred tree with shrine at the base at Kayashima Station

An example of the importance of a sacred tree is the 700-year-old camphor growing in the middle of Kayashima Station. Locals protested against moving the tree when the railway station had to be expanded, so the station was built around it.

== See also ==
- Fetishism
- Glossary of Shinto
- Sacred tree
- Tree of life
- Huaca
- Types of Shintai
  - Iwakura rock
  - Kannabi
  - Shinboku
- Yorishiro
