= Sandō =

Road approaching either a Shinto shrine or a Buddhist temple

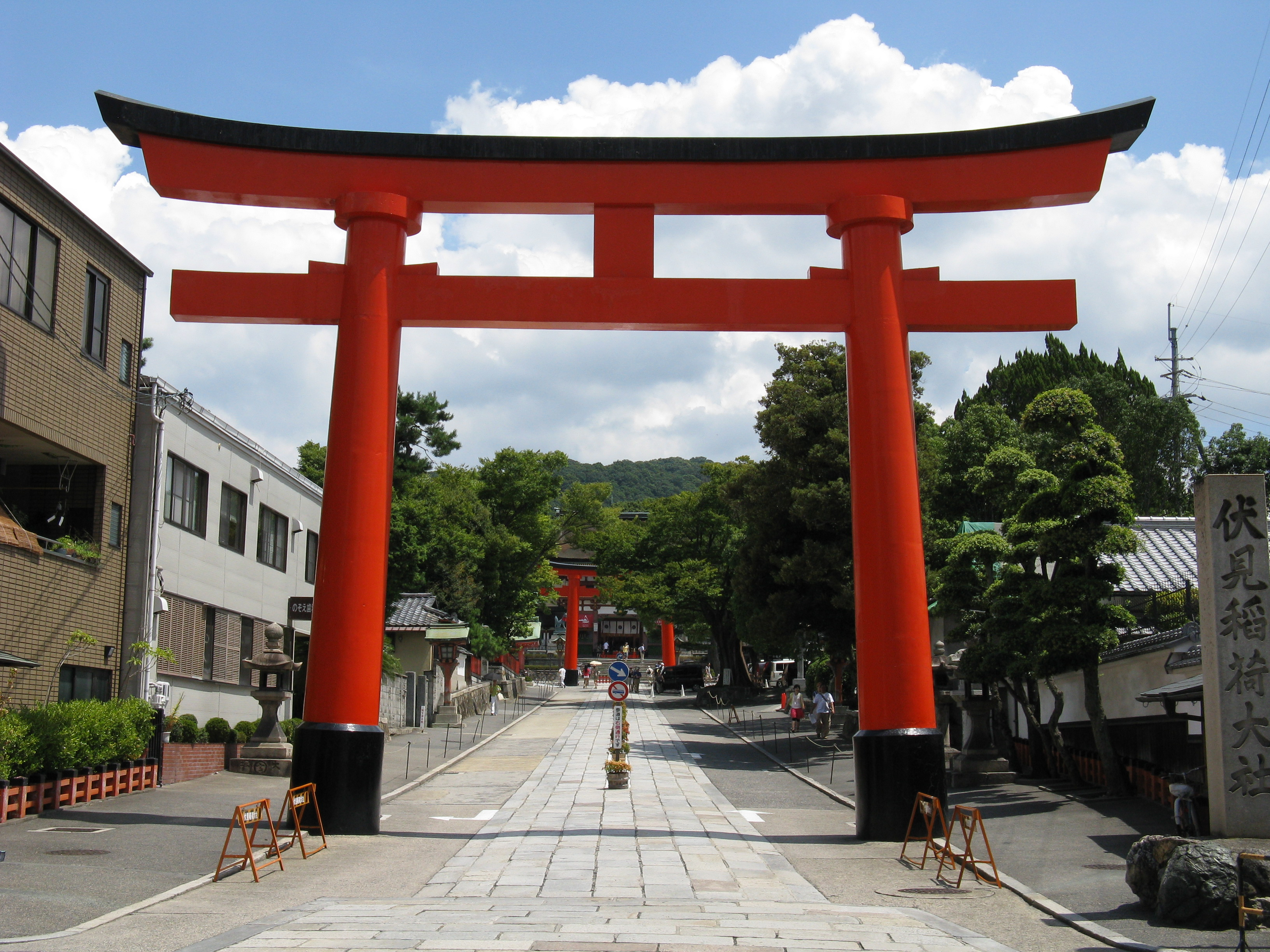
The sandō at Fushimi Inari Taisha in Kyoto

A sandō (参道; visiting path) in Japanese architecture is the road approaching either a Shinto shrine or a Buddhist temple. Its point of origin is usually straddled in the first case by a Shinto torii, in the second by a Buddhist sanmon, gates which mark the beginning of the shrine's or temple territory. The word dō (道) can refer both to a path or road, and to the path of one's life's efforts. There can also be stone lanterns and other decorations at any point along its course.

A sandō can be called a front sandō (表参道, omote-sandō), if it is the main entrance, or a rear sandō (裏参道, ura-sandō) if it is a secondary point of entrance, especially to the rear; side sandō (脇参道, waki-sandō) are also sometimes found. The famous Omotesandō district in Tokyo, for example, takes its name from the nearby main access path to Meiji Shrine where an ura-sandō also used to exist.

== Gallery ==
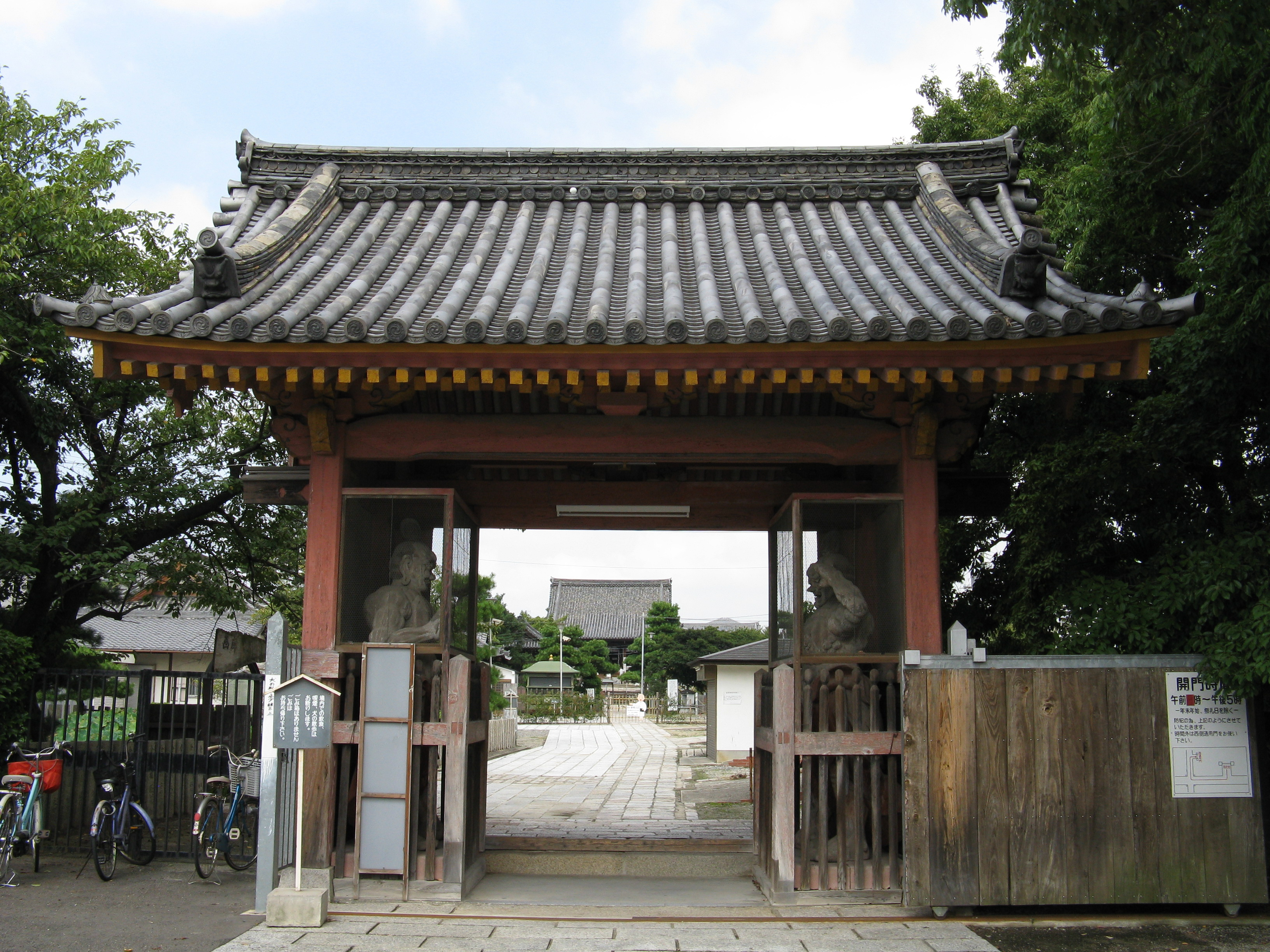
A Buddhist sandō

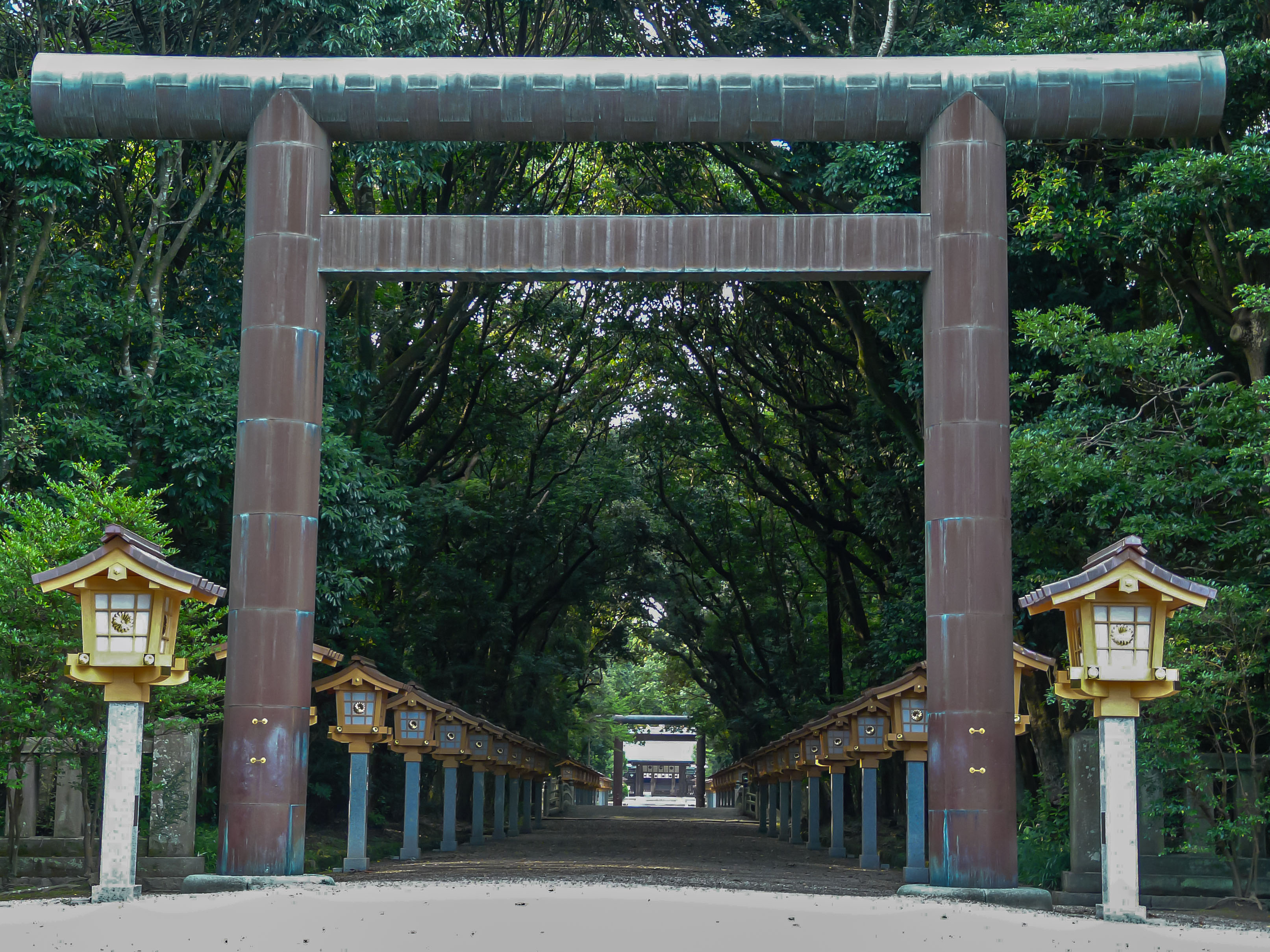
The sandō at Miyazaki Jingū

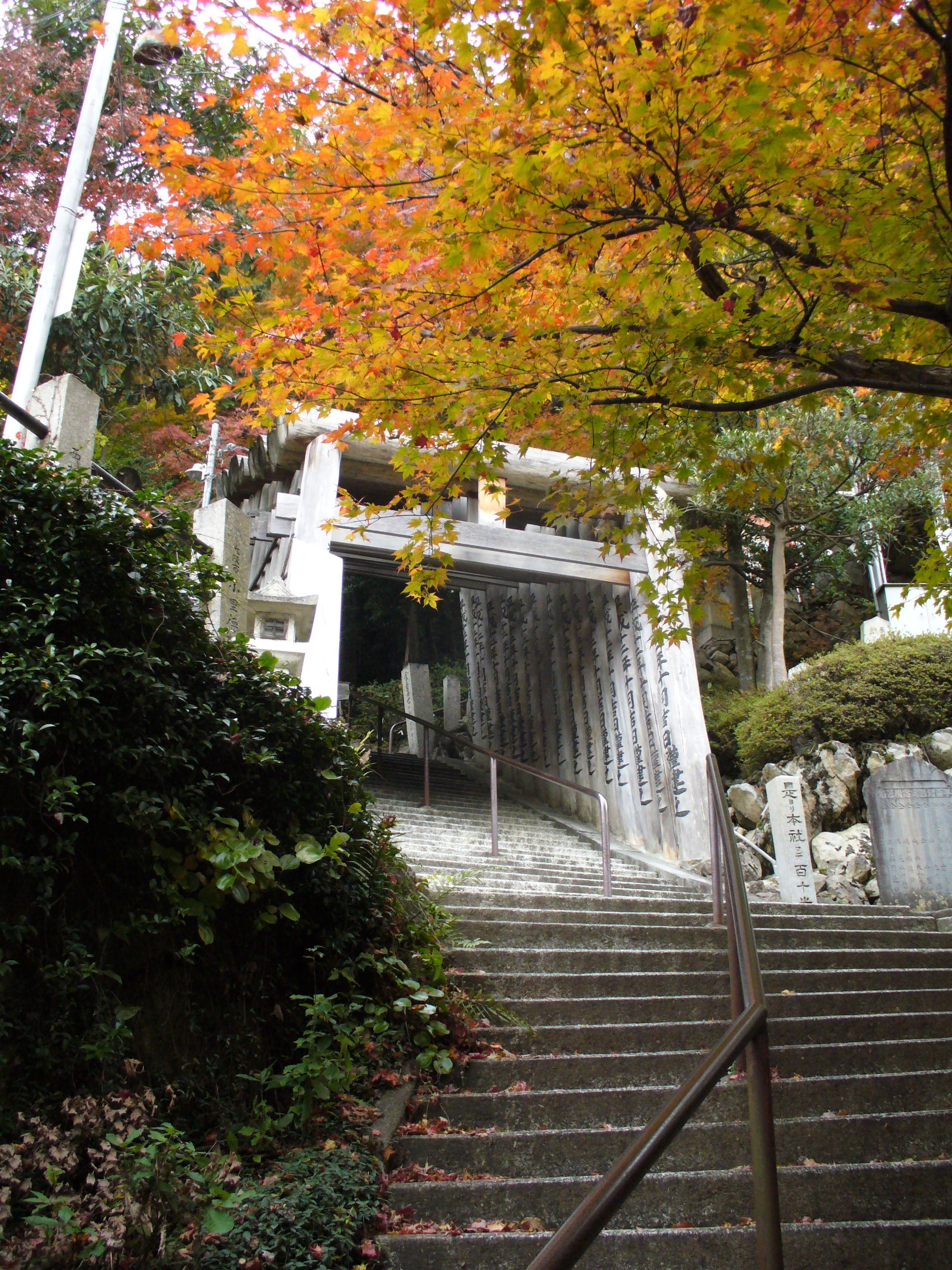
A sandō with stairs

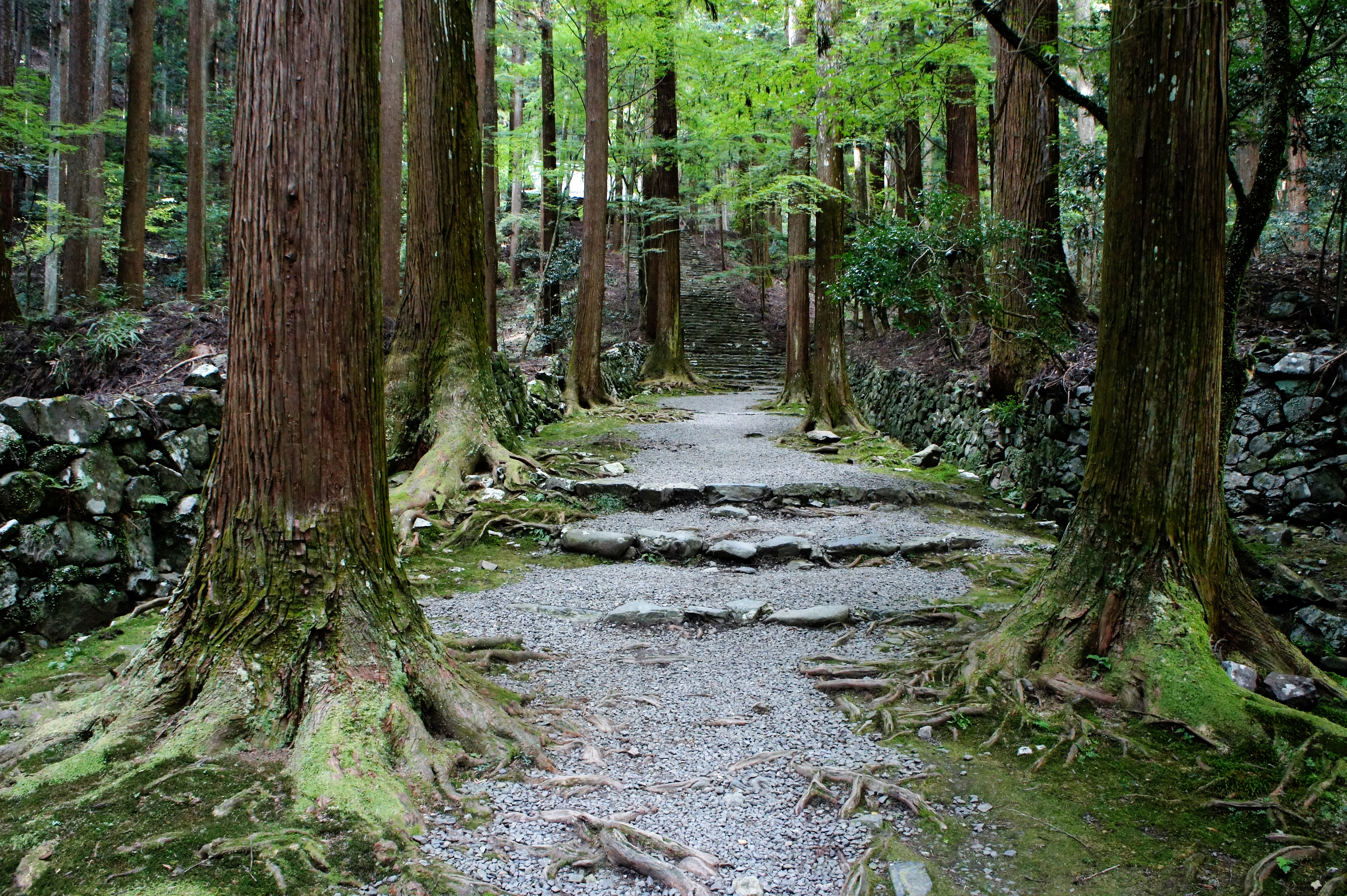
The sandō at Kōzan-ji, Kyoto

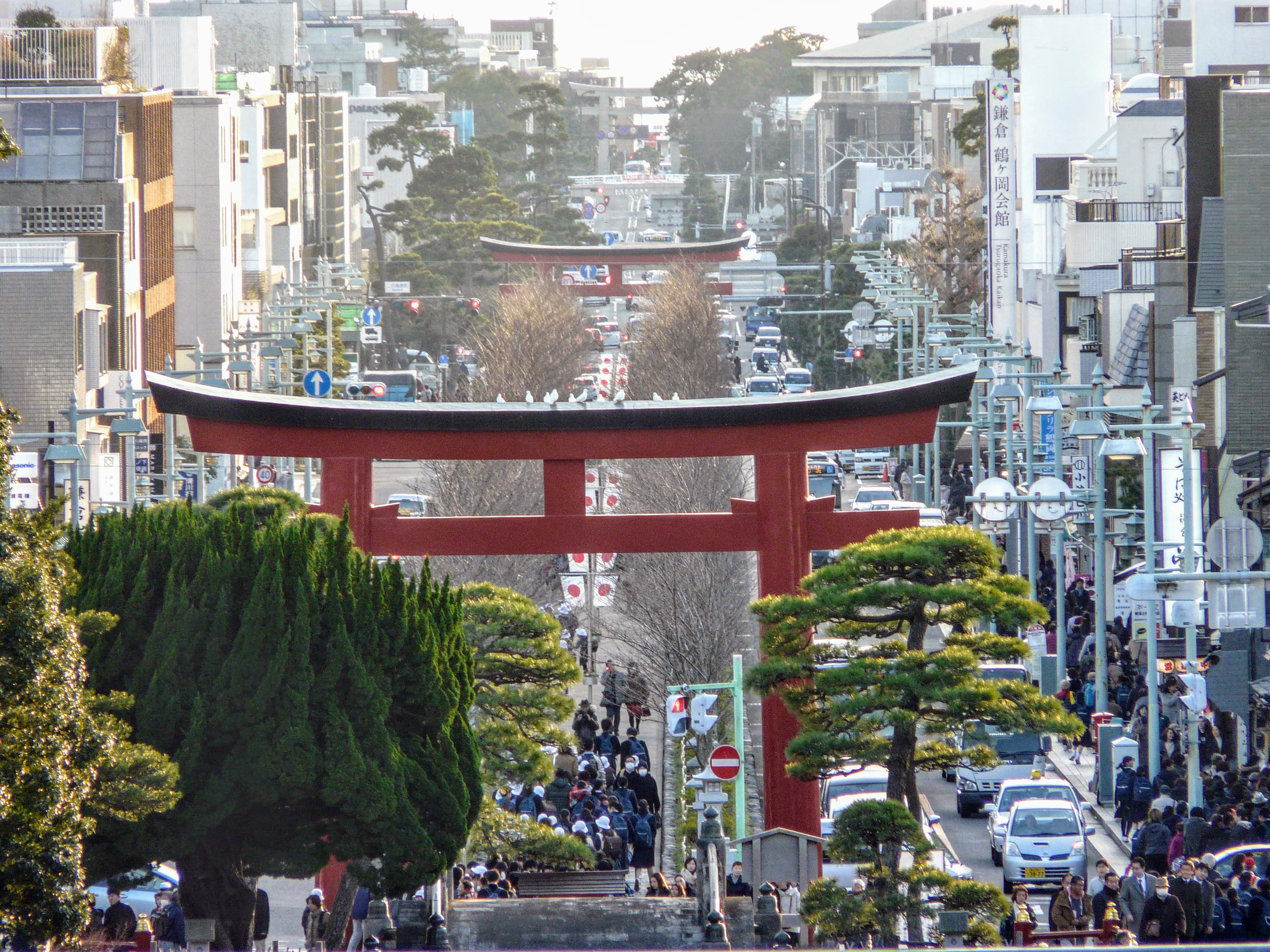
The sandō at Tsurugaoka Hachimangū, Kamakura

== See also ==
- Shendao, a decorated road to a grave of an emperor or another dignitary in China
- Glossary of Shinto
