= Ko-Shintō =

Animistic religion of Jōmon-period Japan

Ko-Shintō (古神道) refers to the animist religion of Japan before Buddhism and other foreign religions like Confucianism. Koshinto is the alleged basis of modern Shinto. The search for traces of Koshintō began with the "Restoration Shinto" in the Edo period, whose goal was to remove any foreign ideas and worldviews from Shinto (specifically referring to Buddhism). Some movements which claim to have discovered this primeval way of thought are Oomoto and Izumo-taishakyo.

== Worldview ==
The following is deduced from studying the language of the Kojiki and Nihon Shoki which does not appear in any Chinese philosophy:

In Koshintō, the present world or utsushiyo is put in contrast to the eternal world or tokoyo. All individuals possess a tamashii, meaning a mind, heart, or soul. A tamashii without a body is called a mitama. Those whose tamashii has the nature of kami are called mikoto.

In the Age of the Kami, or Kamiyo, the Earth was ruled by kami, whose forms were akin to humans, but had pure hearts and spoke in the language of kotodama.

== History of Koshintō research ==
There are no records of "pure" Koshintō in early Japanese literature. By the time Japan was producing literature, its native religion had already intermixed with Taoism and Buddhism. Medieval development meant that Shinto was integrated into Buddhist symbology.

Koshintō research began at the same time as examinations into Early Buddhism. In this era, Japan's shrine rituals were being "purified" of their religious nature and turned into national forms, a process called State Shinto today. Religionists began looking for the origin of these forms in a primitive "nature religion". Early folklorists such as Kunio Yanagita were also seeking a purely Japanese tradition.

Onisaburo Deguchi, the founder of Oomoto, was an extremely influential Koshinto researcher in the Imperial period. He influenced nearly all modern Koshinto lines except for that of Takuma Hisa. Such research continues today and is often connected with aikido and other martial arts.

== See also ==
- Ainu religion, another indigenous religion of Japan
- Fukko Shinto
- Haibutsu kishaku
- Himorogi
- Kotoamatsukami
- Meiteism
- Modern paganism
- Ryukyuan religion
- Shinbutsu bunri
- Shinbutsu kakuri
