= Chinju no mori =

Japanese sacred forest

A forest of a Shinto shrine surrounded by rice paddies (Kasuga Shrine, Kawakita, Tamba Sasayama City, Hyōgo Prefecture). Similar landscapes are still widely found in rice-growing areas in Japan.

Chinju-no-mori (鎮守の森) are forests established and maintained in or around shrines (Chinjugami) in Japan, surrounding temples, Sando, and places of worship.

== Meaning ==
Chinju no mori refers to the forest or grove that surrounded many Shinto shrines. The character for mori is often used. In some cases, the word shrine is written and read as mori, suggesting that Shrine Shinto was derived from Koshinto. The character mori (杜) is often used in the names of Shrines. In this case it refers to a place where a kami is present. It can therefore be a shrine and, in fact, the characters 神社, 社 and 杜 can all be read "mori" ("grove"). This reading is present in the Man'yōshū. This reading reflects the fact the first shrines were simply sacred groves or Chinju no Mori where kami were present.

In modern Shinto, the shintai of Shrine Shinto is understood to be the shrine, such as the main hall and Shinto architecture, which are covered with shimenawa, and the surrounding forests are understood to be the chinju-no-mori. In Koshinto, which is the original source of shinto, there are Himorogi, Iwakura, forests, land covered with forests, mountains (such as Mount Fuji, etc.), megaliths, seas, rivers (characteristic places such as reefs and waterfalls), and nature itself is an object of faith. In many shrine precincts and in the mountains, trees with distinctive trunks and branches and large trees are worshipped as sacred trees.

Most Shinto shrines were originally built in such a Shinto shrine or on the border between the everlasting world and the present world, where there is a sacred stone or rock. In the same way as in the ancient Shinto religion, shrines like Omiwa Shrine in Nara Prefecture, which worships Mount Miwa, the mountain itself is considered the Shintai. Some shrines do not even have a main shrine or a Honden, and some use forests and hills as their sacred objects, thus preserving the ancient Shinto religion, which is also known as nature worship and spirit worship in Japan.

According to Akira Miyawaki, "chinju no mori" is used as an academic term by the International Society of Vegetation Science.。

=== Planted Chinju no mori ===
Contrary to these examples, there are also examples of Chinju no mori forests created for shrines via afforestation. The most famous example is Meiji Shrine. Some trees were brought in as donations from Taiwan and other countries, but the basic policy is to give consideration to the vegetation (potential natural vegetation) that should originally exist in the area, and the forest was planned to look like a natural shrine forest through natural renewal in the future. The plan is designed to make the forest look like a natural township forest through natural renewal in the future. In addition, when Kasugayama Primeval Forest was registered as a World Heritage Site, this point was taken into consideration and it was designated as a cultural heritage site instead of a natural heritage site.

== Vegetation ==
It is believed that the township forests have been preserved as such since ancient times. Therefore, its forest vegetation is considered to have preserved the original vegetation of the area, the so-called original vegetation. Today, when the surrounding nature is often destroyed, township forests are often one of the few clues to the former nature of the area. For this reason, in forest ecology in Japan, the township forests are emphasized, called shrine forests or shrine and temple forests, and are often the subject of surveys. In many cases, they are confirmed to be valuable in the process and are protected as natural monuments or the like. In this sense, the forests associated with Utaki in Okinawa are similar.

However, it should not be assumed that the original vegetation has been fully preserved. When surrounding areas are developed and only the chinju forest remains isolated, what was once a broad, continuous ecosystem becomes fragmented into smaller sections.

As a result, the overall habitat area is reduced, and some species may no longer be able to sustain viable population . The topography of the area may not include areas along mountain streams, and many areas will be lost from the communities that existed in ancient times. This will also cause aridification and other changes. Some areas are changed by such changes, and some species are newly invaded. For example, camphora, which is often seen in shrines, is not thought to have originally been found in the forests of central and southern Japan. Also, deciduous trees such as Keyaki and Mucunoki should not occur much in the climax community south of the plains in central Honshu.

Furthermore, in such fragmented vegetation, the animals that live there often do not have enough room to move around to maintain their populations, and the animal communities are thought to be more degraded than the plant communities. Since many plants require specific animals for pollen vectoring, seed dispersal, etc., it can be said that the degradation of animal communities is related to the transformation of the vegetation itself in various ways.

Direct human disturbance also takes place. Often, non-wild plants are planted in the precincts. Also, when a tree falls in the forest, the gap created by the fall (in ecological terms gap) is often filled by planting cedar or cypress. There are reports of advanced use of forest resources in the precincts as early as the early modern period.。In recent years, some forests have been undercut and raked for leaves, but this kind of maintenance is not necessary, and if done in natural forests, it can lead to increased devastation. In addition, forests are often cut off from their surroundings or mowed around them due to road expansions, etc. In such cases, the forests are often destroyed by clumps or mantle communities. In such cases, forests that have lost their mantle and sod communities are prone to drying out of the forest floor, which can lead to devastation. In addition, concrete spraying is increasingly used for restoration of these areas, which is an easy and inexpensive method that does not allow for natural recovery.

Nevertheless, unlike so-called satoyamas, these forests are familiar to people, but they are treated differently from forests that are tended to for human use, and they continue to have a certain presence.

== Decline ==
In modern times, the belief in shinto deities has become more abstract, and the reverence for the dense forests of Shinto shrines has waned, with many believers, such as Ujiko, not necessarily considering them necessary. While there are examples where the core shrine is so revered that the shrine forest is maintained (e.g., Meiji Jingu mentioned above, as well as Tadasu Forest in Kyoto City), there have been many cases where the shrine forest was cut down to make room for road repairs, agricultural and residential land development, and public facilities such as daycare centers. In particular, in urban areas, forests were often cut down. In some cases, especially in urban areas, forests have been completely lost. There are shrines that consist entirely of torii gates and main shrines, and the original meaning of shrines based on nature worship has been greatly diminished.

As far back as before the Meiji era, there were shrines of various sizes in each village, and many of them had a forest for their Shinto shrine. This was greatly reduced by the so-called Jinja gōshi decree. As a result, many shrines were abolished, and at the same time, their guardian forests were cut down. Minakata Kumagusu has been opposed to Shrine merging since that time, fearing the large-scale destruction of nature that would result from this logging.

Jinja gōshi was intended to incorporate indigenous beliefs into State Shinto by organizing only one shrine per administrative village, but one theory suggests that the purpose was to gain concessions on the wood resources or by-products (camphor, etc.) of this process. It is also said that the purpose was to acquire the wood resources or by-products (such as camphor). In particular, there are many large camphor trees and tabunoki in shrines in central Honshu and southward, and there is a theory that these trees may have been treated at a high price.

On a more minor note, large plants of furan and sekkok, which used to be common on sacred trees in shrines, are rarely seen anymore due to the wildflower boom. There was a similar case in the past, when Minakata Kumagusu found a large plant of a magnificent epiphytic orchid at a shrine in Wakayama Prefecture, and happily explained it to the kannushi, who promoted it to the fullest. The goddess was very pleased with it and explained it to him. The priest was very angry with him, saying, "How dare you advertise something so rare in such a way? It will be stolen." He was angry.

== Revaluation and restoration ==
Following the conclusion of the Pacific War, widespread deforestation took place as part of national land development, separate from the state Shinto religion. This led to increased reflection on the consequences of excessive development, depopulation, and land shortage in the aftermath of the collapse of the bubble economy. This resulted in the rise of the national trust movement and other initiatives aimed at preserving and restoring forests and green spaces. The national trust movement has been successful in its efforts to conserve and rehabilitate forests and other vegetation. In the aftermath of the 2011 Tōhoku earthquake and tsunami, there has also been a push to maintain and restore the forests affected by the disaster.

== See also ==
- Chinjugami
- Chinjusha
- Satoyama
- Green conservatism
- Ko-Shintō
- Shinboku
- Himorogi
  - Shimenawa
- Bai sema
- Minakata Kumagusu
- Potential natural vegetation
- Akira Miyawaki
