= Jinushigami =

Japanese folk deities of an area

Jinushigami (地主神), also known as jigami (地神), tochigami (土地神), chi no kami (地の神; also read as ji no kami), or jinushisama (地主様), are Shinto folk deities, or kami, of an area of land (the name literally means "land-master-kami").

Their history goes back to at least the 9th century and possibly earlier. Originally, jinushigami were associated with new areas of land opened up for settlement. New residents of the land created shrines to the local resident kami either to gain its blessing/permission, or to bind it within the land to prevent its interference with, or cursing of, nearby humans. Jinushigami may be either ancestors of the original settlers of an area, or ancestors of a clan. They are also known as Landlord deities and sometimes described as genius loci.

Ōkuninushi is sometimes considered a Jinushigami of Japan as a whole.

Hokora are often created for Jinushigami, natural objects like trees are also often seen to be yorishiro or shintai for them.

The goal is to convince the cthonic deities of the ground to allow occupation.

Shinra Myōjin is considered such a deity and to have originated in Korea.

== Pop culture ==
In the manga series Kamisama Kiss by Julietta Suzuki, the heroine Nanami Momozono becomes the tochigami of a derelict shrine.

== See also ==
- Dizhu shen
- Te-ki-tsu
