= Ta-no-Kami =

Kami believed to observe the harvest of rice plants or to bring a good harvest

Ta-no-Kami (田の神) is a kami who is believed to observe the harvest of rice plants or to bring a good harvest, by Japanese farmers. Ta in Japanese means "rice fields". Ta-no-Kami is also called Noushin (kami of agriculture) or kami of peasants. Ta-no-Kami shares the kami of corn, the kami of water and the kami of defense, especially the kami of agriculture associated with mountain faith and veneration of the dead (faith in the sorei). Ta-no-Kami in Kagoshima Prefecture and parts of Miyazaki Prefecture is unique; farmers pray before Ta-no-Kami stone statues in their communities.

== Agricultural kami ==
In Japan, there are agricultural deities or kami. In the Japanese documents, Nihon Shoki and Kojiki, there were kami of rice plants, Ukano Mitama, Toyouke Bimeno Kami, and kami of corn, Ootoshino Kami. Of them, Toyouke Bimeno Kami was written also in Engishiki, and is considered to be a female kami. Generally speaking, in the Tohoku area of Japan, agriculture-related kami is Nougami (agriculture kami), in the Koshin area, it is Saku Gami, in the Kinki area, it is Tsukuri Gami, in the Tajima and Inaba areas, it is kami of 亥(i),(On the day of i, the fields are struck; which is considered to give peace on the harvest ground). In the Chugoku and Shikoku areas, it is Sanbai Sama, in Setonaikai, it is the local kami. In Eastern Japan it is associated with the Ebisu faith, and in Western Japan it is associated with the Daikoku faith.

== Festivals or ceremonies ==
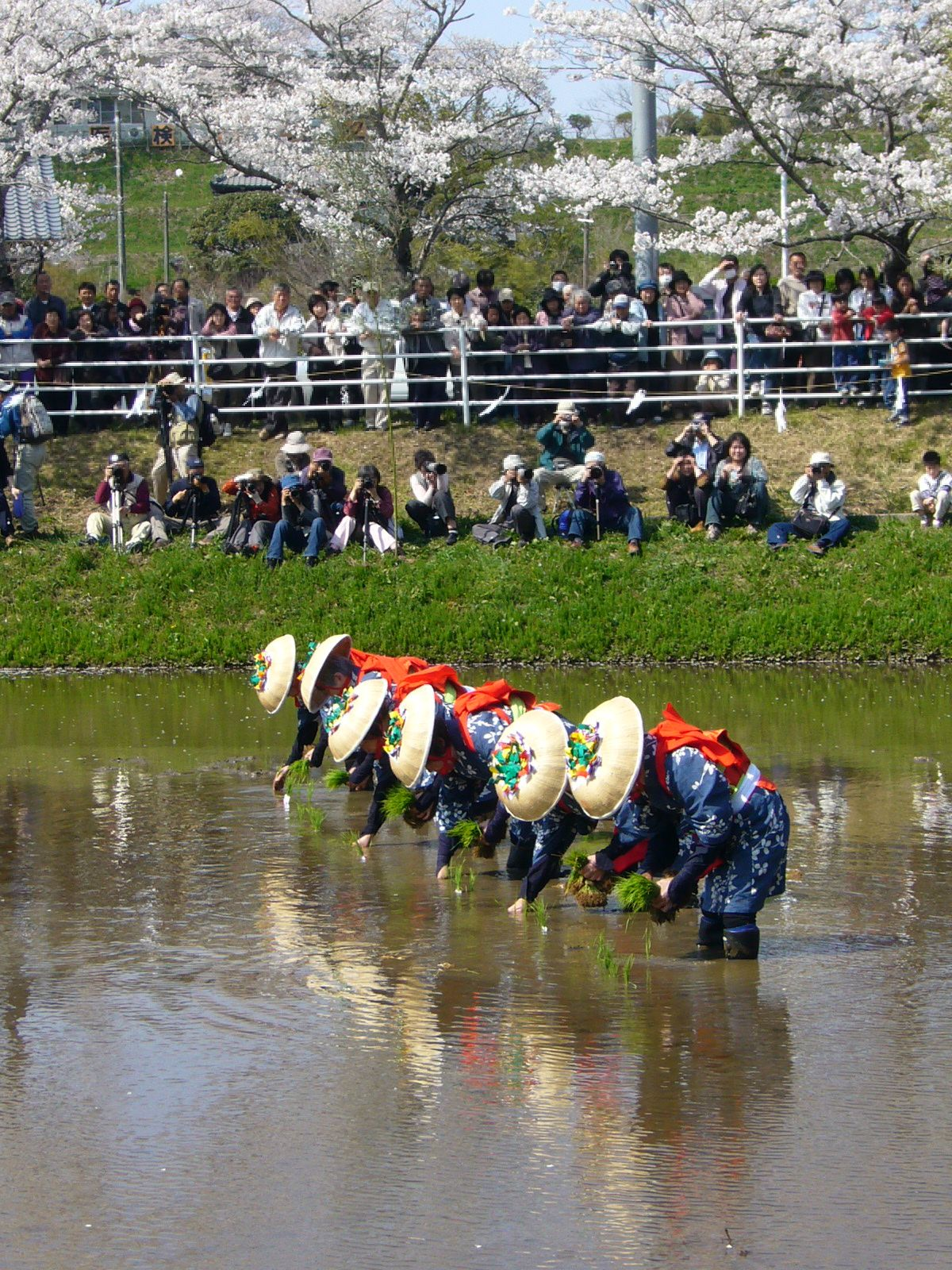
Rice transplantation festival at Katori Shrine

According to their agricultural calendars, farmers observe kami ceremonies related to Ta-no-Kami in the spring and autumn. These include the ceremony of the beginning of a year, beginning of farming in early spring, the start of rice plant farming, rice plant transplantation (accepting kami at the start of transplantation, called Saori) (sending kami at the end is called Sanaburi) and harvest time. They also pray for the elimination of disasters or harmful insects. Finally, they conduct the ceremony of thanking kami for a good harvest, The real ceremonies and their names differ from place to place, although dancing, eating a special dish or rice cakes, or visits to the community kami, and burning ceremonies are some of them. Scarecrows are variations of Ta-no-Kami, since they are expected to prevent bad spirits of animals and birds. Niinamesai is one of the festivals of the Japanese Imperial family, the eating of freshly harvested rice with kami, a variation of the festivals of Ta-no-Kami. Previously it had been a national holiday.

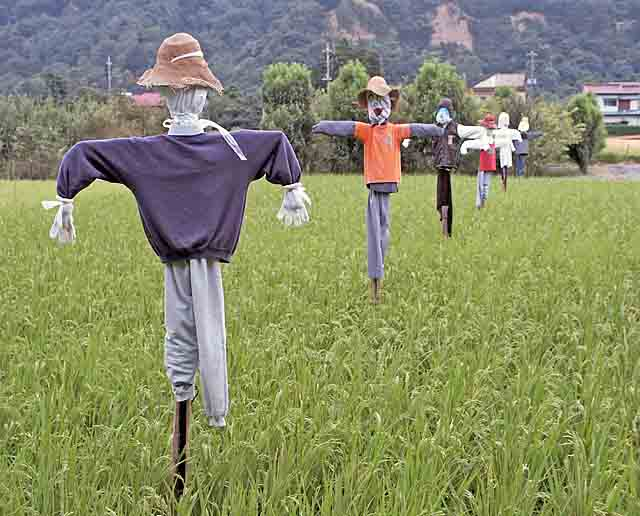
Scarecrows in a rice paddy

== Fox and inari shrine ==
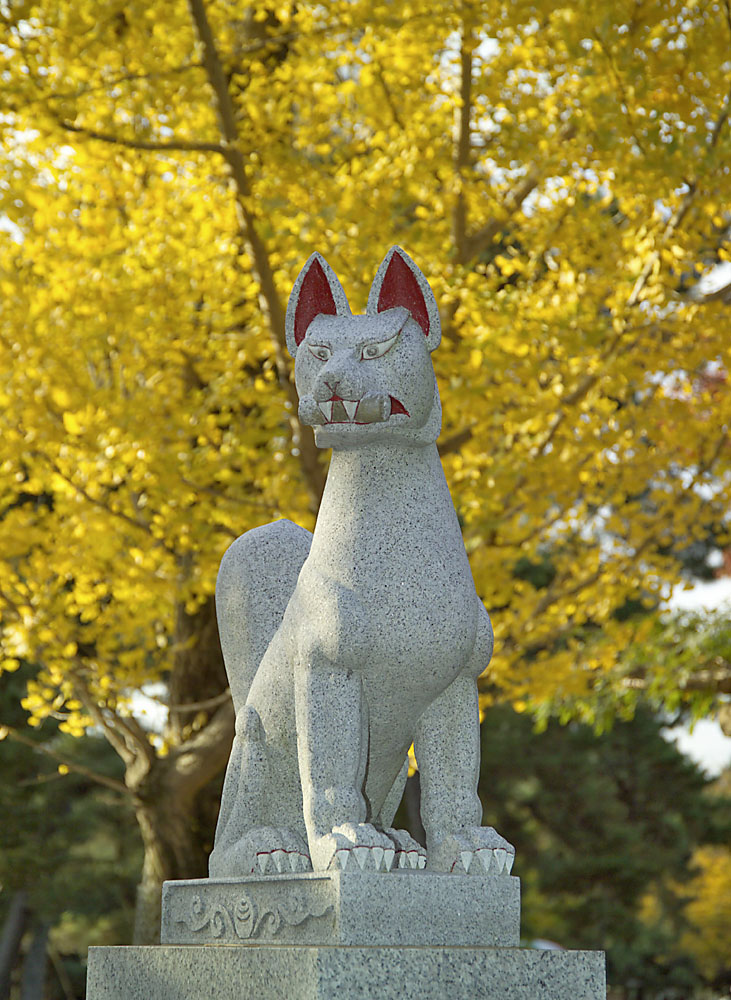
The fox was considered to be the messenger of Ta-no-Kami.

In many parts of Japan, there are Kitsune tsuka (small fox shrine); the fox was considered to be a messenger of Ta-no-Kami. Inari Shrines originated from Kitsune tsuka, and faith in Inari Shrines spread throughout Japan.

== Ta-no-Kami of Kagoshima and Miyazaki Prefectures ==
In almost all areas of Japan, the real picture of Ta-no-Kami remains unclear, with the single exception of Tanokansaa in Kagoshima Prefecture and parts of Miyazaki Prefecture. Tanokansaa is the dialect of Ta-no-Kami in these prefectures. In their communities, peasants place Tanokansaa stone statues, either of the buddha type and shinto priest type (with or without a mace), or of the peasant type (with or without a pestle). It was started in the 18th century in the Satsuma han. In Miyazaki Prefecture, Ta-no-Kami is seen only in areas governed by Satsuma han. After the meiji era, this custom spread in accordance with the movements of its inhabitants.

== Folklore ==
Saotome (早乙女), or rice planting women, played a religious role in ancient times, rice growing was considered a religious act, and there were many taboos that had to be observed. The inadama was the spirit of the rice plant. Since World War 2 rice planting has become mechanized.

== See also ==
- Polytheism
