= Chinjugami =

Japanese tutelary deity

Chinjugami (鎮守神; lit. guardian deity) is a kami that is worshipped in order to gain its protections for a specific building or region. In modern times, it is often conflated with ujigami and ubusunagami. A shrine enshrining a chinjugami is called a chinjusha.

Chinjugami differ from ujigami in that the latter is tied to bloodlines, while the former is to buildings and regions. Anyone living on the land worships them regardless of blood ties.

== Overview ==
A chinju no mori enshrining a chinjugami (Tamba-Sasayama)

Chinjugami are said to have their origin in the Sangharama of China. Protective kami began to be worshipped in Japanese Buddhist temples as well as Buddhism spread throughout Japan and shinbutsu-shūgō progressed. Later, such protective kami became worshipped in not only temples but other buildings as well and even set regions.

Modern belief often views chinjugami are jinushi-no-kami (地主神; lit. "landlord deity"), but chinjugami were originally kami new to that region who were worshiped so that they would oppose former occupant that was the jinushi-no-kami in order to make them complacent. In short, when people built manmade structures on a land, they would bring in and worship a more powerful kami than the local jinushi-no-kami so that no misfortune befell the people or buildings there. It was expected that the jinushi-no-kami would be subjugated by the chinjugami and come to serve it, supporting and protecting its activities, though there have been cases in which a jinushi-no-kami resisted and cursed the region.

However, as time passed, this original meaning of the chinjugami was forgotten and they became conflated with jinushi-no-kami. These chinjugami have come to be enshrined in temples, mansions, manors, and castles, and eventually even small settlements.

It is believed chinjugami worship began in small settlements where there was conflict between the people and the local gōzoku nobles. The chinjugami were enshrined in the settlement and meant to oppose the clan ujigami worshipped by the nobles.

== Chinju shrines ==
Shrines erected as adjuncts to Buddhist temples are called chinjusha (鎮守社; lit. "guardian shrine"). The opposite, a temple within a shrine, is called a jingū-ji (神宮寺). In addition, when it is a Buddhist temple functioning as the guardian of an establishment, it was called a chinju-ji (鎮守寺), chinju-dō (鎮守堂), or chinju-den (鎮守殿).

== Gallery ==
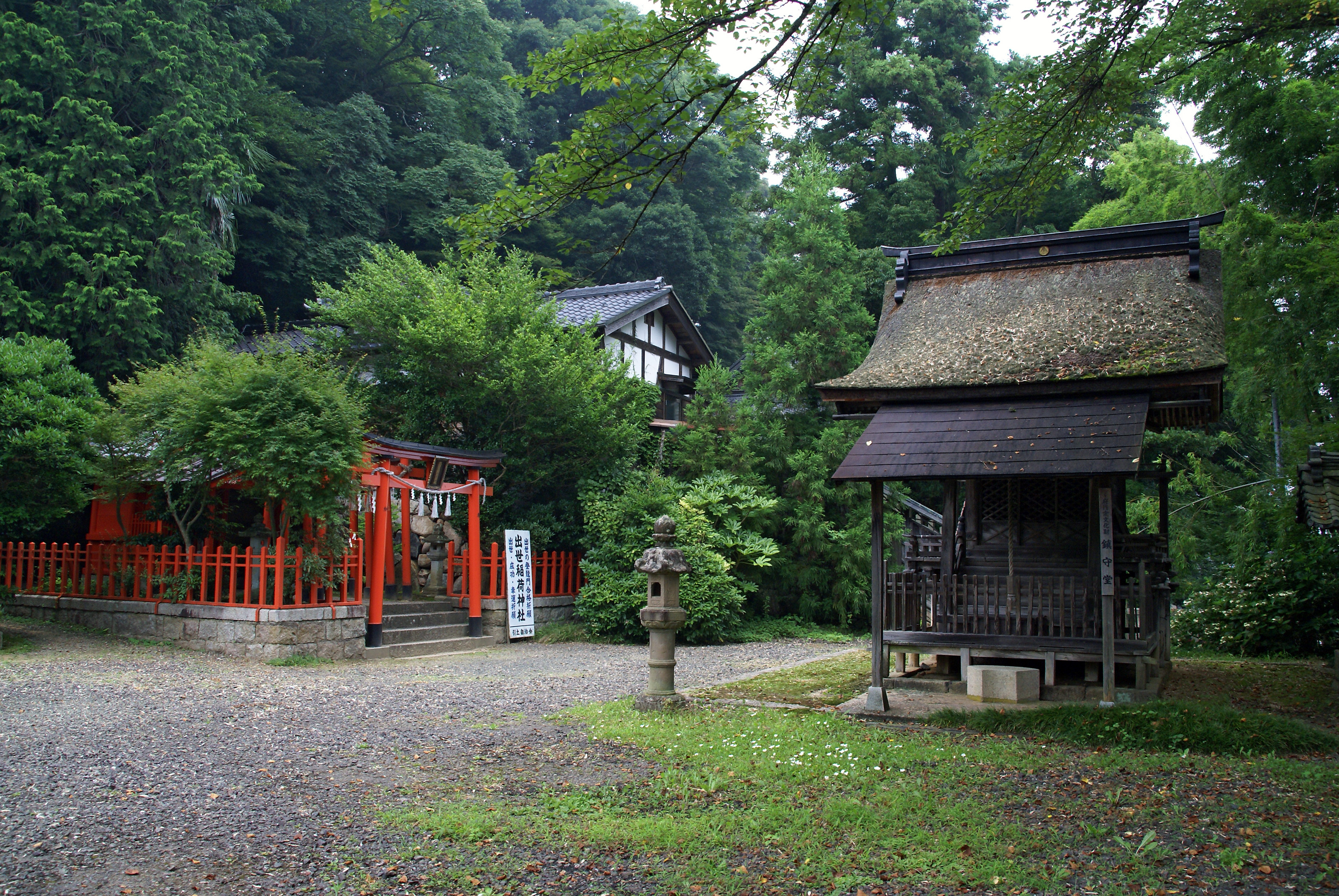
The chinju-ji and Inari shrine of Enrū-ji Temple (dedicated to Inari Ōkami)

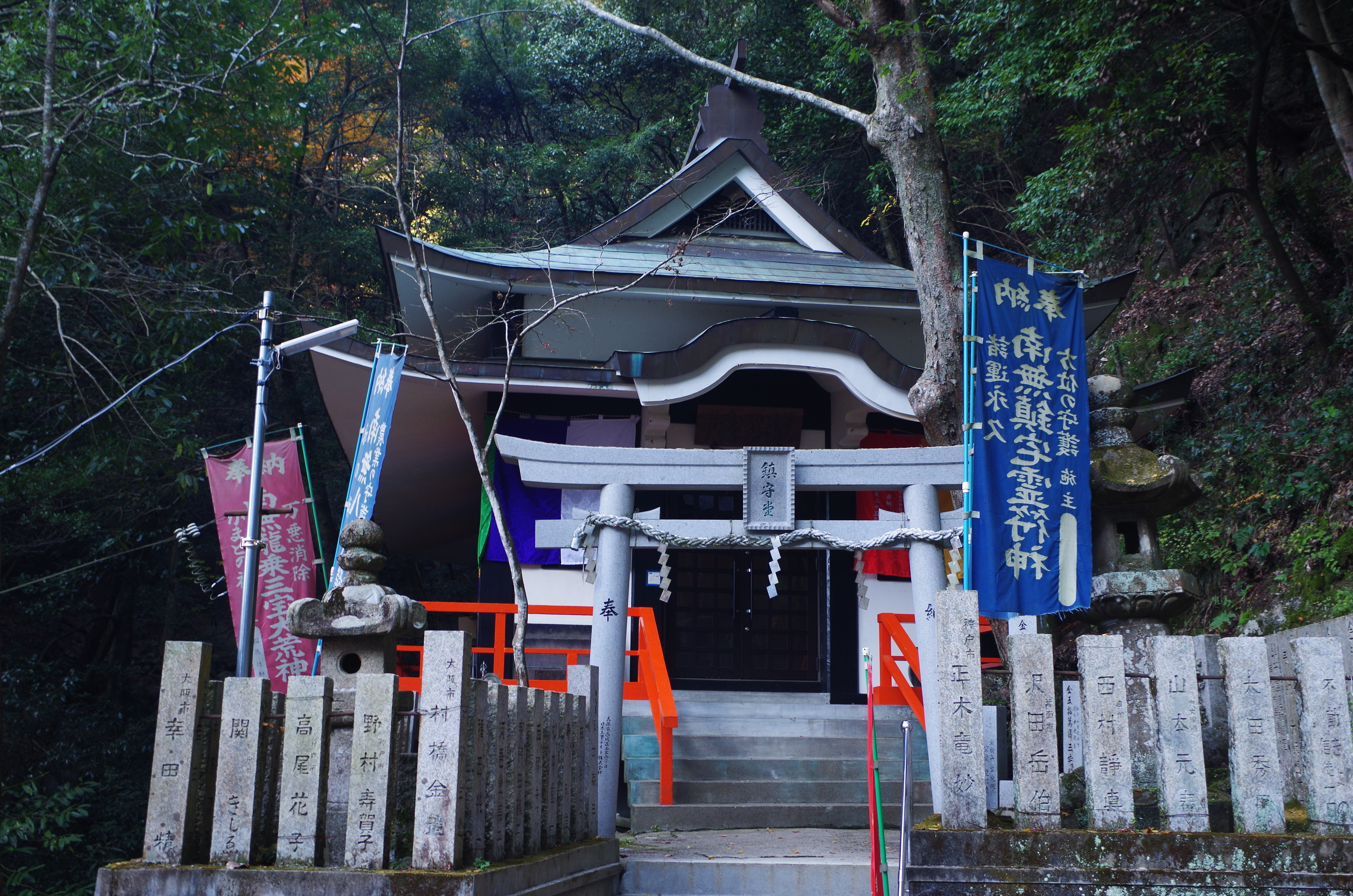
Chintaku Reifu-jin and Kōjin shrine（Shippōryū-ji Temple）

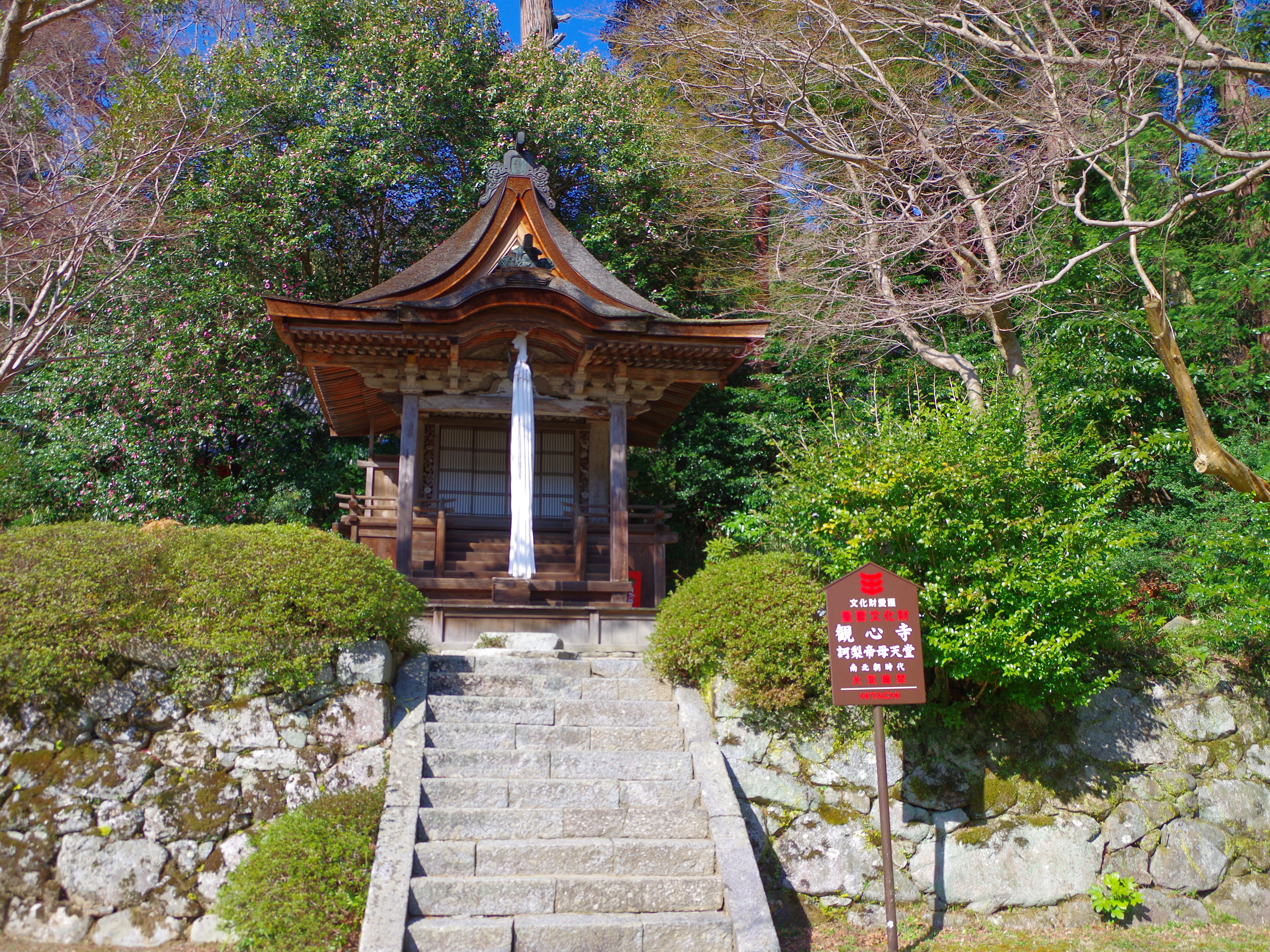
Kishimojin Hall (at Kanshin-ji）

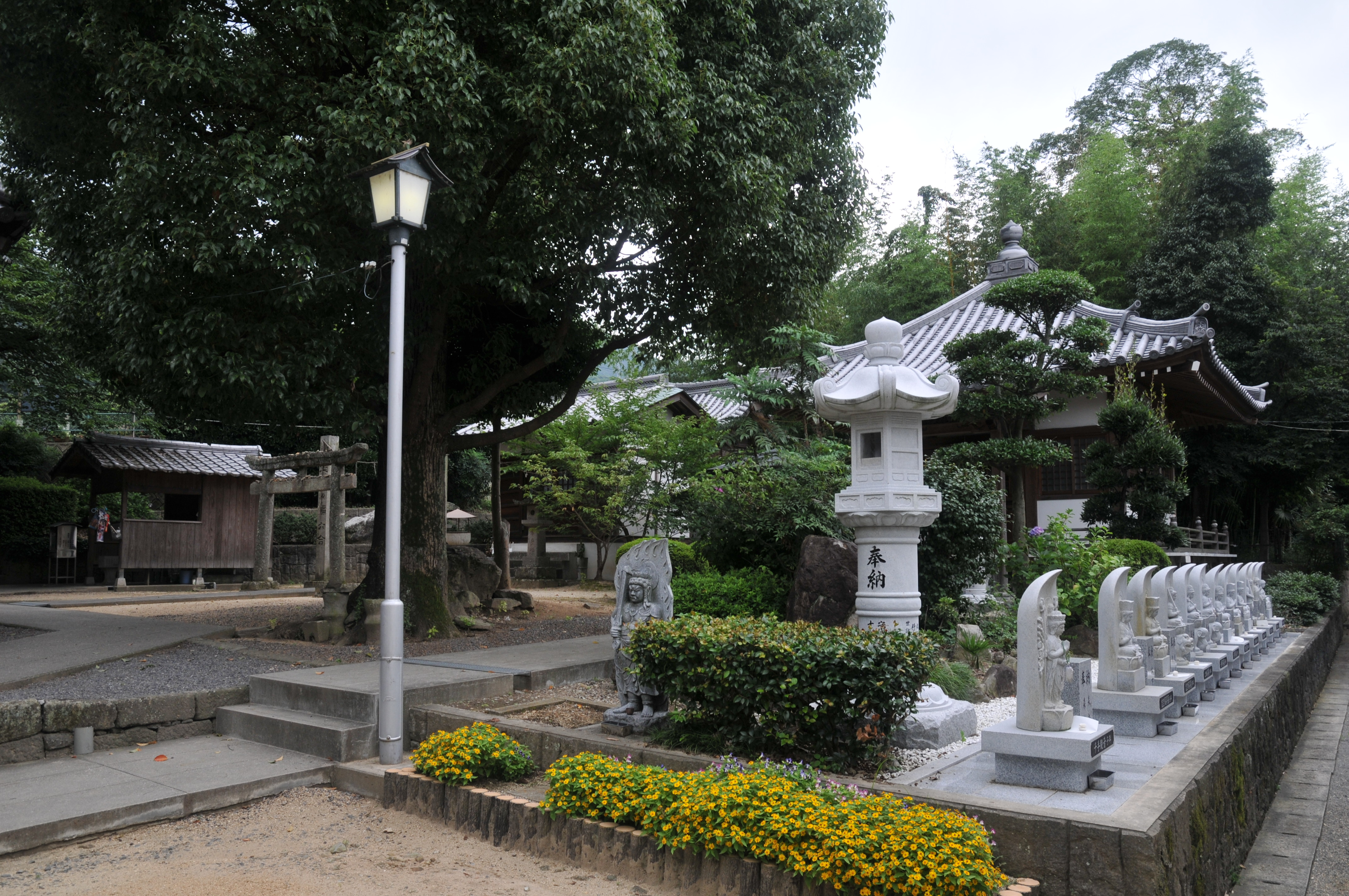
Chinju-dō, Butsu-dō, and Homa-dō of Mandara-ji Temple

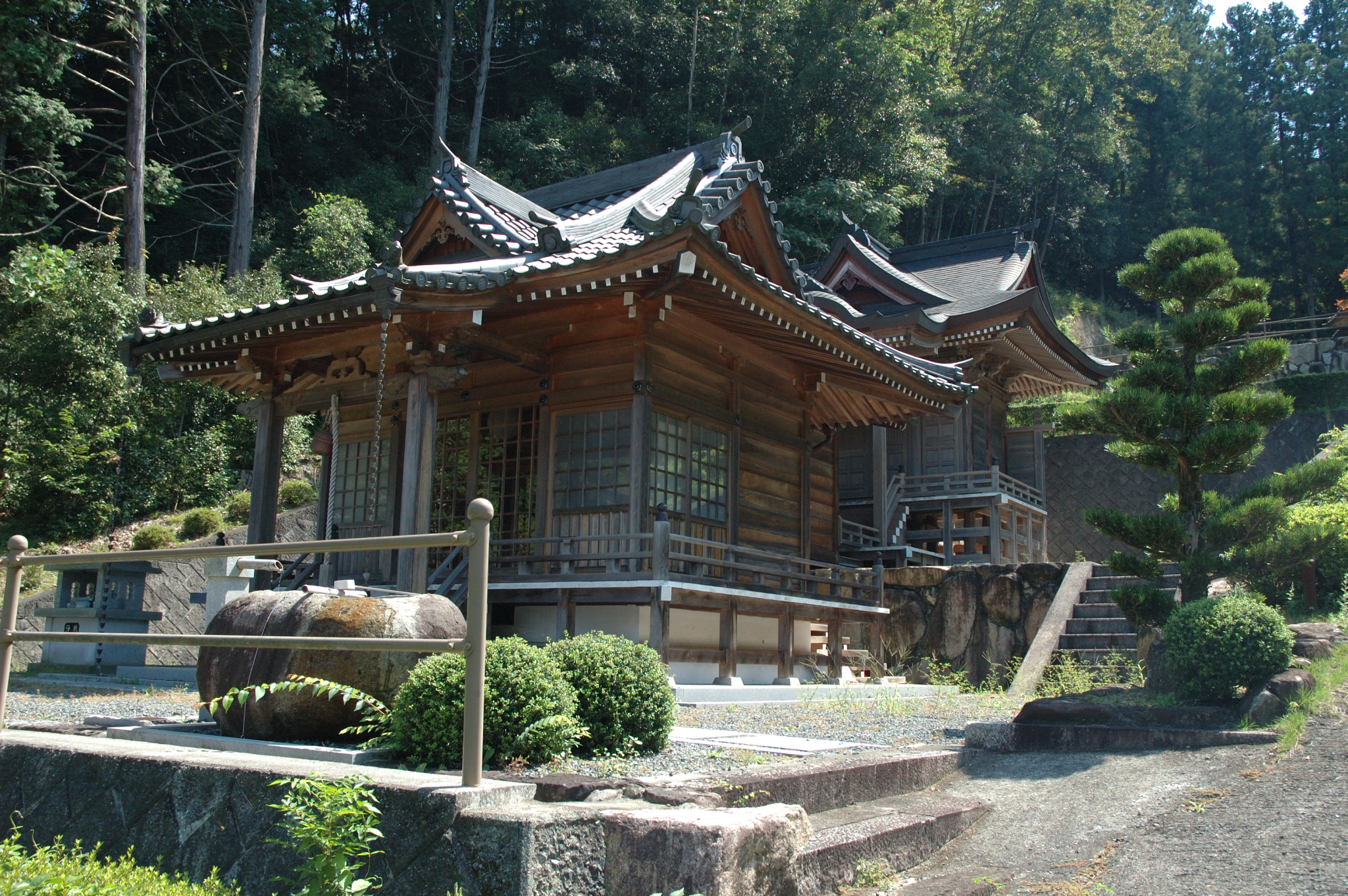
Sannō Gongen Hall (Chōhuku-ji Temple)

== See also ==
- Chinju no Mori
- Chinjusha
- Festival (Shōka (music)) – The jinchu-gami appears as the village deity at the center of the village festival.
- Glossary of Japanese Buddhism § tatchū
- Jinushigami
- List of Japanese deities
- Setsumatsusha
- Ubusunagami
- Ujigami
