= Hitachi Furyumono =

Japanese festival with puppets

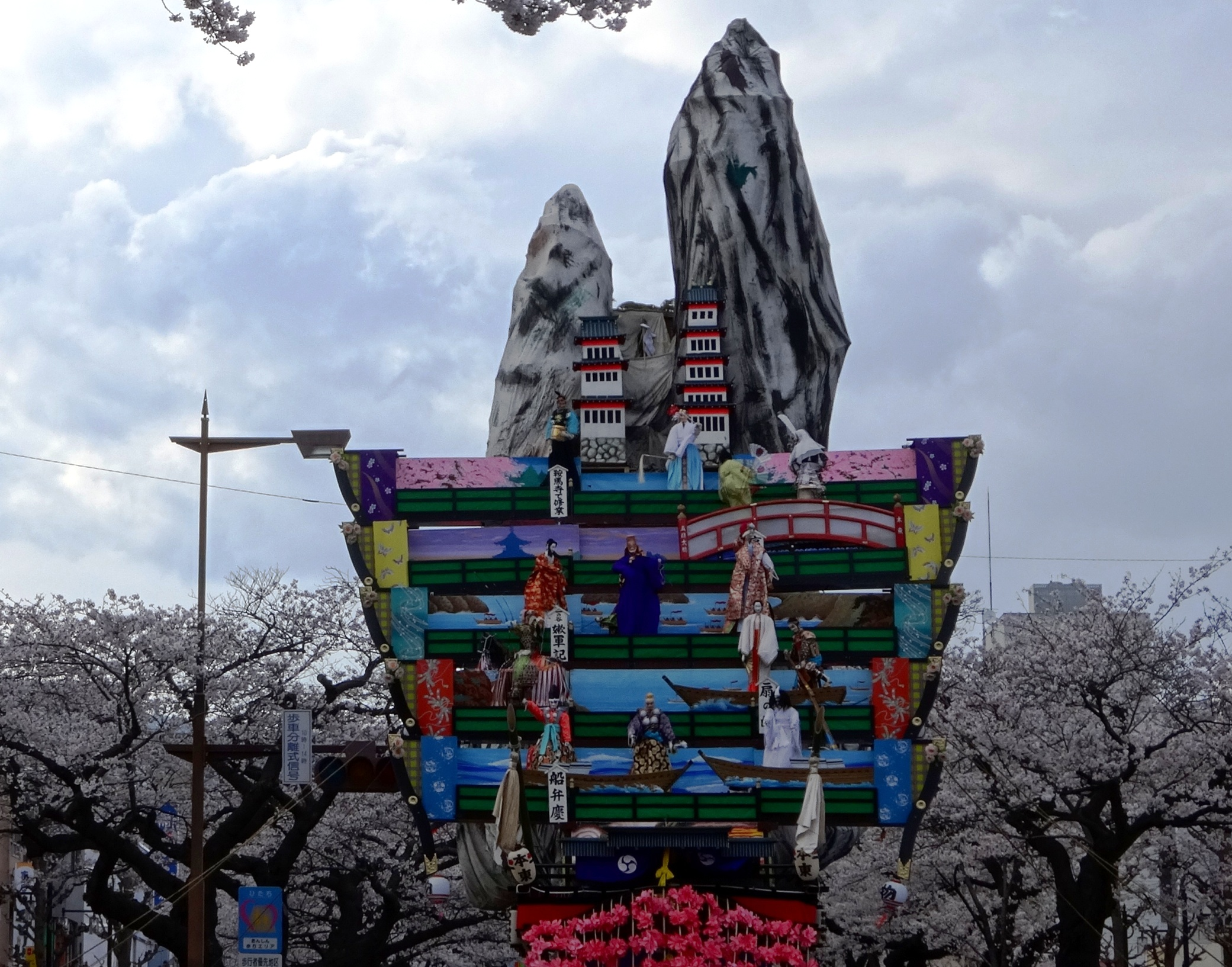
Omote-yama (表山), the festival float of Hitachi Furyumono

One of the mechanical puppets being manipulated

The Hitachi Furyumono (日立風流物) is a parade in Hitachi city, Japan. It is held during Hitachi Sakura Matsuri (日立さくらまつり), the annual cherry blossom festival in April, and the Great Festival at the local Kamine Shrine once in every seven years in May. It is inscribed on the UNESCO Intangible Cultural Heritage Lists as a part of "Yama, Hoko, Yatai, float festivals in Japan", 33 traditional Japan festivals.

== Parade ==
Furyumono is a puppet show performed onstage on the floats. Each of four local communities - Kita-machi (北町), Higashi-machi (東町), Nishi-machi (西町) and Moto-machi (元町) - has their own float. During the annual festival, one community presents its parade float each year. During the Great Festival at Kamine Shrine, the four communities compete for the most skilled puppeteers and the best hospitality to the local deity.

The floats are five tons in weight, 15 meters in height, and from 3 to 8 meters in width. Each of them has a five-storied stage, and on each stage puppets play a scene of one story respectively.

Each puppet is controlled by three to five puppeteers manipulating the ropes.

== History ==
The origin of the parade goes back to 1695. According to Kamine Shrine, Tokugawa Mitsukuni, the second lord of Mito Domain, appointed Kamine Shrine as the Sou-Chinju, the local tutelary shrine. People held religious festivals and dedicated floats to the shrine.

In the early 18th century, a puppet show began supposedly imitating Ningyō jōruri, the puppet theater with chanted narration that was very popular in Edo and Osaka area at that time.

In 1945, most of the floats were lost in the war disasters, but Furyumono was restored in 1958. In addition, the existing float was registered as the Important Tangible Folk Cultural Property in 1959.

In 1977, Furyumono was registered as the Important Intangible Folk Cultural Property.

In 2009, it was inscribed on the UNESCO Intangible Cultural Heritage Lists with the Yamahoko parade of Gion Matsuri. In 2016, these two parades and 31 traditional festivals were registered on the UNESCO Intangible Cultural Heritage Lists as "Yama, Hoko, Yatai, float festivals in Japan", the representative examples showing the diversity of Japan local cultures.
