= Ubusunagami =

In Shinto, guardian deity connected to the place of one's birth

Ubusunagami (産土神, lit. "Birth Deity/Divinity/Spirit") in Shinto are tutelary kami of one's birthplace.

== Overview ==
Ubusunagami are a type of a guardian deity connected to the place of one's birth. It is believed this kami protects you from before you are born until after you die, and it will continue to do so throughout your life even if you move to another location.

While there are similarities between ubusunagami and ujigami, the relationship between ujigami and their follower (氏子, ujiko) is based on bloodlines, the relationship between an ubusunagami and their follower (産子, ubuko) is based on a faith linked to geographical location. This is why the concept of an ubusunagami is prominent in cities. For example, clan unity in Kyoto weakened in the Middle Ages and a sense of community based on location grew in its place, leading to the development of the concept of ubuko regions based on ubusunagami that featured influential shrines such as Fushimi Inari-taisha, Kamigoryō Shrine, the Kamo Shrines, and Kitano Tenmangū. The term ubusunamōde (産土詣; to visit one's ubusunagami) became widespride along with the practice of visiting an ubusunagami for things such as a child's miyamairi, coming-of-age ceremony, Shichi-Go-San visits, and more. In Edo as well, Ōyamakui-no-kami was regarded the ubusunagami of the Tokugawa clan, and their festivals were particularly grand.

Ubusunagami are distinct from chinjugami because one maintains the link to their ubusunagami throughout their entire life, even if they move to a new location.

Nonetheless ubusunagami, ujigami, and chinjugami are often conflated in the modern day, and all three are seen as strengthening local identity.

In some locations, the ubusunagami is linked to the ubugami, a tutelary deity of infants and pregnant women; in these cases, it is customary to pay respects immediately following childbirth at a hokora to the deity.

Since the Muromachi period, the belief in the ujigami as a family deity is declining nationwide and is being absorbed by the newly emerged belief in the ubusunagami and chinjugami.

== In popular culture ==
Ubusunagami are prominent in Jujutsu Kaisen.

== See also ==
- Chinjugami
- Ujigami
- Di Penates

== Bibliography ==
- 日本史用語研究会 (2 February 2009) [2009-2-2]. 必携日本史用語 (四訂版 ed.). 実教出版. ISBN 9784407316599.
