= Chinjusha =

Shinto shrine which enshrines a tutelary kami

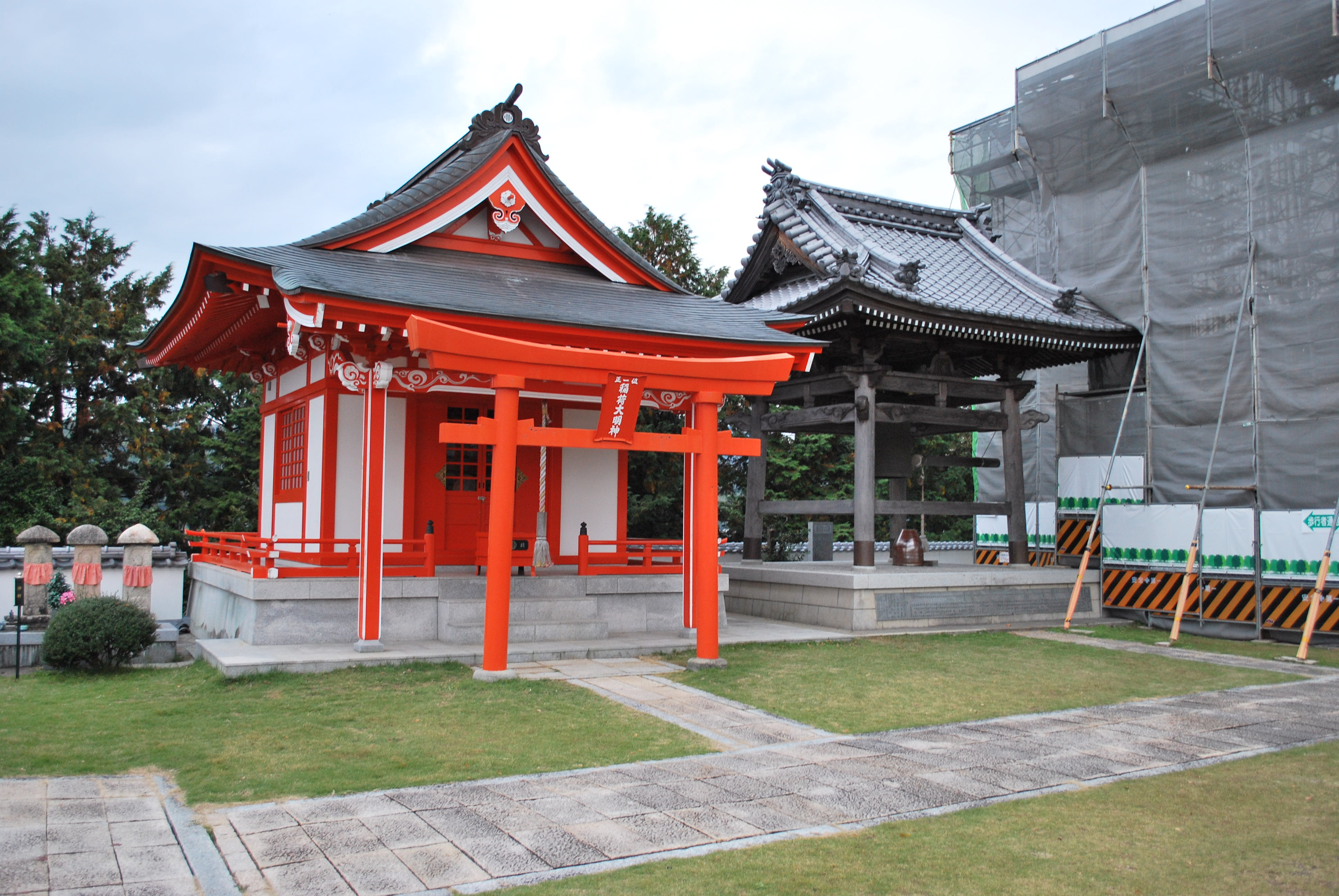
a typical Chinjusha seen on a temple complex

In Japan, a chinjusha (鎮守社•鎮社; or tutelary shrine) is a Shinto shrine which enshrines a tutelary kami (鎮守神, chinjugami); that is, a patron spirit that protects a given area, village, building or a Buddhist temple. The Imperial Palace has its own tutelary shrine dedicated to the 21 guardian gods of Ise Shrine. Tutelary shrines are usually very small, but there is a range in size, and the great Hiyoshi Taisha for example is Enryaku-ji's tutelary shrine. The tutelary shrine of a temple or the complex the two together form are sometimes called a temple-shrine (寺社, jisha). If a tutelary shrine is called chinju-dō, it is the tutelary shrine of a Buddhist temple. Even in that case, however, the shrine retains its distinctive architecture.

== Chinjugami ==
A chinjugami is the tutelary kami of a specific area or building, as for example a village or a Buddhist temple. The term today is a synonym of ujigami (clan's tutelary ancestor) and ubusuna (産土神, lit. native place kami); however, the three words had originally a different meaning. While the first refers to a clan's ancestor and the second to the tutelary kami of one's birthplace, chinjugami is the tutelary kami of a given place, highly respected and venerated. The concepts were however sufficiently close to fuse together with the passing of time.

== History ==
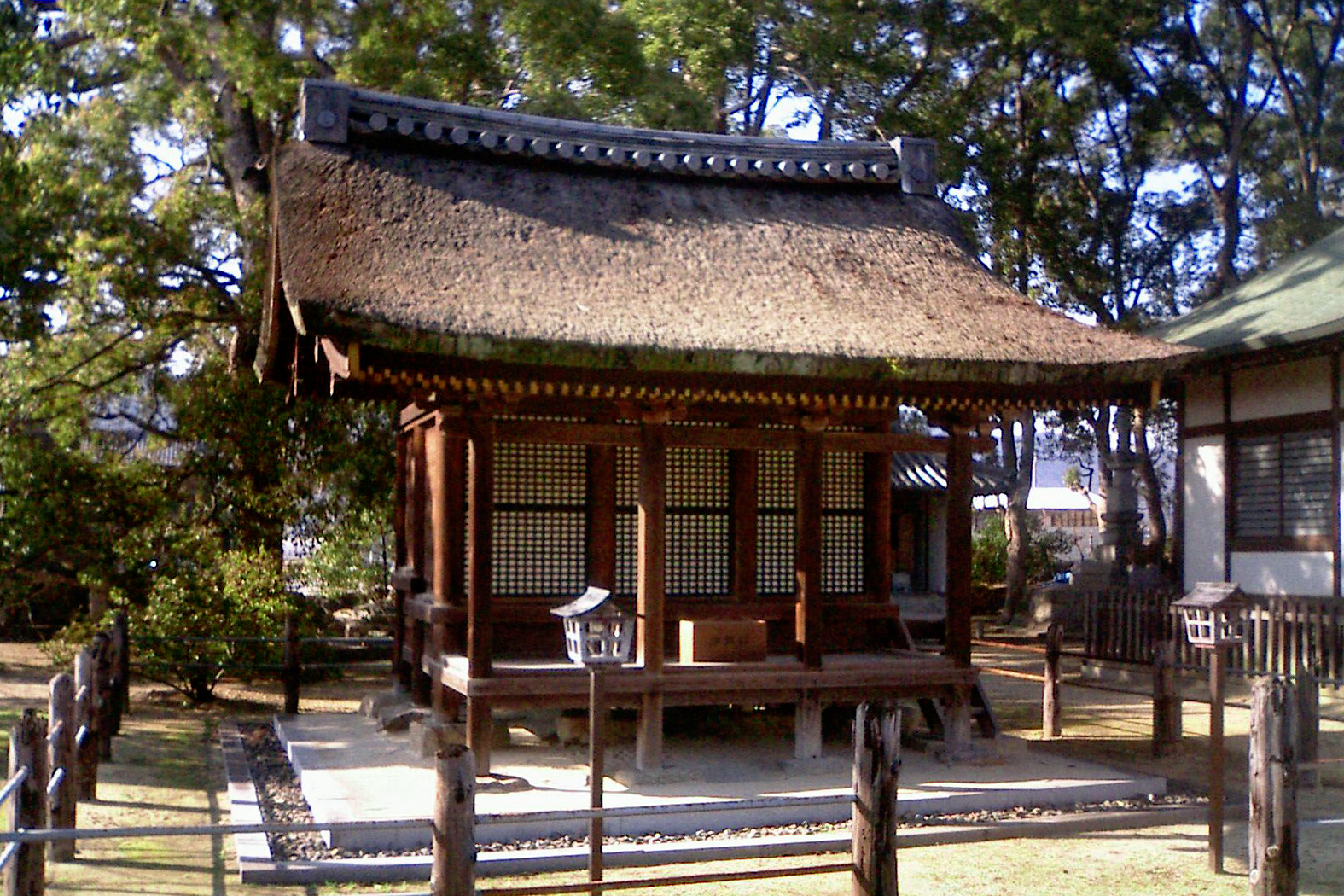
Motoyama-ji's chinjū-dō

The frequent presence, even today, of a Shinto shrine near or in a Buddhist temple has its roots in the efforts made by the Japanese to reconcile local kami worship with imported Buddhism. (For details, see article Shinbutsu shūgō.)

One of the first such efforts was made during the Nara period (710–794) with the founding of so-called shrine-temples (jingū-ji), complexes consisting of a shrine dedicated to some kami and of a Buddhist temple. This syncretic solution is believed to have its roots in the Chinese qié-lán-shen (garanjin (伽藍神, lit. kami of the garan) in Japanese), tutelary gods of Chinese temples.

The reason for Buddhist temples and Shinto shrines to be constructed together was the belief that kami, like humans, needed salvation through the power of Buddha. Kami were then thought to be subject to karma and reincarnation like human beings, and early Buddhist stories tell how the task of helping suffering kami was assumed by wandering monks. A local kami would appear in a dream to the monk, telling him about his suffering. To improve the kami's karma through Buddhist rites and the reading of sūtras, the monk would build a temple next to the kami's shrine. Such groupings were created already in the 7th century, for example in Usa, Kyūshū, where kami Hachiman was worshiped together with Miroku Bosatsu (Maitreya) at Usa Hachiman-gū. As a result of the creation of shrine-temple complexes, many shrines that had been open-air sites became Buddhist style groupings of buildings.

At the end of the same century, Hachiman was declared to be the Dharma's tutelary kami and, a little later, a bosatsu. Shrines for him started to be built at temples (the so-called temple-shrines, or jisha), marking an important step ahead in the process of amalgamation of kami worship and Buddhism. When the great Buddha at Tōdai-ji in Nara was built, within the temple grounds was also erected a shrine for Hachiman, according to the legend because of a wish expressed by the kami himself. After this, temples in the entire country adopted tutelary kami like Hachiman and built shrines for them.

This tendency to see kami as tutelary deities was strengthened during the Edo period (1603–1868) by the terauke system. Because all shrines were by law owned and managed by a Buddhist temple, many of their kami came to be viewed as the temple's tutelary kami.

As a result, until the Meiji period (1868–1912) the vast majority of all shrines were small, had no permanent priest and belonged to a Buddhist temple. With very few exceptions like Ise Shrine and Izumo Taisha, they were just part of a temple-shrine complex controlled by Buddhist clergy. Because they enshrined a local and minor tutelary kami, they were called with the name of the kami followed by terms like gongen (avatar), ubusuna, or myōjin (明神, great kami). The term jinja (神社), now the most common, was rare. Examples of this kind of pre-Meiji use are Tokusō Daigongen and Kanda Myōjin.

== Examples of tutelary shrines ==
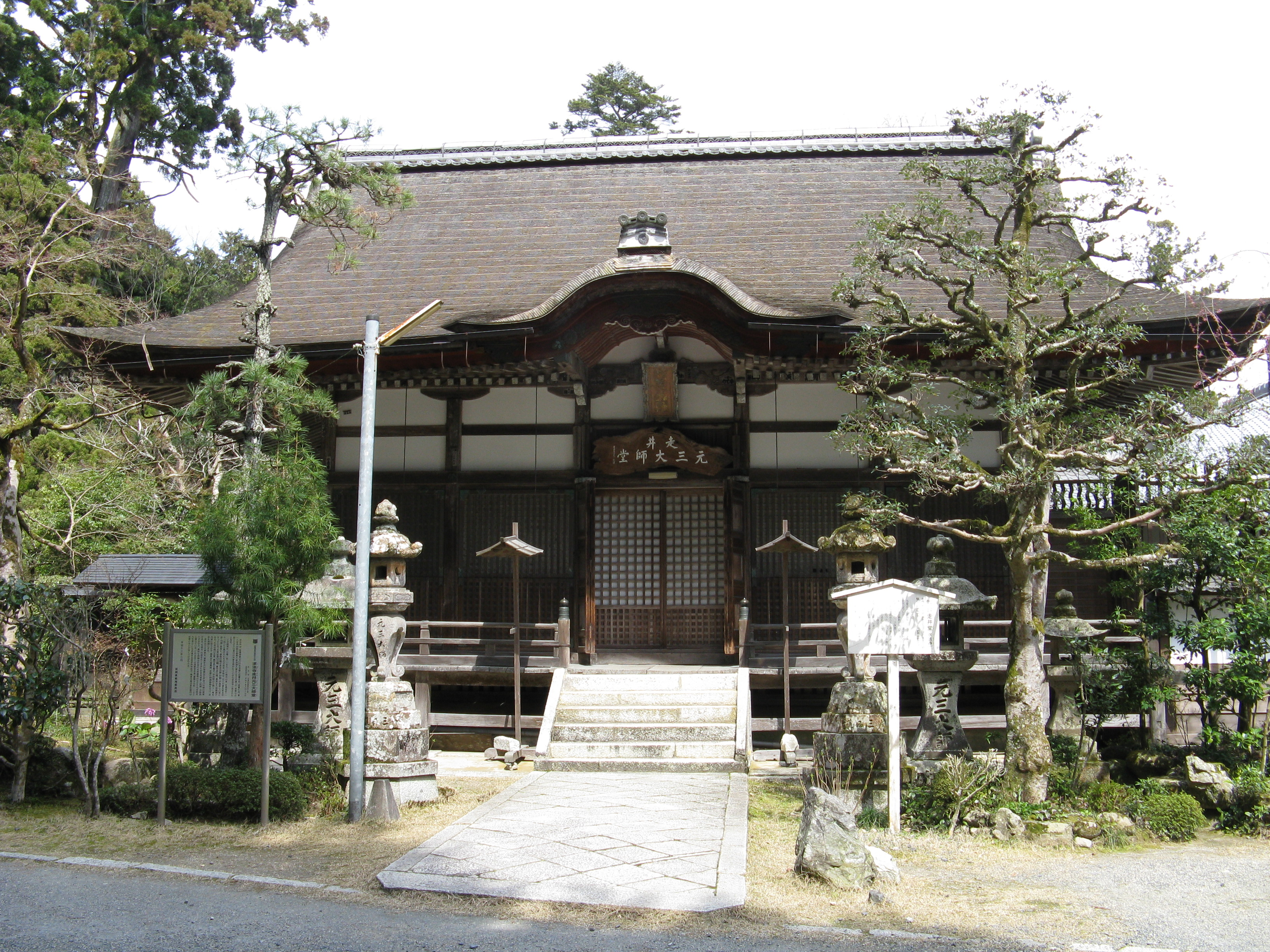
Hiyoshi Taisha is Enryaku-ji's tutelary shrine, one of the largest such shrines

- Hachiman played an important role in the evolution of temple-shrines, and is still the tutelary kami of many important temples, among them Tōdai-ji, Daian-ji, Yakushi-ji and Tō-ji.
- Akiha shrines practice a fire protection cult which originated at Akihasan Hongū Akiha Jinja in Shizuoka Prefecture. During the Edo period, the shrine was under the administration of neighboring Sōtō Zen temple Shūyō-ji, many affiliated Akiha shrines are the tutelary shrines of a Sōtō temple.
- During the Japanese Middle Ages, many estates belonging to Kōfuku-ji, and its tutelary shrine Kasuga Taisha were given the Kasuga kami as a tutelary kami, leading to the spread of such shrines to the whole country.
- The Kami Inari is often the tutelary kami of Buddhist temples.
- The great Hiyoshi Taisha, head of a network of more than 4000 shrines, is Enryaku-ji's chinjusha.

== See also ==
- Chinju no Mori
- Chinjugami
- Hokora
