= List of Tsugumomo episodes =

Tsugumomo is an anime series adapted from the manga, written by Yoshikazu Hamada. The series is directed and written by Ryōichi Kuraya at Zero-G. Yasuharu Takanashi composed the music at Pony Canyon. The first season aired from April 3 to June 19, 2017, on Animax, Tokyo MX and BS11. The series ran for 12 episodes. Crunchyroll licensed the first season and streamed it in North America, Latin America, Australia, New Zealand, South Africa, Europe, the Middle East, and North Africa. While Funimation dubbed it and released it on home video in North America.

A second season titled Tsugu Tsugumomo, aired from April 5 to June 21, 2020. The opening theme is When the Wind Blows, It Reaches the End of the Moonlit Night (風吹けば月夜の果てに, "Kaze Fukeba Tsukiyo no Hate ni") performed by AŌP, while the ending theme is Play in Spring (春、奏で, "Haru, Kanade"). An 20-minute original video animation was also produced through crowdfunding. It was bundled with the manga's 24th volume, which was released on January 22, 2020.

== Episode list ==
=== Tsugumomo (Season 1) ===
No.	Title (Note: All English titles are taken from Crunchyroll.)	Original air date (Note: Tokyo MX lists episodes premiering on Sunday at 24:30, which is technically Monday at 12:30 a.m. JST. Therefore, the dates for Japanese broadcast reflect the actual calendar date.)
1	"The Scent of Cherry Blossoms"; Transliteration: "Sakura no Kaori" (Japanese: 桜の香り)	April 3, 2017
Kazuya Kagami wakes up in class from a bad dream to discover that he is inadvertently groping classmate Chisato Chikaishi's breasts. After escaping her wrath, Kazuya goes to the roof where he takes comfort in his late mother's obi. Kazuya is attacked by a possessed wig and falls off the building, but is saved by his obi. From within the obi, a young girl, a tsukumogami, emerges. They are met by the host of the wig. The tsukumogami asks the host to sever their link with the wig, which the tsukumogami calls an amasogi. However, the host and wig attack and the tsukumogami is forced to destroy the wig before disappearing. At home, Kazuya reflects on the day's events before falling asleep. After another nightmare, he wakes to find the tsukumogami in his bed. After avoiding a confrontation with Kazuya's possessive sister Kasumi, the tsukumogami introduces herself as Kiriha and that she the tsukumogami of Kazuya's obi and that Kazuya is now her servant.
2	"The Library and the Childhood Friend"; Transliteration: "Toshoshitsu to Osananajimi" (Japanese: 図書室と幼馴染)	April 10, 2017
Living with Kiriha is hard enough, but Kazuya also takes abuse from Chisato at school. Having forgotten to complete his homework, Chisato drags Kazuya to the library to finish it. While in the library, Chisato bashfully offers Kazuya to come to his house to help him study, but he turns her down. After Kazuya finishes, he encounters Kiriha while Chisato discovers that they are trapped in the library. During the attempt to break free, the library transforms into an alternate space and the books attack Kiriha. Kiriha realizes that Chisato is the host of the amasogi and tells Kazuya to fulfill Chisato's desire. Kazuya asks Chisato if she would come to his house to tutor him and the library returns to normal. At Kazuya's house, Chisato apologizes, however, Kiriha explains that it was not Chisato's fault, but that the amasogi was created due to a substance called malison and that such a high concentration was the fault of the local deity, Kukuri.
3	"Kukuri-hime"; Transliteration: "Kukuri-hime" (Japanese: くくりひめ)	April 17, 2017
Shiro is approached by Kokuyu who mistakes him to be Kazuya. Hoping to be able to grope her boobs, he treats her for lunch at a nearby family restaurant, but he gets more than he bargained for when Kokuyu orders everything on the menu, leaving him with a huge tab. The next day when Kazuya meets up with Osamu, he gets a flying kick from Shiro who is apparently disappointed and green with envy as to what happened yesterday. Moments later, before recess, all of the students' lunches go missing, then Kokuyu appears eating all of the lunches. She orders Kazuya to come with her, but Kiriha intervenes. After a brief confrontation Kiriha, Kazuya and Chisato accompany Kokuyu to a local shrine, where another confrontation is waiting for Kiriha and Kazuya with Kukuri.
4	"Trials of the Local God"; Transliteration: "Tochigami no Shiren" (Japanese: 土地神の試練)	April 24, 2017
As the fight between Kiriha and Kukuri continues, Kiriha uses up more and more power reducing her to a chibi form. With Kiriha close to defeat, Kazuya has a vision and uses her true name to force her into obi form and wields her as a weapon against Kukuri. He almost defeats her, but finally has to accept the duty of malison cleaner as Kukuri gets hold of Kiriha and threatens to kill her. Suddenly the string that holds her Noh Mask snaps off, also reducing her into a chibi form. Kiriha, in a state of rage, suddenly roughs up on her by forcefully stripping her half naked making Kukuri scream in agony. Kazuya, Chisato and Kiriha leave the devastated shrine, and Kazuya and Kiriha talk while taking a bath.
5	"Training"; Transliteration: "Tokkun" (Japanese: 特訓)	May 1, 2017
Kazuya is unable to reenact his fighting skills with the obi and is forced to undergo Kiriha's spartan training that proves to be too much for him. While in the bath Kiriha explains to Kazuya the finer details about tsugumomo like herself. Meanwhile, Kukuri and Kokuyu do not have money to get the shrine fixed, which eventually collapses during a storm. They have to move their quarters to the park, and are getting ridiculed by Kiriha who happens to pass by. The next day Kazuya is summoned by Tadataka, the school's student council president (who was the host of the amasogi they encountered in episode 1), who asks him and Kiriha to investigate a series of mysterious amasogi manifestations that occur with the Tabletop RPG Association, with lone member Nakajima the culprit. As they go through the hallway to confront Nakajima they are joined by Osamu. Nakajima orders a Minotaur, he created by drawing it on an amasogi note pad, to attack them intending to force Tadataka to sanction the RPG Association as an official club. Unable to battle the Minotaur Kazuya, Kiriha and the rest can only retreat and manage to outsmart Nakajima, but he does not give up until his final attempt fails when Osamu switches his amasogi note pad with his. After the encounter the group decides to dispose of the amasogi note pad but before it can be done Osamu uses it to draw an adult version of Kiriha in her underwear, where Kazuya hoped it would be nicer than Kiriha, but gets a nasty beating from her.
6	"Memories and Childhood Friends"; Transliteration: "Omoide to Osananajimi" (Japanese: 思い出と幼馴染)	May 8, 2017
A student confesses to Chisato and she rejects him. Hosting an amasogi he turns the school into a dating sim gal game forcing Kazuya to compete with him in the game for Chisato's affection. However, not everything goes as planned and Chisato hates Kazuya even more. Kazuya asks Osanai to help him win Chisato's affection and Osanai reveals that there is a glitch that can help Kazuya win the game. Hiroshi is about to ask Chisato out under the cherry tree, but Kazuya interrupts him before he finishes. Chisato ask Kazuya what he wants, Kazuya takes two dolls out of his bagpack and tells her that he found them after looking for them, then he tells her he wants to playhouse with her. Chisato's affection is raised to the maximum and she remembers the time she used to playhouse with Kazuya in kindergarten. Kazuya and Chisato go to nurse office and decide to rest. Meanwhile, Kiriha and Osanai ask Hiroshi where the amasogi is and he tells them it is a CD in the computer lab. Osanai asks, surprised, what version of the game it is. It turns out to be the game's x-rated version. In the nurse office, Kazuya wakes up tied to the bed. Osanai and Hiroshi rushed to the computer lab and managed to destroy the amasogi, Kiriha rushed to the nurse office and was surprised by what she saw.
7	"Kanayama-san"; Transliteration: "Kanayama-san" (Japanese: 金山さん)	May 15, 2017
After encountering a big malison manifestation from school, Kiriha in her usual temper fit confronted Kukuri in a series of torturous wrestling locks where she expresses her anger over the latter's misinformation about the level of malison that Kazuya should encounter, thought Kokuyo is around she is unable to provide support since she has to report for work in order to pay off repairs and other debts that their shrine owes. The torture only stopped when Kazuya promises to buy Kiriha some pudding. While waiting for Kazuya, Kiriha and Kukuri had a little friendly chat while building a sand dam, until a duo of rowdy boys ruin it, that cause Kiriha to go after them until Kazuya arrives and took both of the home to bathe, while in the bath the two girls continued their little spat that lasted until both passed out from heat exhaustion, after which Kukuri went home to the park, while Kazuya and Kiriha settled down for dinner. After dinner Kazuya plans to take some of his large portion leftover for Kiriha, only to learned that her existence was already known on the day she takes on a human form, more so as Kazuya's father who knew her ever since he was courting his mother way back in high school (whom is Kiriha's master during that time) where she always give him a rough time. Kazuya has decided to bring some pudding to Kukuri only to find their temporary shire demolished, after some parent complaint to the city official about being a safety hazard to children, Kiriha took pity by letting them stay at Kazuya's house where at first it was met with opposition from Kazuya's sister and Father but later on allowed them when Kiriha blackmails Kazuya's father about the embarrassing love letter he was writing to Kazuya's mother when they were teenagers at that time. On the next day Kiriha together with Kukuri and Kazuya went to the Kanara Shrine in order to borrow money from Taguri in order to purchase some malison forecast, but on a condition that they have to play her version of cards where every wrong move has a corresponding consequence were much to Kiriha and Kukuri's chagrin have to endure the entire game with a series of perverted acts by Taguri, with the exemption of Kazuya since the game can only be played by the girls. The game ends were they garner about 175,000 yen.
8	"A Certain Day in the Kagami Household"; Transliteration: "Aru Hi no Kagami-ke" (Japanese: ある日の加賀見家)	May 22, 2017
8	"The Super Popular Fragrance"; Transliteration: "Motemote fureguransu" (Japanese: モテモテフレグランス)	May 22, 2017
Two stories within one episode. The first follows the exploits of the Kagami household on an average day with no malison cleansing. Kazuya goes shopping with Kiriha and Kukuri, getting them Pudding and Mizu Yokan for their desserts that night.
9	"Letter"; Transliteration: "Tegami" (Japanese: 手紙)	May 29, 2017
The episode starts with Kazuya and Kiriha doing a mock battle with Kukuri, unable to act fast enough has given Kukuri an upper hand thus losing to her which infuriates Kiriha, as punishment she had Kazuya do a hundred practice weave much to his chagrin. Next day in school, Kazuya together with Chisato and Osamu were summoned by Tadataka (who suffered from baldness due to his Malison Atonement) to look into a string of a haunting attacks that involves a decease student named Nago Eiko who died two years ago from an apparent suicide. During their investigation they encountered Nanakai Nanako who is a member of the school's newspaper club who is also investigating the same case. They had a brief encounter with Nago Eiko after she tries to attack Kosakabe in the changing room. After the brief encounter, Kosakabe has told them about Nago Eiko's history with the Nishina Yuuichi fan club as to how things had turned sour between her and with the group. They later on learned that Nanakai Nanako is Nago Eiko's sister and fearing that Murasaki (one of the members of Eiko's club) would be next to be attacked, both Kazuya and Kiriha sprung in to action in order to save Murasaki from Nanako were they also learn that Eiko is a Kamioni in a lock of hair that Nanako has been using to find out the truth behind Eiko's suicide. It was also revealed that Murasaki had hid the letter after Eiko had committed suicide fearing that it may contain information that would put the blame on the group. However, as she gives the letter to Nanako, she later finds out that Eiko was infected by an amasogi growth in her chest and she killed herself in order to protect Nanako from the amasogi's influence. After Nanako had finished reading the letter and finding out the truth, both Kazuya and Kiriha have to face the Kamioni which they had a lot of difficulty but they did destroy it. In the last few moments of the episode, Sunao Sumeragi, a malison cleanser, has appeared while Kiriha is pounding Kazuya in anger when Kazuya refuses to retreated after battling the Kamioni.
10	"Nude in the Futon"; Transliteration: "Hadaka futon" (Japanese: はだかふとん)	June 5, 2017
Kazuya and Kiriha are challenged and attacked at school by Sunao Sumeragi, who holds a vendetta against Kazuya's mother, and her katana Kotetsu. Later Kiriha tries to comfort Kazuya when he refuses to get up from the futon, when she suddenly turns back to her normal grown form. They are caught in an embarrassing position when Kasumi and Kukuri enter the room.
11	"Duel"; Transliteration: "Kettō" (Japanese: 決闘)	June 12, 2017
Kazuya has a dream where he talks about his relationship with Kiriha to his mother, Kanaka. The next day he has a duel with Sunao, organized by Kukuri, to determine who will be Kamioka's Malison-cleanser.
12	"Partner"; Transliteration: "Pātonā" (Japanese: パートナー)	June 19, 2017
During the duel with Sunao and Kotetsu, Kiriha and Kazuya enter a state of Divine-Possession, greatly increasing their power. Afterwards at home, Kukuri takes care of an exhausted Kazuya and Kiriha manipulates her into bathing him. Sunao's mother states that she cannot become the head of the Sumeragi family, unless she marries the man who defeated her. Kiriha joins the school, where Kazuya goes, under the name 'Obina Kiriha'.

=== Tsugu Tsugumomo (Season 2) ===
No. overall	No. in season	Title (Note: All English titles are taken from Crunchyroll.)	Original air date
13	1	"The Troubleshooters' Office"; Transliteration: "Onayami sōdanshitsu" (Japanese: お悩み相談室)	April 5, 2020
Kazuya Kagami has a dream about a mysterious Amasogi. In order to deal with the Amasogi at school, Kazuya and Kiriha Obina make a club with class' 2-2 classmates (Shirou Shiramine, Osamu Osanai, and Chisato Chikaishi). They investigate the cause of girls' underwear gone missing at school. Another group of students is involved in activities with a Tsukumogami (spirit that has transformed after many years, obtaining a body and soul indistinguishable from a human's).
14	2	"The False Fianceé"; Transliteration: "Uso-kon" (Japanese: うそこん)	April 12, 2020
Kukuri worries that Kazuya's sealed memories are resurfacing, as Kiriha meets with Sunao Sumeragi who apologizes for her past behavior (see season 1 episode 10) and a shocking revelation about Kazuya's mother is made. In order to appease her mother, upset her daughter lost a swordfight, Sunao asks Kazuya to pretend they are romantically involved. Embarrassing situations predictably result of this...
15	3	"Shirou-kun's Big Day!"; Transliteration: "Osawagase Shirō-kun" (Japanese: お騒がせしろう君)	April 19, 2020
The unrepentantly flirtatious, and constantly rejected, Shirou Shiramine aims for popular track-team member Mana Manaka. However his love-letter ends up instead with Mitsuri Mizushima, who accepts his confession much to his despair, and he discovers that an Amasogi is involved in her improving running speed - but with a twist...
16	4	"Swapped!"; Transliteration: "Hanten!" (Japanese: はんてん!)	April 26, 2020
Kukuri becomes advisor teacher to the Troubleshooters-club, and they investigate 2nd year students with a sleeping sickness from which they cannot awake. With the help of a Dream-Pillow-Tsugumomo and their genders reversed, they enter homeroom-teacher Iriha Isuzus' vivid dream to counter the Amasogi responsible.
17	5	"Sunao and Kotetsu"; Transliteration: "Sunao to Kotetsu" (Japanese: すなおと虎鉄)	May 3, 2020
Sunao's Tsukumogami sword, Kotetsu, is not awakening after his hilt was repaired, as his spirit energy is too low. Sunao asks Kazuya and Kiriha to travel with her to the Cave of the Divine Navel to save Kotetsu. Sunao questions her relationship with Kotesu, tainted by her treating him like a mere tool and blaming him for her brother's death.
18	6	"The Lost Village"; Transliteration: "Mayoiga" (Japanese: 迷い家)	May 10, 2020
Story of the group of Tsukumogami posing as students. Arumi, a female crystal ball and Akito, a male pair of scissors, wander into Mayoiga, the lost village of Tsukumogami. Learning that a Malinson-shard is needed to save the village, they capture Azami, a black female obi. She guides Arumi, Akito, Yasuki, a male bow, and Mimane, a female mirror, to a god weakened enough to be killed in order to obtain the shard.
19	7	"Versus"; Transliteration: "Taisen" (Japanese: 対戦)	May 17, 2020
19	7	"The Romantic Quiz Board Game"; Transliteration: "Koi no Sugoro kuizu" (Japanese: 恋のすごろクイズ)	May 17, 2020
"Versus": Akito and Mimane (Tsukumogami scissors and mirror) run into Kazuya and Kiriha at the arcade, which angers black-obi Tsukumogami Azami. This causes an Amasogi that takes them inside 'Ironman Fist', a fighting videogame where the loser gets a 'penalty'. After using her powers, Mimane's true nature is revealed to Kazuya and Kiriha. "The Romantic Quiz Board Game": Akito, Arumi (Tsukumogami crystal ball), Kazuya, and Kiriha get caught by another Amasogi and are forced to play a couples' board game. However to advance they need to answer rather embarrassing questions. Although the Tsukumogami posing as students need to keep their distances from The Troubleshooters Office Club, Kiriha blackmails Akito into joining. Later the women at home find out which girl Kazuya loves the most.
20	8	"New Club Members"; Transliteration: "Shinnyū buin" (Japanese: 新入部員)	May 24, 2020
The seal on Kazuya's memories keeps weakening. The Tsukumogami posing as students plan to take Kukuri's goddess-shard. Black-obi Azami takes an interest in Kazuya. Scissors-Akito and mirror-Mimane join the Troubleshooters Office and are tasked with dealing with an Amasogi on school grounds. Later Mimane invites herself at Kazuya's, Kokuyou is attacked and badly hurt, and the household prepares for battle. After the end-credits, Arumi and Mimane caused a misunderstanding in the Lost Village of Mayoiga.
21	9	"Assassins"; Transliteration: "Shikaku" (Japanese: 刺客)	May 31, 2020
Akito and Mimane join Kazuya, Kiriha, and local goddess Taguri Kanayama in battle against Tsukumogami from Mayoiga Village intent on obtaining Kukuri's shard. Meanwhile she is attacked by a second group of Mayoigans betting on her weakened state to kill her. As Akito and Mimane return home, Arumi informs them of trouble in Mayoiga Village. A drunk Kukuri decides Kazuya needs a bath.
22	10	"Revolt"; Transliteration: "Sōran" (Japanese: 騒乱)	June 7, 2020
Taguri asks for help from Takamagahara, the place where all the gods of Japan meet. Sunao Sumeragi and her sword-tsukomogami Kotetsu come live at Kazuya's house. Akito and his team go to Mayoiga Village and are immediately attacked. They learn the Radical Tsukomogami are consuming Humans to increase their power. Sunao transfers to Kazuya's school, intent on making him stronger and get closer. Meanwhile at Mayoiga, all-out war is planned to obtain Kukuri's shard.
23	11	"Total War"; Transliteration: "Sōryoku-sen" (Japanese: 総力戦)	June 14, 2020
The Tsukumogami from Mayoiga Village arrive on a flying boat. During the confrontation with the Mayoigan Miurahi, who carries the shard from the goddess he killed, Kukuri uses her last resort to defeat him. To everyone's shock, Azami interferes and her true intentions are revealed, putting Kazuya in a very hard spot.
24	12	"Decision"; Transliteration: "Ketsui" (Japanese: 決意)	June 21, 2020
Kazuya's mother, Kanaka, brought to life with Miurahi's shard by black-obi Azami's two halves, proves to be a formidable opponent even to gods. After Kukuri and Kiriha are killed and all seems lost, Kazuya's sister Kasumi and her hourglass Tsugumomo Saori trap Kanaka in a time-frozen state. This gives Kazuya three years to train and get stronger.
