= Kasugayama =

Kasugayama may refer to:

- Kasugayama stable, defunct stable of sumo wrestlers
- Kasugayama Station, railway station in Jōetsu, Niigata, Japan
- Kasugayama Castle, Japanese castle that stood in what is now Jōetsu, Niigata
- Kasugayama Primeval Forest, primeval forest near the Kasuga Grand Shrine in Nara, Japan
