= Shinboku =

Sacred trees in Shinto beliefs

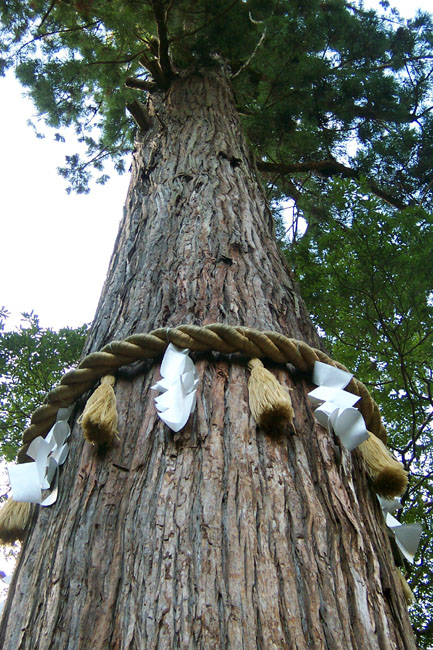
Shimenawa wrapped around the sacred tree: Yuki Shrine

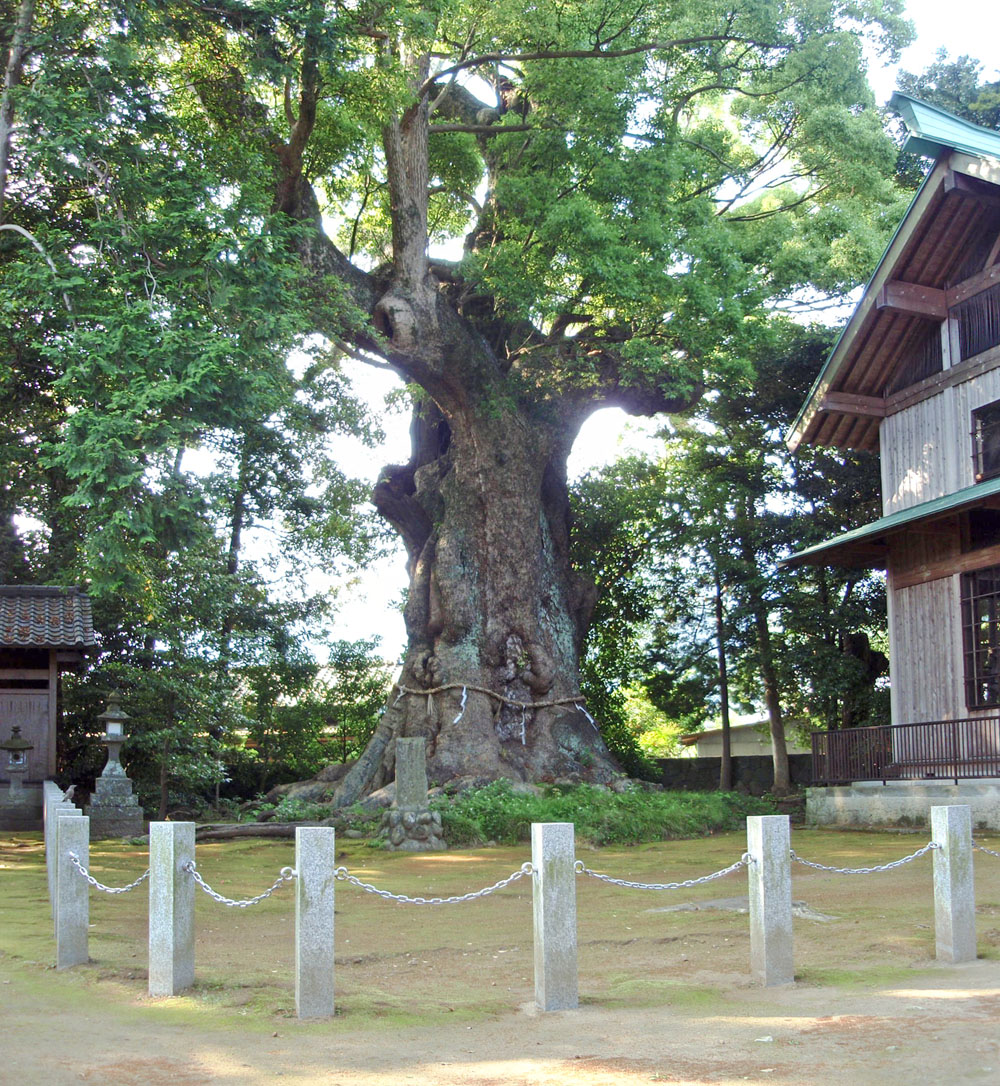
The sacred tree of Sugiwabemikoto Shrine, Natural monument

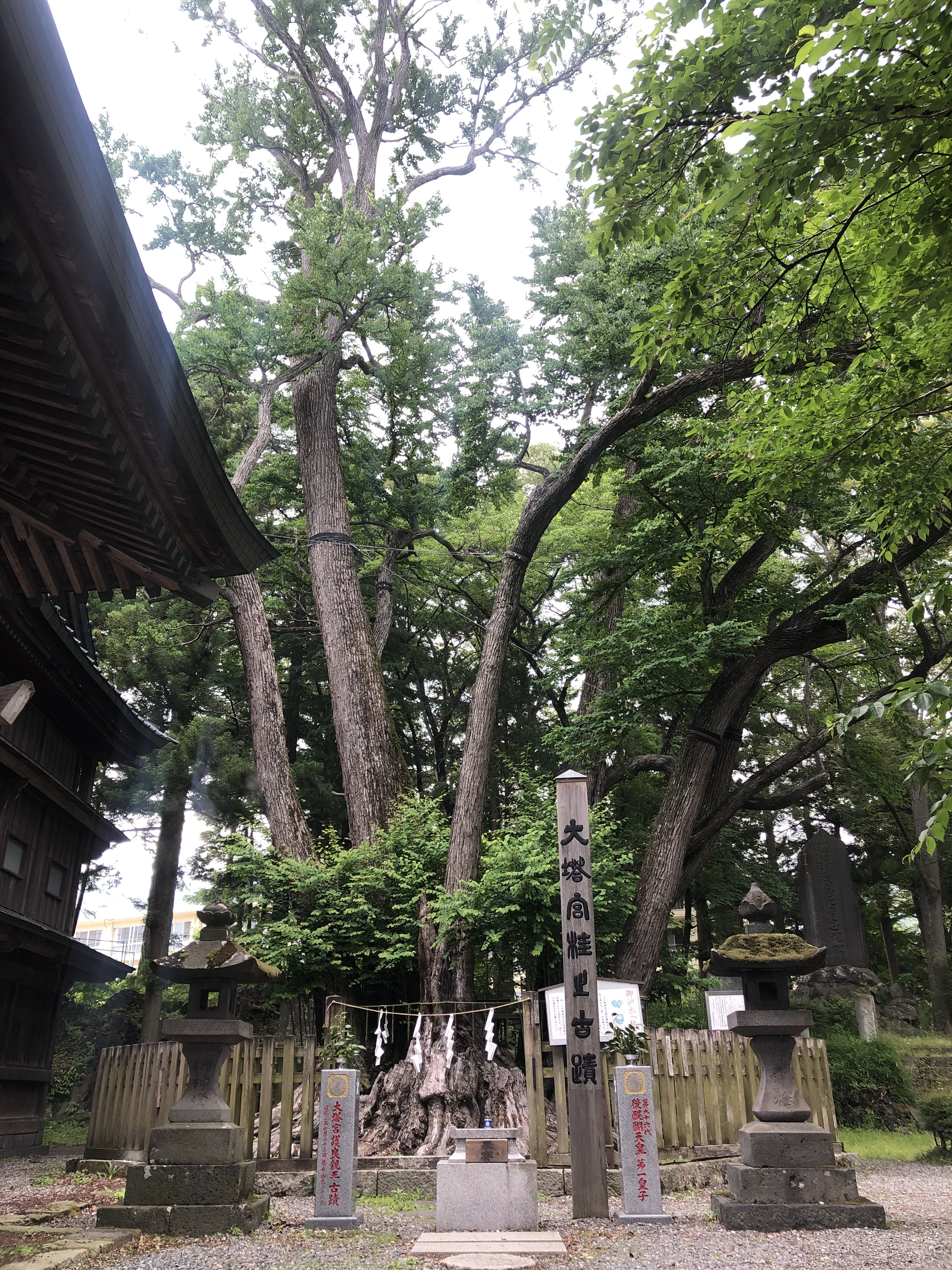
Ohtamiya Gora Prince Katsura's Ruins (Fujiyoshida City, Yamanashi)

A shinboku (神木) is a tree or forest worshipped as a shintai – a physical object of worship at or near a Shinto shrine, worshipped as a repository in which spirits or kami reside. They are often distinctly visible due to the shimenawa wrapped around them.

The related term goshingi refers to trees that are considered sacred or divine in the precincts of Shinto shrines and jingū of Shinto, as well as the forests that surround them and trees that are not grown for logging. It also refers to trees that are owned by shrines or by private individuals and have a special origin in folklore. It may also refer to trees that have been specially cut down for planting or growing wild to be used as timber for the construction of shrines.

== Overview ==
The nature worship called Himikura Shinto is also a part of the ancient Shinto religion. Out of gratitude, fear, and respect for God, life, and nature, symbolic objects in places where the environment changes were used as Shinto bodies, not limited to trees. In the thousands of years that have passed since this ancient Shinto, the form and style of shrines as vessels and rituals as inner life have been influenced by foreign religions or established independently, becoming Shinto shrines and other forms of Shinto.

Most of the tens of thousands of Shinto shrines in Japan were originally built on the site of Shinto shrines in the ancient Shinto religion, and this is why there are sacred trees, iwakura rock sects, steles and mounds exist and are enshrined in the precincts.

In some places, there is no shrine, but the sacred tree in its natural state is worshiped by many people. Evergreen trees with pointed branches are often used in Shinto rituals as tamagushi, a substitute for the gods to descend from. The most common type of skewer is sakaki, but since sakaki does not grow naturally in the north of the Kanto region, hisakaki and ogatama no ki (sacred tree) are sometimes used. Ogatama no ki are sometimes used. In general, a shi tadaku indicates a branch that has been cut down to be offered to the gods, while a sacred tree is one that is still rooted in the earth.

== Yorishiro ==
Kami-yorigi, also known as kanjinboku, are considered to be yorishiro of the gods, and are given special treatment, being decorated with shimenawa. The Nageia nagi is a yorishiro of the gods, and is also decorated with shimenawa. Many of them are Nageia nagi, mochinoki, and cedar.

In addition, some trees are treated as sacred trees, such as the cedar trees at Ise Grand Shrine, which are regarded as special trees separate from the gods in order to maintain the scenery or create a solemn atmosphere. For those who work in the mountains, a tree that stands out as a substitute for the god of the mountain may be temporarily treated as a sacred tree and enshrined.

The gohei, which is used in Shinto rituals and is made from sakaki and nagi, is also called a sacred tree, but it was originally a simple substitute for a naturally occurring sacred tree in ancient Shinto.

== Divine realms and boundaries ==
In ancient Shinto, the Shinto shrine was considered to be a place where the gods dwelled, a boundary between the everlasting world and the present world, and was feared and respected. In order to prevent people, things in this world, gods in this world, and things that bring misfortune and evil to this world from easily coming and going, shimenawa were hung as walls, making it a forbidden place. Even today, there are many places such as Okinoshima Island where not only the shrine, the sacred tree, or the forest of the local guardian, but the entire island is forbidden. In some places, rituals and festivals are held for a certain period of time when people want to bring good fortune and invite the gods in.

== Memorial tree ==
Memorial trees are trees donated by people who are related to the shrine, which are considered sacred and are treated as sacred trees.

== Construction tree ==
When building a shrine, the trees that will be used for its lumber are treated as sacred trees.

== See also ==
- Shinto shrine
- Chinju no Mori
- Wish tree
