= Te-ki-tsu =

Taiwanese folk religion of tutelary spirits of houses and buildings

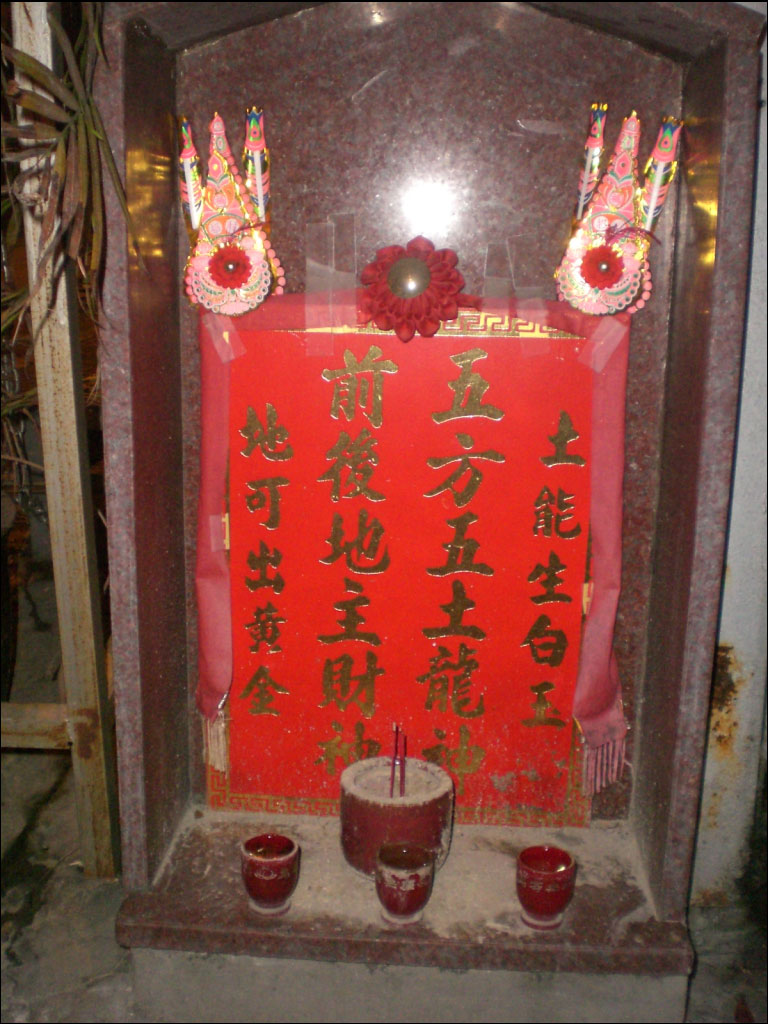
Taiwanese altar for a te-ki-tsu

Worship of Te-ki-tsu (地基主; Tē-ki-tsú; Dìjīzhǔ; Ti⁴-chi¹-chu³) is especially common in Taiwanese folk beliefs. Many institutions such as government agencies and companies will honor a Te-ki-tsu when moving into a new building.

Household altars to Te-ki-tsu are very common.

Such deities are ambiguous in their nature sometimes ghosts and sometimes deities. Sometimes considered the souls of former occupants Sometimes rituals for such deities is seen as moving the building from the yin world to the yang world (see yin miao for more information on Taiwanese beliefs on the yin world).

The tradition may originate with Taiwanese indigenous peoples and their practice of indoor burial, or burying people inside buildings.
