= Sorei =

Japanese term for the spirits of ancestors

The Japanese word Sorei (祖霊, lit. "Founder/Ancestor/Antecedent Spirit") refers to the spirits of ancestors: Specifically, it refers to the spirits of those ancestors that have been the target of special memorial services that have been held for them at certain fixed times after their death. The dates and the frequencies of these services vary widely depending on the region of Japan. Suitable occasions may for example be 33 and 50 years after death.

A special belief connected with sorei is the notion that the memorial services result in the ancestral spirit successively losing its individuality, eventually becoming an entirely deindividualized part of the collective of sorei. However, depending on the region, people may think that these services are merely aimed at properly disposing or pacifying the ancestral spirit.

The folklorist Yanagita Kunio has asserted that the rituals and ideas around sorei could be fitted into a general scheme whereby ancestors become not only protectors, but kami or ujigami. However, while it is possible that in the distant past such a development with regard to certain ancestors has occurred, according to other scholars that cannot be proven. Contemporary Japanese may, in relation to their recently dead, not think about the ancient notion of ujigami at all, but they do have a notion about the spirits of the dead becoming some sort of enlightened being. Indeed, another word for the departed soul is in Japanese hotoke, which also means Buddha.

== See also ==
- Glossary of Shinto
- Ujigami
