= Ujigami =

Shinto guardian god of a particular place

An ujigami (氏神; lit. 'clan deity/divinity/spirit') is a guardian kami of a particular place in the Shinto religion of Japan. The ujigami are prayed to for a number of reasons, including protection from sickness, success in endeavors, and good harvests.

== History ==
While the exact origin of ujigami is uncertain, the term is believed to have first appear in the eighth century. Some believe ujigami have their origins in the worship of ancestral kami who returned to the homes of their descendents to watch over them. In its current form, the term ujigami is used to describe several other types of Shinto deities. Originally, the term ujigami referred to a family or clan god. It is believed that, at first, these deities were worshiped at temporary altars.

After the Heian period, the Japanese manorial system was established and nobles, warriors and temples had their own private land, the family-based society fell out of use, and belief in ujigami diminished. In turn, the lords of the manors began to pray to the deities to protect their land. These guardian deities were referred to as chinju (鎮守). In the Muromachi period the manorial system declined, and so the guardian deities were enshrined along with the ujigami. An ubusunagami (産土神) is a god of the land of one's birth. Over time, the ubusunagami and chinju came to be seen as the heart of the community, and were eventually referred to as ujigami.

With the increased urbanization of Japan seen since the 1960s, people have become less connected to their home shrine and ujigami, though there have been attempts to reintroduce ujigami to places such as apartment complexes where many people live together who have come from different regions.

== Ujiko ==
The term ujiko (氏子) refers to a person or household belonging to the parish of an ujigami, bringing them under the kami's protection which traditionally came along with obligations to assist in shrine upkeep and event preparation.

Usually, the relationship between ujigami and ujiko is established when an individual undergoes an ujiko-iri (氏子入) ritual at the shrine of their family's ujigami or a shrine in the region in which they live. This is similar to miyamairi rituals which are held to introduce a child to their ubusunagami, the kami of the region they were born in, and it is common for one's ubusunagami to also be their ujigami.

While a child's miyamairi is not always their ujiko-iri, it has become common since the distinction between ujigami and ubusunagami has disappeared for miyamairi to also refer to ujiko-iri. Because of this, shrines often issue ujiko-fuda (氏子札; ujiko slip) to children at their miyamairi which acts as proof that they are ujiko of that shrine. At the same time, as worship of ujigami has declined over the generations, it is common among families who are not actively engaged in shrine activities or ujigami worship to not think of themselves as ujiko.

It is also common for the spouse who has newly entered their partner's family to attend an ujiko-iri in order to become an ujiko of the same ujigami as their new family. As the population of those engaged in shrine activities grows older and declines, fewer ujiko also engage in these activities and what had been an ujiko’s duty in terms of supporting the shrine and worshipping the ujigami have become nothing more than superficial rituals which often extend no further than the home in the act of placing kami seals (神璽, shinshi) or ujiko charms in their kamidana.

== Ujigami shrine ==
An ujigami shrine (氏社, ujisha, ujiyashiro) is a shrine dedicated to an ujigami. While their ujiko are generally from the local region, some ujigami shrines attempt to gather ujiko from further afield through the creation of unique aspects of worship at the shrine, such as pilgrimages or collaboration with corporations for their matsuri.

== See also ==
- Chinjugami
- Glossary of Shinto
- Hitogami
- Sorei
- Ubusunagami
- Uji (clan)

== Bibliography ==
- Tamaru, Noriyoshi; Reid, David; Abe, Yoshiya (1996). Religion in Japanese culture: where living traditions meet a changing world. Tokyo New York London: Kodansha international. ISBN 978-4-7700-2054-3.
- Reader, Ian (1991). Religion in contemporary Japan. Honolulu: University of Hawaii Press. ISBN 978-0-8248-1353-6.
