= Yorishiro =

Object capable of attracting spirits called kami

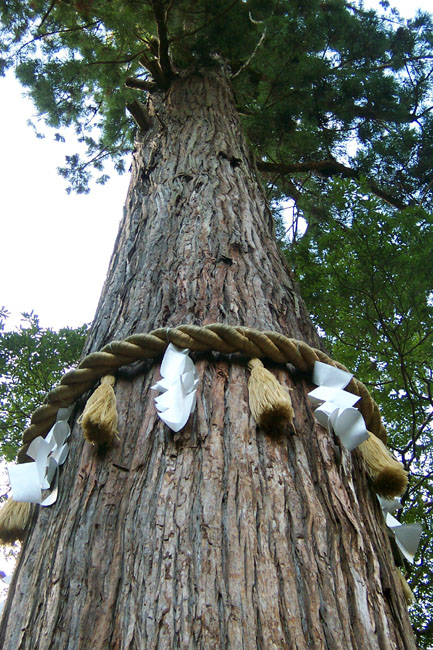
A classic yorishiro: a giant tree, or shinboku

A yorishiro (依り代/依代/憑り代/憑代) in Shinto terminology is an object capable of attracting spirits called kami, thus giving them a physical space to occupy during religious ceremonies. Yorishiro are used during ceremonies to call the kami for worship. The word itself literally means "approach substitute". Once a yorishiro actually houses a kami, it is called a shintai. Ropes called shimenawa decorated with paper streamers called shide often surround yorishiro to make their sacredness manifest. Persons can play the same role as a yorishiro, and in that case are called yorimashi (憑坐, lit. 'possessed person') or kamigakari (神懸り/神憑, lit. 'kami possession').

== History ==
Yorishiro and their history are intimately connected with the birth of Shinto shrines. Early Japanese culture did not have the notion of anthropomorphic deities, and felt the presence of spirits in nature and its phenomena. Mountains, forests, rain, wind, lightning and sometimes animals were thought to be charged with spiritual power, and the material manifestations of this power were worshiped as kami, entities closer in essence to the Oceanian concept of mana. Village councils sought the advice of kami and developed the yorishiro, tools that attracted kami acting like a lightning rod.

Yorishiro were conceived to attract the kami and then give them a physical space to occupy to make them accessible to human beings for ceremonies, which is still their purpose today. Village council sessions were held in a quiet spot in the mountains or in a forest near a great tree, rock or other natural object that served as a yorishiro. These sacred places and their yorishiro gradually evolved into the shrines of today.

The first buildings at shrines were likely just huts built to house some yorishiro. A trace of this origin can be found in the term hokura (神庫), literally meaning "deity storehouse", which evolved into hokora (also written with the characters 神庫), one of the earliest words for a shrine. Most of the sacred objects found today in shrines (trees, mirrors, swords, magatama) were originally yorishiro, and only later became kami themselves by association.

== Common yorishiro ==
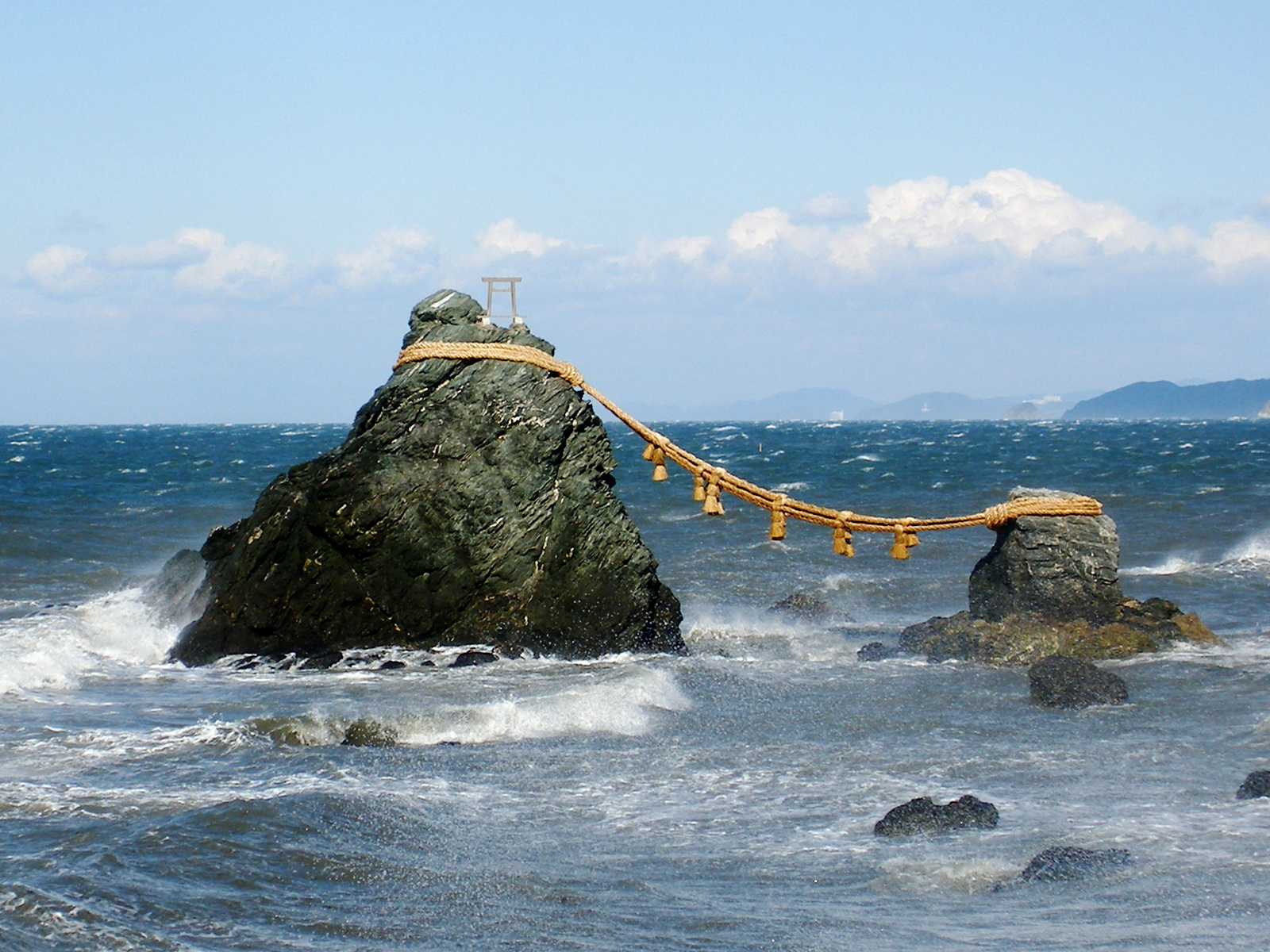
Two iwakura: Meoto Iwa, the Husband-and-Wife Rocks

The most common yorishiro are swords, mirrors, ritual staffs decorated with paper streamers called gohei, comma-shaped beads called magatama (勾玉/曲玉), large rocks (iwasaka (岩境) or iwakura (磐座), and sacred trees. Kami are often considered to dwell in unusually-shaped rocks or trees, or in caves and earth mounds. Yorishiro can also be persons, in which case they are called yorimashi (憑坐). Kami can also be believed to possess animals acting as their familiars, in which case the terms tsukawashime or osakigami are used."

=== Trees ===
Because of the emphasis on nature in Shinto, yorishiro are often natural objects like trees. Significantly, in ancient Japanese texts the words jinja (神社, "shrine"; jinja being the most typical modern reading) and 社 were sometimes read as yashiro ("sacred place"), but also sometimes read as mori ("grove" or "forest"), reflecting the fact that the earliest shrines were simply sacred groves or forests where kami were present.

Part of the reading disparity may have been due to the confusion between similar characters 社 and 杜. Many shrines still have on their grounds one of the original great yorishiro, a great tree surrounded by a sacred rope called shimenawa (標縄/注連縄/七五三縄). Now such trees have become divine by association, and no longer simply represent a kami.

Shinto altars, called himorogi – typically just square areas demarcated with sakaki (Cleyera japonica) at the corners supporting sacred border ropes (shimenawa) – feature a branch of sakaki erected at the center as a yorishiro.

=== Iwakura ===
Iwakura rocks are also common. An iwakura is simply a rock formation where a kami is invited to descend, and is therefore holy ground. With time, through a process of association, the iwakura itself can come to be considered divine. Archeological research in Japan confirms these sects to be ancient. In shrines, even today stones considered to be related to the shrine's kami are used to make food offerings to the kami.

Similarly an iwasaka (磐境) is a stone altar or mound erected as a yorishiro to call a kami for worship. The concepts of iwasaka and iwakura are so close that some suggest the two words are in fact synonymous.

=== In homes ===
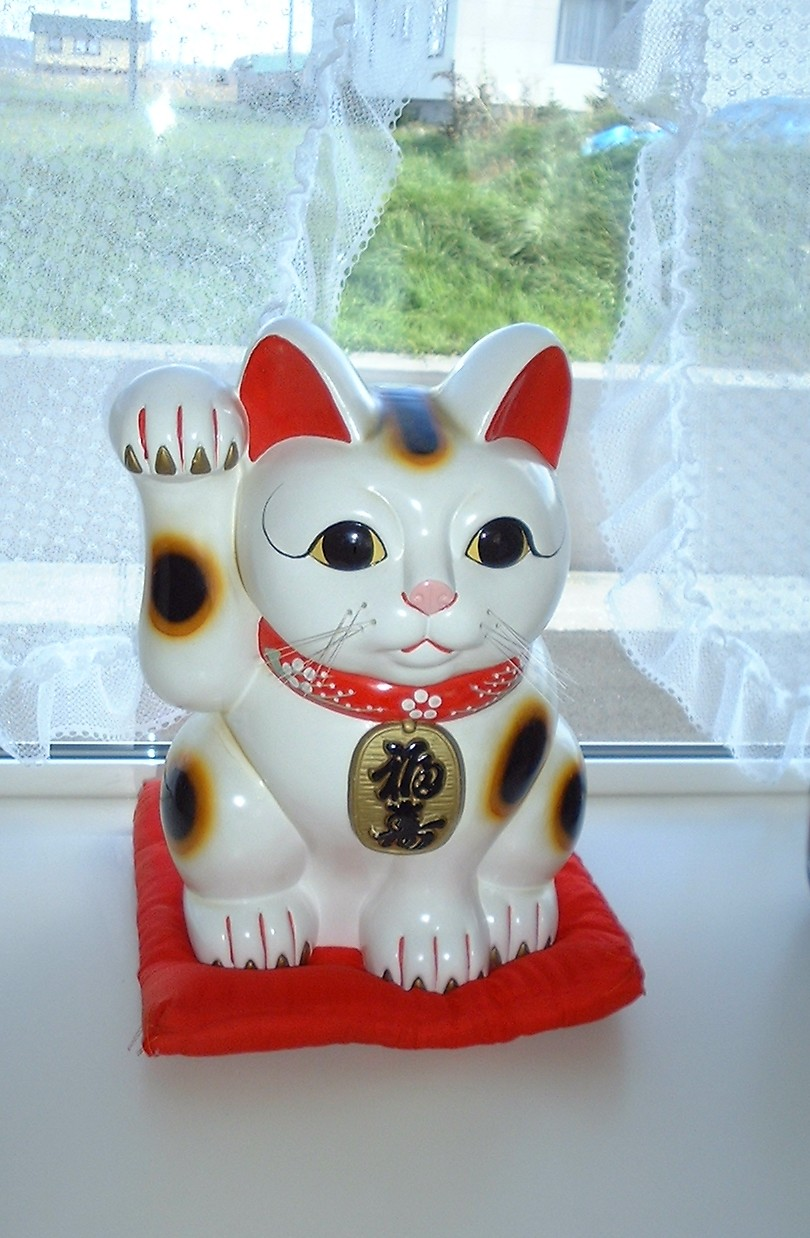
A maneki-neko is supposed to attract the kami of luck.

Yorishiro are most numerous in people's homes. During the New Year's holidays, people decorate their entrances with kadomatsu, which are the yorishiro of the new year's kami. Kamifuda, plaques of wood or pieces of paper (similar to an ofuda) representing the kami, are hung above the door. There are kami who dwell in the toilet (benjō-gami) and in the well (suijin). The kamado-gami lives in the oven, and its function is to protect the house from fires.

Other common yorishiro are the small altar called kamidana and the butsudan, which is an altar for the dead. (Butsudan were originally meant just for Buddhist worship, but now often contain also spirit tablets called ihai, which are yorishiro used to recall the spirits of one's dead ancestors). In shops one often sees clay cats with a raised paw called maneki-neko, or rake-like bamboo objects called kumade supposed to attract good business.

=== In zoology ===
Yorishiro morii Bassi & Iryu, 2026: this species of tubular foraminifer found in the Ryukyu Islands is named in honour of Mr. (shihan) Toshihiro Mori (Watari, Miyagi, Japan), for his outstanding contribution to the study of karate (Japan Karate Association), providing instruction and dissemination, and influencing children and adolescents to cultivate the spirit of karate within the Japanese culture.

== See also ==
- Anito
- Balete tree
- Glossary of Shinto
- Himorogi
- Shintai
- Hokora
