= Miyamairi =

Shinto rite of passage

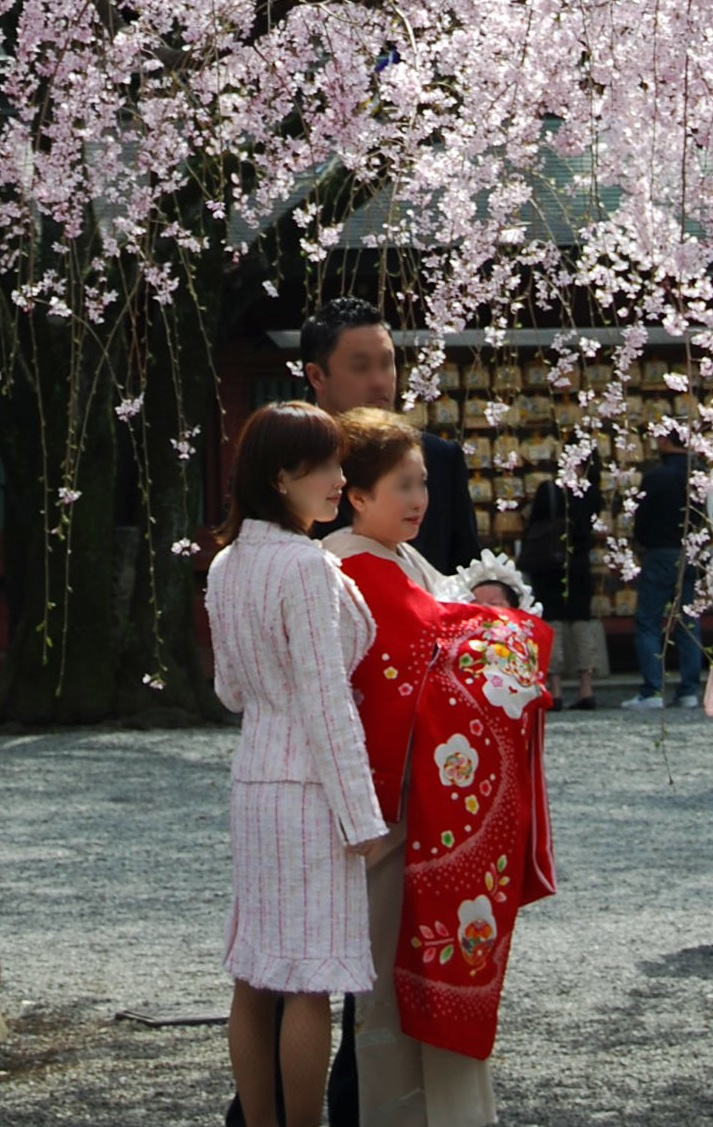
Attending a miyamairi at a shrine in Tokyo

Miyamairi (宮参り, literally "shrine visit") is a traditional Shinto rite of passage in Japan for newborns. Approximately one month after birth (31 days for boys and 33 days for girls), parents and grandparents bring the child to a Shinto shrine, to express gratitude to the deities for the birth of a baby and have a shrine priest pray for their health and happiness. The rite is also known by several other names (hiake, hibare, ubuake, or shimeage) marking the end of the child's period of ritual taboo; the exact timing varies by region, in some cases falling as early as the seventh day after birth or as late as the hundredth day. Beyond expressing gratitude for the child's birth, the miyamairi also serves as the ceremony through which the child is socially recognized as an ujiko, a member of the local tutelary kami's (ujigami) community of worshippers.

Today, most Miyamairi are practiced between one month and 100 days after birth. In famous and busy shrines, the ceremony is held every hour, often during weekends. A group of a dozen babies and their families are usually brought into the hall, one group after another. A Shinto priest wearing a costume and headgear appears between the group and the altar, reciting a prayer and swinging a tamagushi right and left. During the prayer, the priest cites the name of the baby, the names of the parents, the family's address, and the baby's birthday. Afterwards, the parents and grandparents come forward one by one, bow to the altar, and place tamagushis upon it.

At the end of the ceremony, sake in a red wooden cup is given to each person in attendance; small gifts are often given to the family.

A shrine typically charges between ¥5,000 and ¥10,000 per baby for this ceremony.
