= Kasugayama Primeval Forest =

Primeval forest in Nara, Japan

Kasugayama Primeval Forest Japanese: 春日山原始林
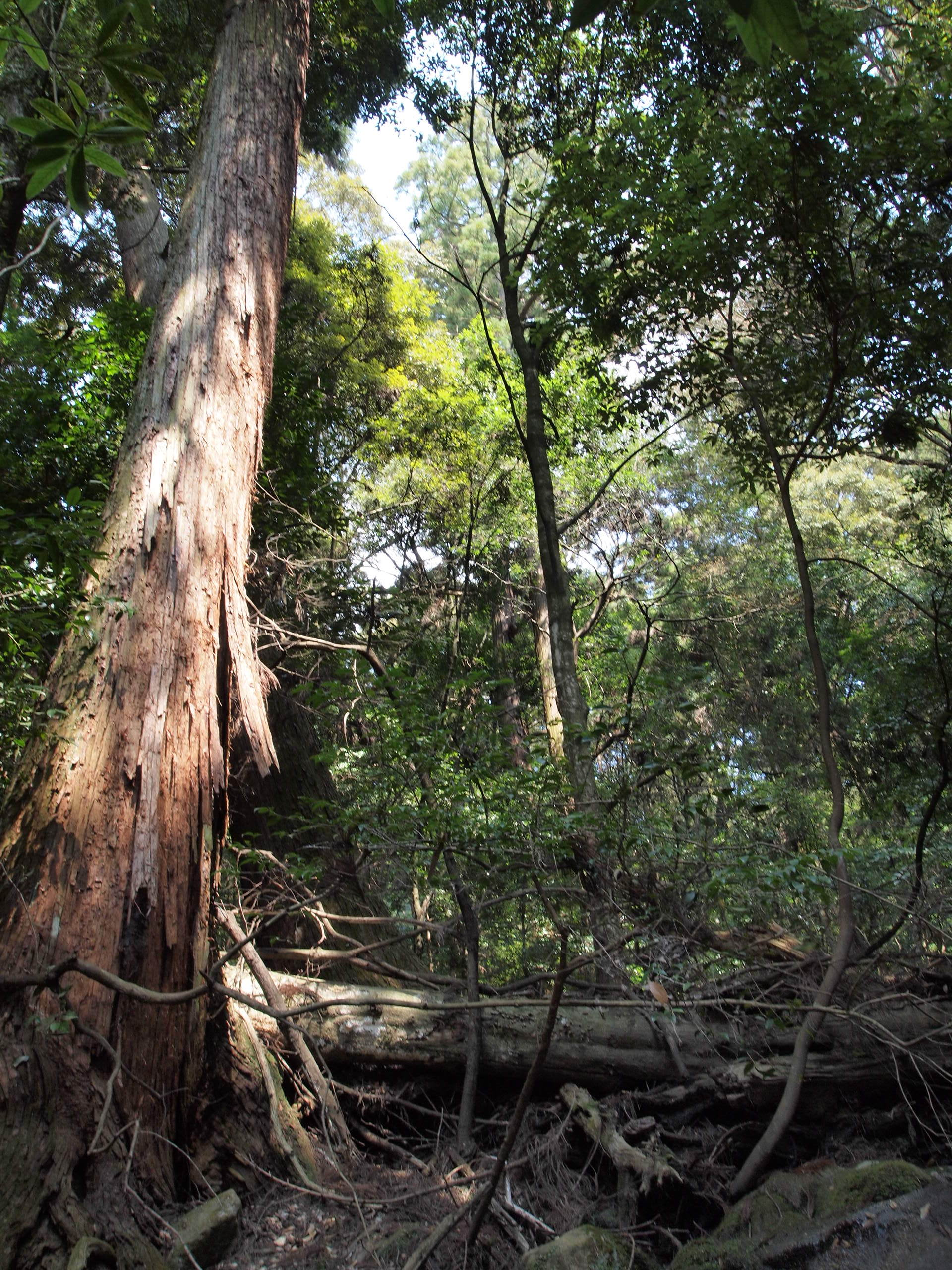

- Location within Nara Prefecture Location within Japan

Geography
- Location: Nara Park, Nara, Nara Prefecture, Japan
- Coordinates: 34°41′3.5″N 135°51′52.3″E
- Area: 298.6 hectares (738 acres)

Kasugayama Primeval Forest (春日山原始林, Kasugaya-yama genshi-rin) is an area of 298.6 hectares (738 acres) of primeval forest in Nara, Japan, that is protected as a Special Natural Monument and which forms part of the UNESCO World Heritage Site Historic Monuments of Ancient Nara. Located in Nara Park to the east of the grounds of Kasuga Taisha and a Chinju no Mori, hunting and logging on Mount Kasuga have been prohibited since 841.

== History ==
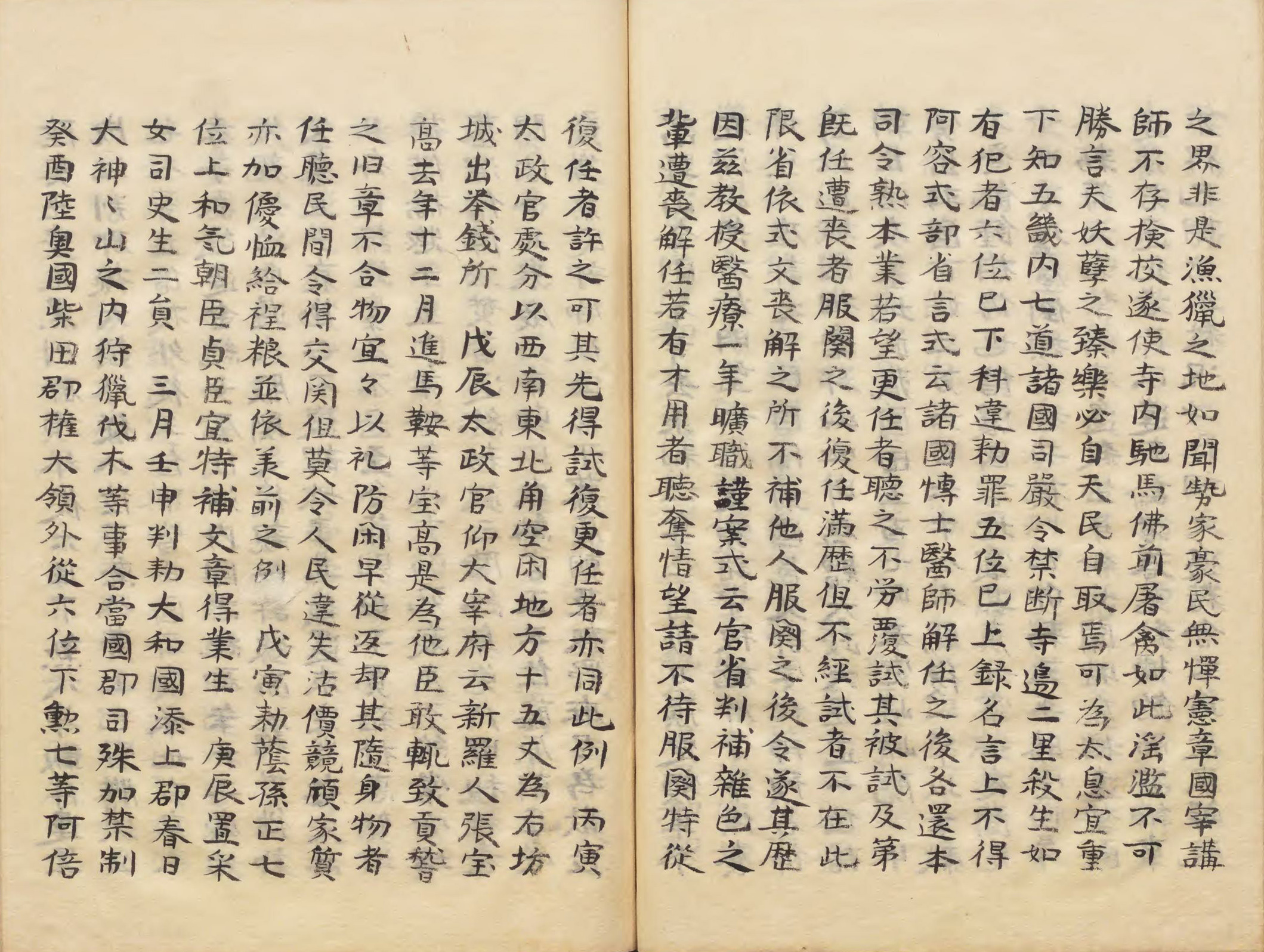
The prohibition, in the tenth volume of Shoku Nihon Kōki
(antepenultimate and penultimate lines, left page)

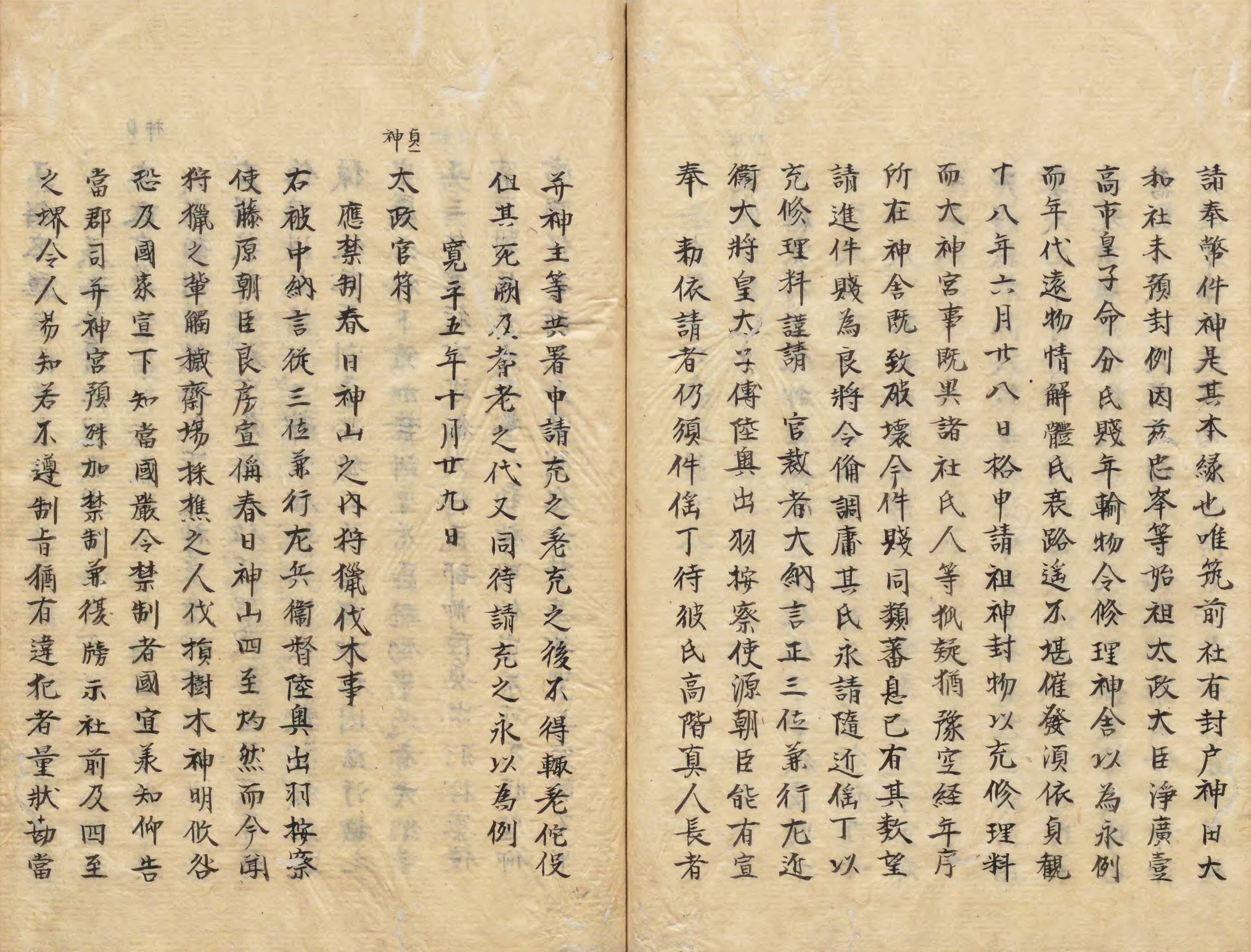
The background to the prohibition, in the first volume of Ruijū Sandai Kyaku
(left-hand page)

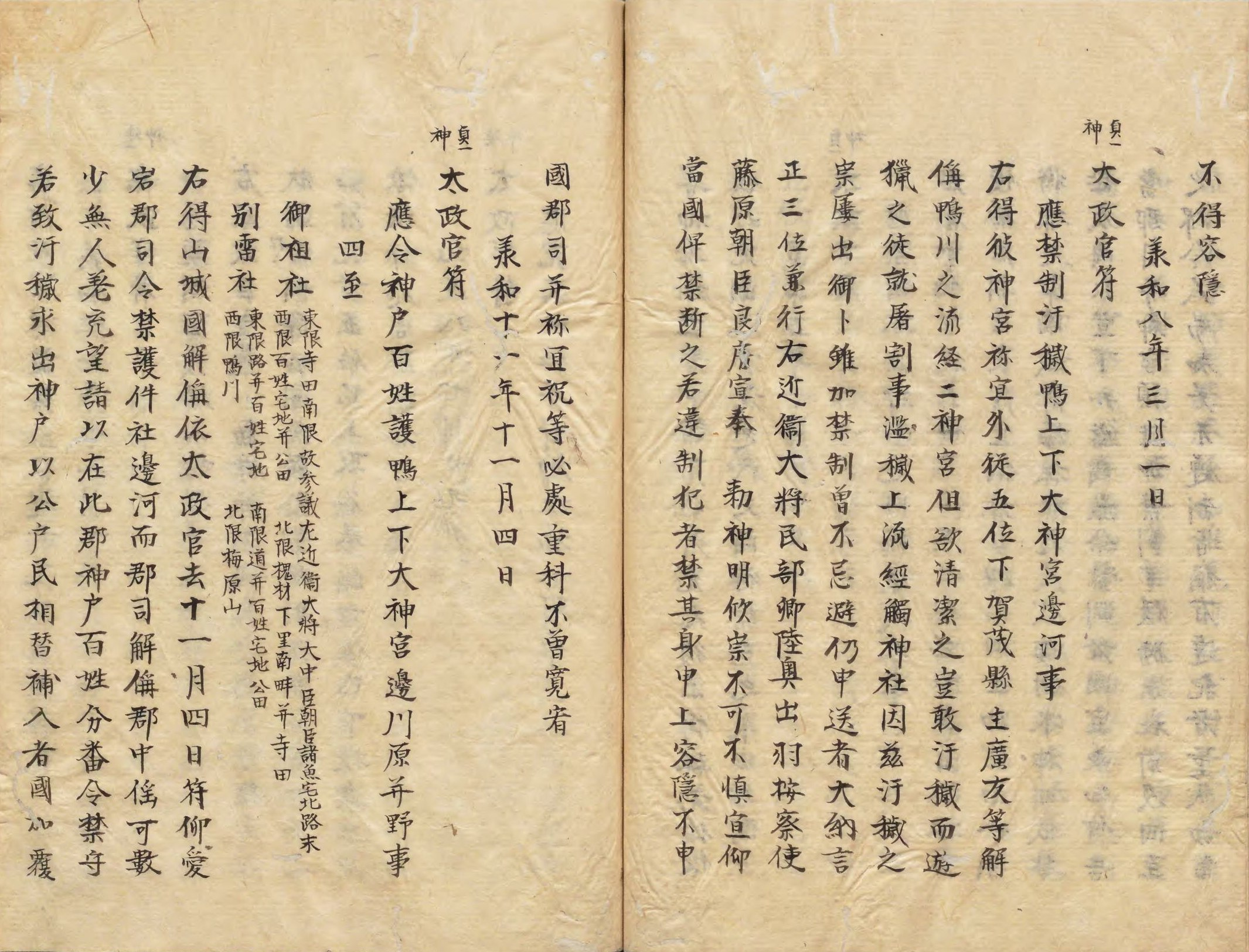
The date, in the continuation of the same: the first day of the third month of Jōwa 8 (841)
(second line, right-hand page)

In 841, during the reign of Emperor Ninmyō, a prohibition was placed on hunting and logging on the sacred mountain. In 1873, the Daijō-kan issued a proclamation on the establishment of public parks, and in 1880 Nara Park opened. This was extended in 1888 to include the areas of Mount Kasuga and Mount Wakakusa; that same year, some two thousand trees on Mount Kasuga were felled by a typhoon. In 1922, Nara Park was designated a Place of Scenic Beauty under the 1919 Historical Sites, Places of Scenic Beauty, and Natural Monuments Preservation Law. Two years later, Kasugayama Primeval Forest was designated a Natural Monument, a designation upgraded in 1955 to that of Special Natural Monument, under the 1950 Law for the Protection of Cultural Properties.

== See also ==
- List of World Heritage Sites in Japan
- List of Special Places of Scenic Beauty, Special Historic Sites and Special Natural Monuments
- List of Natural Monuments of Japan (Nara)
- List of Places of Scenic Beauty of Japan (Nara)
- List of Historic Sites of Japan (Nara)
- Protected Forests (Japan)
