= Hokora =

Miniature Shinto shrine

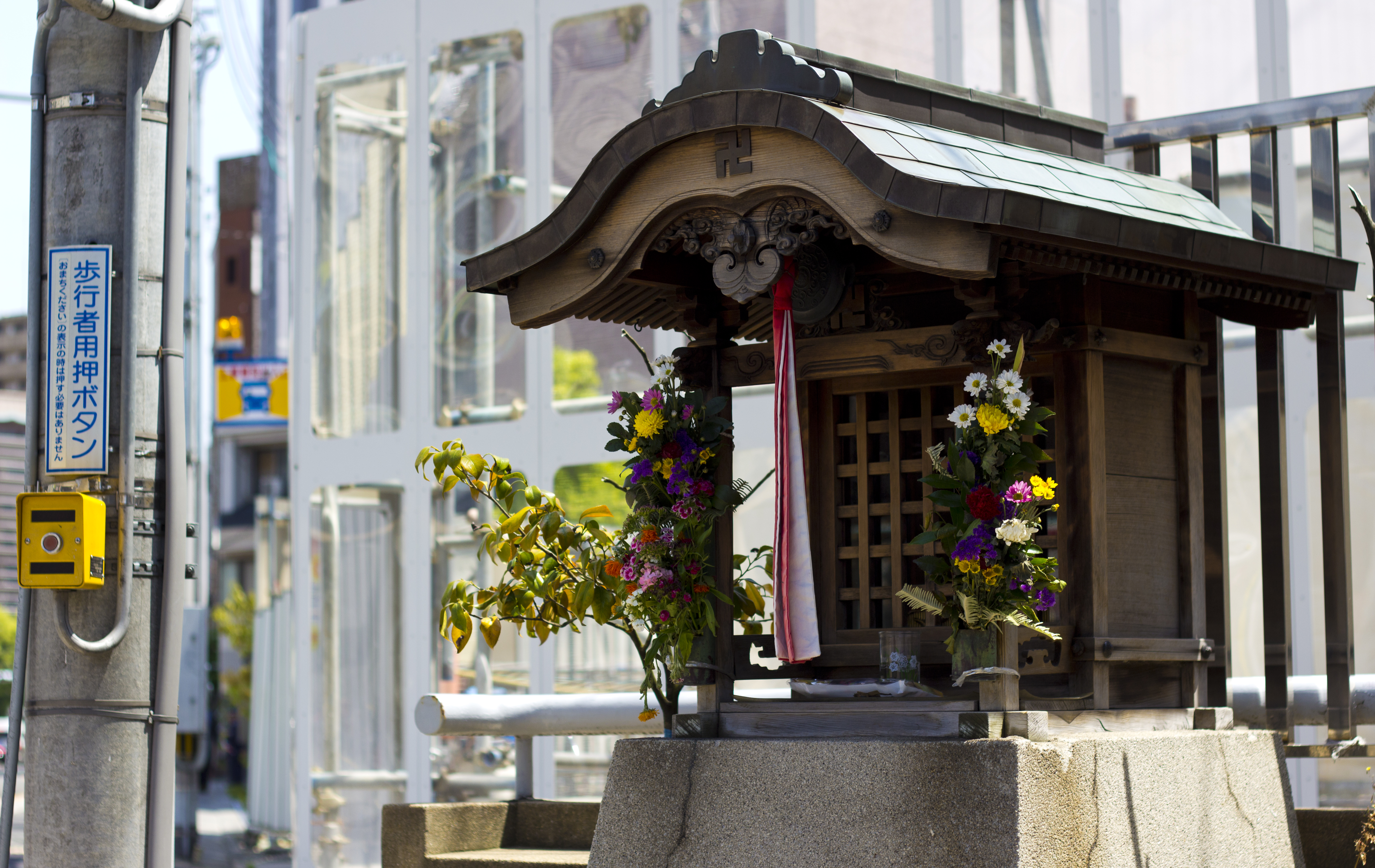
A small hokora in Kyoto. Though the hokora are usually categorized as Shintoist, they are often decorated with a swastika which in Japan is a symbol associated with Buddhism. In Kyoto especially, many hokora are actually dedicated to Kannon, a bodhisattva, rather than Shinto deities.

The character 祠

Hokora or hokura (祠 or 神庫) is a miniature Shinto shrine either found on the precincts of a larger shrine and dedicated to folk kami, or on a street side, enshrining kami not under the jurisdiction of any large shrine. Dōsojin, minor kami protecting travelers from evil spirits, can for example be enshrined in a hokora.

The term hokora, believed to have been one of the first Japanese words for Shinto shrine, evolved from hokura (神庫), literally meaning "kami repository", a fact that seems to indicate that the first shrines were huts built to house some yorishiro. (Note: The word yorishiro (依り代) literally means approach substitute. Yorishiro were tools conceived to attract the kami and give them a physical space to occupy, thus making them accessible to human beings.)

== See also ==
- Glossary of Shinto
- Setsumatsusha
- Spirit house
- Aedicula
