= List of Japanese deities =

This is a list of divinities native to Japanese beliefs and religious traditions. Many of these are from Shinto, while others were imported via Buddhism and were "integrated" into Japanese mythology and folklore.

== Kotoamatsukami ==
- Ame no Minakanushi (天之御中主神) – Lord of the August Center of Heaven
- Takamimusubi (高御産巣日神) – Exalted Generative Force
- Kamimusubi (神産巣日神) – Sacred Generative Force
- Umashiashikabihikoji (宇摩志阿斯訶備比古遅神) – Elderly Prince Reed-Shoot
- Ame no Tokotachi (天之常立神) – Ever-Standing Heaven

== Kamiyonanayo ==
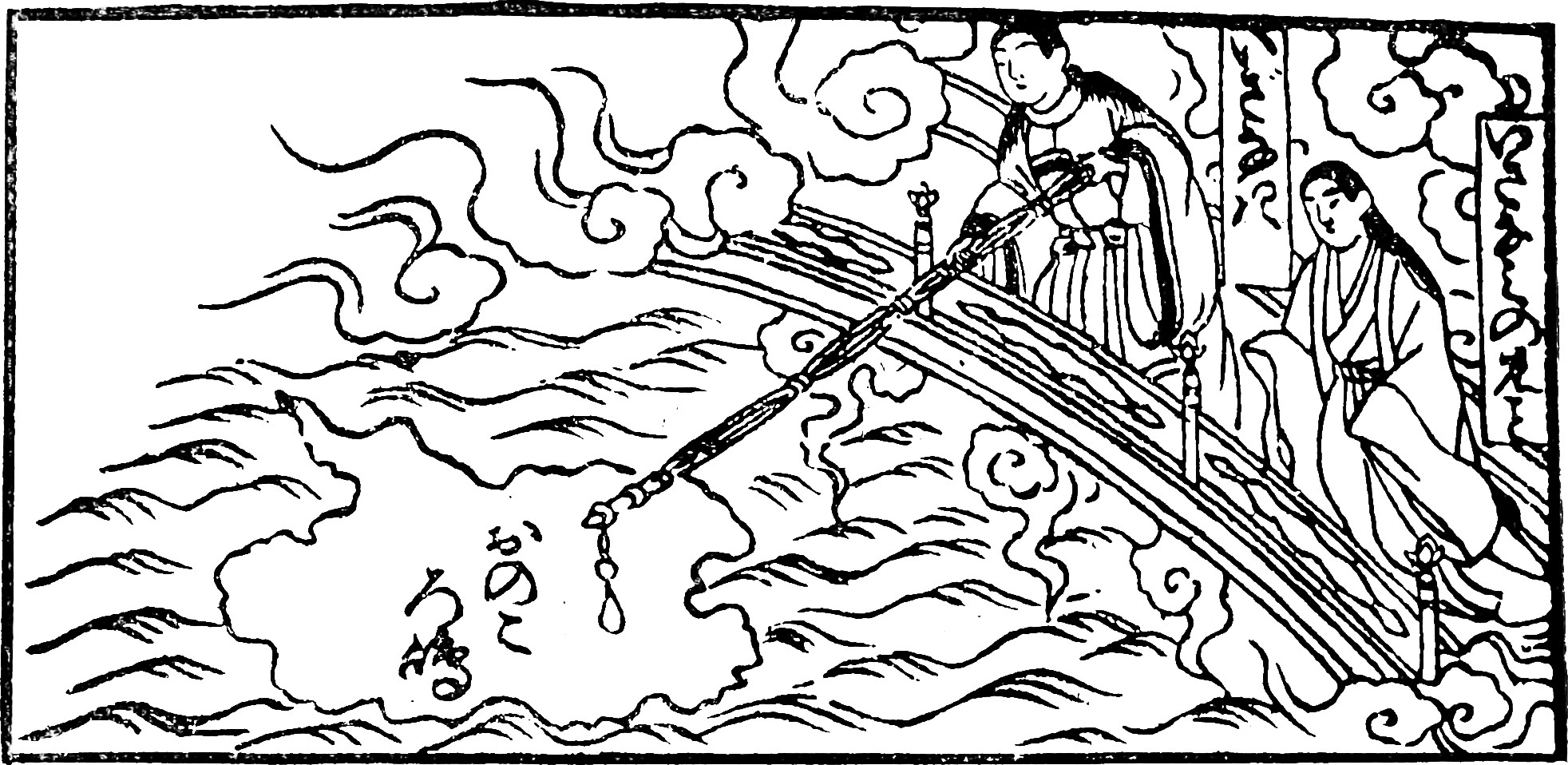
Izanagi and Izanami on the Floating Bridge of Heaven (by William George Aston)

- Izanagi: (伊邪那岐神) was a creation deity; he makes up the seventh generation of the Kamiyonanayo, along with his wife and sister, Izanami.
- Izanami: (伊邪那美神) was a creation deity; she makes up the seventh generation of the Kamiyonanayo, along with her husband and brother, Izanagi.
- Kuni no Tokotachi (国之常立神) was a deity classified as a hitorigami. He was, by himself, the first generation of the Kamiyonanayo. He was considered one of the first two gods, according to the Kojiki, or one of the first three gods, according to the Nihongi.
- Omodaru and Ayakashikone: (淤母陀琉神 and 阿夜訶志古泥神) Sixth generation of the Kamiyonanayo.
- Otonoji and Otonobe: (意富斗能地神 and 大斗乃弁神) Fifth generation of the Kamiyonanayo.
- Toyokumono: (豊雲野神) was a hitorigami, and constituted the second generation of the Kamiyonanayo.
- Tsunugui and Ikugui: (角杙神 and 活杙神) Fourth generation of the Kamiyonanayo.
- Uhijini and Suhijini: (宇比邇神 and 須比智邇神) Third generation of the Kamiyonanayo.

== Major kami ==
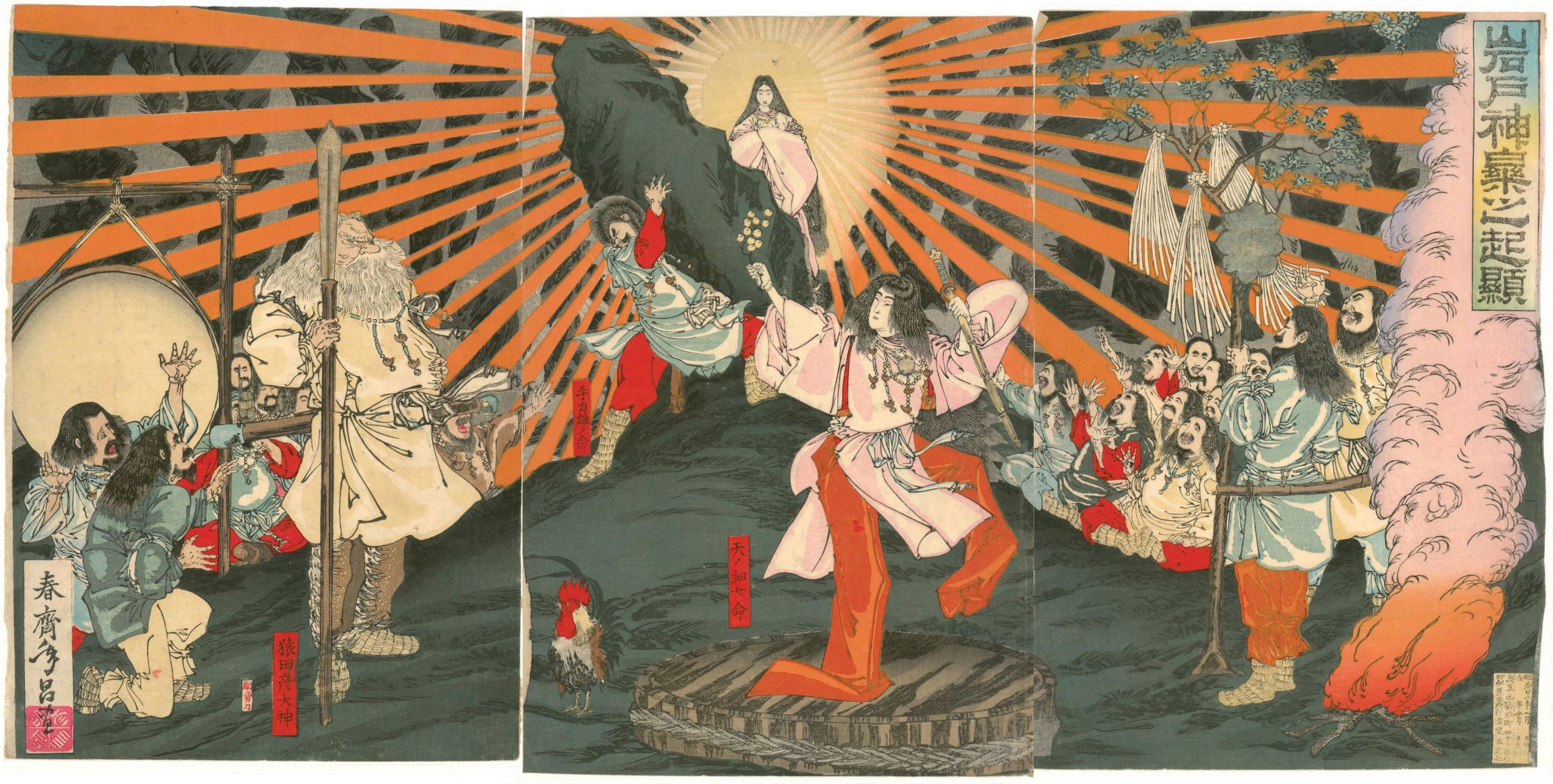
The Amaterasu-Ōmikami emerges from the Heavenly Rock Cave Shunsai Toshimasa (春斎年昌)

- Amaterasu-Ōmikami (天照大神), she is the goddess of the sun as well as the purported ancestress of the Imperial Household of Japan. Her name means "Shines from Heaven" or "the great kami who shine Heaven". For many reasons, one among them being her ties to the Imperial family, she is often considered (though not officially) to be the "primary god" of Shinto.
- Ame-no-Uzume (天宇受売命 or 天鈿女命) Commonly called Uzume, she is the goddess of dawn and revelry in Shinto.
- Fūjin (風神) Also known as Kaze-no-kami, he is the Japanese god of the wind and one of the eldest Shinto gods, said to have been present at the creation of the world. He is often depicted as an oni with a bag slung over his back.
- Hachiman (八幡神) is the god of war and the divine protector of Japan and its people. Originally an agricultural deity, he later became the guardian of the Minamoto clan. His symbolic animal and messenger is the dove.
- Inari Ōkami (稲荷大神) The god or goddess of rice and fertility. Their messengers and symbolic animal are foxes. They are often identified with Ukanomitama and Buddhist deity Dakiniten.
- Ninigi-no-Mikoto (瓊瓊杵尊) Commonly called Ninigi, he was the grandson of Amaterasu. His great-grandson was Kan'yamato Iwarebiko, later known as Emperor Jimmu, the first emperor of Japan.
- Ōkuninushi (大国主) A god of nation-building, farming, business, and medicine.
- Omoikane (思兼) The deity of wisdom and intelligence, who is always called upon to "ponder" and give good counsel in the deliberations of the heavenly deities.
- Ōmononushi (大物主神) in the Nihongi, Ōmononushi was considered an alternate name for Ōkuninushi. But, it appears that the two were separate kami.
- Raijin (雷神) is the god of thunder and lightning and is often paired with Fūjin. As with the latter, Raijin is usually depicted as an oni.
- Ryūjin (龍神) Some traditions consider him and Ōwatatsumi as the same god. He is a dragon, as well as god of the sea.
- Suijin (水神) The god of water.
- Susanoo-no-Mikoto (須佐之男命 or 素戔嗚尊) is a god of storms, as well as the ruler of the sea in some cases. He is also somewhat of a trickster god, as Japanese mythology extensively documents the "sibling rivalry" between him and Amaterasu. Susanoo was also responsible for the slaying of the monster Yamata no Orochi and the subsequent discovery of the sacred sword Kusanagi.
- Takemikazuchi, (建御雷/武甕槌) known as a god of thunder and the god of swords.
- Takeminakata, (建御名方) god of wind, water and agriculture, as well as a patron of hunting and warfare.
- Toyotama-hime (豊玉姫) was the daughter of Ryūjin and the grandmother of Emperor Jimmu. It is said that after she gave birth to her son, she turned into a dragon and disappeared.
- Tsukuyomi-no-Mikoto (月読命 or 月夜見尊) is the god of the moon. He killed Ukemochi, out of disgust and anger in the way she had prepared a meal. This caused Amaterasu never to face him again, causing the sun and moon to be in different parts of the sky.
- Yatagarasu (八咫烏) is an incarnation of the sun and the guide of Emperor Jimmu.

== Minor kami ==
- Ajisukitakahikone (阿遅鉏高日子根神) is a kami of agriculture and thunder.
- Amanozako (天逆毎)
- Amatsuhikone, considered the third son of Amaterasu.
- Amatsumara (天津麻羅), the kami of iron-working.
- Amatsu-Mikaboshi (天津甕星), the kami of stars who existed before the Kotoamatsukami.
- Amenohoakari, (天火明命) a sun and agriculture god.
- Ame-no-hohi (天菩比神, 天穂日命) considered the second son of Amaterasu.
- Ame-no-Koyane (天児屋命 or 天児屋根命) A male deity, he is considered the "First in Charge of Divine Affairs," as well as the aide to the first Emperor of Japan. He is also considered to be the ancestor of the Fujiwara family.
- Ame-no-Naemasu (天苗加命), said to be son of Futsunushi.
- Ame-no-oshihomimi (天忍穂耳命)
- Ame-no-Tajikarao (アメノタジカラオ), in some traditions, is the kami that pulls Amaterasu out of Ama-no-Iwato.
- Ame-no-wakahiko (天若日子, 天稚彦) God of grains.
- Atago Gongen (愛宕権現)
- Azumi-no-isora (阿曇磯良) is a kami of the seashore. He is considered to be the ancestor of the Azumi people.
- Dojin (土神), is a Japanese god of earth, land, and/or soil.
- Futodama (布刀玉命) is a kami who performed a divination when Amaterasu hid in a cave.
- Futsunushi (経津主神) Main deity at Katori Shrine.
- Haniyasu no kami, two deities born from Izanami's feces.
- Hoderi (火照命) was a deity of the bounty of the sea and enchanted fisherman.
- Hoori (火折尊)
- Isetsuhiko (伊勢都彦命), a god of the wind.
- Ishikori-dome no Mikoto (石凝姥命), the god of metalworking.
- Kagu-tsuchi (カグツチ), the kami of fire.
- Kajin (火神), is a god of fire.
- Kanayago-kami/Kanayako-kami (金屋子神), a Kami of metal and metalworking, who, as believed by blacksmiths, lives mainly in the Chūgoku Region. Similar to Inari, Kanayago can be either male or female.
- Kawaya no Kami, kami of the toilet.
- Kawa-no-Kami, a god of rivers.
- Kaya-no-hime, the goddess of vegetation, grass and fields.
- Kisshōten (吉祥天), goddess of good fortune; also known as Kichijōten, Kisshoutennyo (吉祥天女), and as Kudokuten (功徳天), Kisshōten is the Shinto adaption, via Buddhism, from the Hindu goddess, Lakshmi.
- Kōjin (三宝荒神), is the god of fire, the hearth, and the kitchen.
- Konjin (金神)
- Kotoshironushi (事代主神)
- Kuebiko (久延毘古), the god of knowledge and agriculture, represented in Japanese mythology as a scarecrow who cannot walk but has comprehensive awareness.
- Kukunochi, believed to be the ancestor of trees.
- Kukurihime no Kami (菊理媛神), a goddess enshrined at Shirayama Hime Shrine.
- Kuraokami (闇龗) is a legendary Japanese dragon and Shinto deity of rain and snow.
- Kushinadahime
- Kuzuryū, minor water deity.
- Mizuhanome, water kami.
- Moreya (洩矢神)
- Nakisawame, kami born from Izanagi's tears after his wife's death.
- Nesaku, a star god.
- Oshirasama (おしら様)
- Sarutahiko Ōkami (猿田毘古神), a kami of the Earth that guided Ninigi to the Japanese islands.
- Seidai Myōjin, god of sports, enshrined at Shiramine Jingū in Kyoto, especially worshipped for kemari and football.
- Shinatsuhiko, a kami of wind.
- Sukuna-Biko-Na (少名毘古那) A small deity of medicine and rain, who created and solidified the land with Ōkuninushi.
- Sumiyoshi sanjin, the gods of the sea and sailing.
- Tajimamori (田道間守), god who obtained the tokijiku no kagu no mi in Tokoyo-no-kuni, and hailed as "god of wagashi" (sweets, confections).
- Tamanoya-no-Mikoto, a kami believed to be the creator of Yasakani no Magatama.
- Takitsuhiko a kami believed to bring forth rain.
- Tamayori-hime, mother of Emperor Jimmu.
- Ta-no-Kami (田の神), is a kami who is believed to observe the harvest of rice plants or to bring a good harvest, by Japanese farmers.
- Tatsuta-hime and Tatsuta-hiko, pair of wind kami who bring forth autumn.
- Nigihayahi-no-mikoto (饒速日尊)
- Toyouke-Ōmikami, goddess of food. She is also the daughter of Wakumusubi.
- Tsugenoinagi, a kami of ice.
- Ugajin, a harvest and fertility kami represented with the body of a snake and head of a man or woman. They may be derived from Ukanomitama.
- Ugayafukiaezu, the father of Japan's first emperor.
- Ukanomitama, a kami associated with food and agriculture.
- Ukemochi (保食神), is considered a goddess of food. After she vomited out various types of food, she was killed by a disgusted Tsukuyomi or Susanoo.
- Wakahiru-me, a kami of the rising sun, considered the daughter or younger sister of Amaterasu.
- Wakumusubi, a kami of agriculture.
- Watatsumi is considered by some traditions to be the same god as Ryujin.

== Yama-no-Kami ==
- Konohanasakuya-hime (木花之開耶姫), the wife of Ninigi and daughter of Ōyamatsumi, and great-grandmother of Jimmu. She is also known as the goddess of Mount Fuji.
- Omonoimi no Kami ( 大物忌神), god of Mount Chōkai, worshipped at Chōkaisan Ōmonoimi Shrine, identified with Toyouke-hime
- Ōyamatsumi (大山積神), an elder brother of Amaterasu, and an important god of mountains. Also the father of Konohanasakuya-hime.

== People worshipped as kami ==
This section includes historical people worshipped as kami.

- Emperor Jimmu (神武天皇) the first emperor. Enshrined at Kashihara Shrine.
- Emperor Meiji (明治天皇), and Empress Shōken (昭憲皇太后). Enshrined at Meiji Shrine.
- Oda Nobunaga (織田信長) enshrined at Kenkun-jinja.
- Shōtoku Taishi was sometimes worshipped by Shintoists in Prince's Hall (太子堂 Taishido) as the Kami of building trade and easy birth, like in the Hokai-ji of Kamakura.
- Tenjin (天神) The god of scholarship, he is the deified Sugawara no Michizane. Subsequent disasters in Heiankyo were attributed to his angered spirit.
- Tokugawa Ieyasu (徳川家康) enshrined at Nikkō Tōshō-gū and similar shrines.
- Toyotomi Hideyoshi (豊臣秀吉) enshrined at Toyokuni-jinja.

All Emperors and Empresses of Japan are technically worshipped because of their descent from Amaterasu Ōmikami, but there are many esteemed and highly revered ones who are not enshrined.

== Buddhism ==
- Aizen Myō-ō (愛染明王), a Wisdom King known to transform earthly desires (love/lust) into spiritual awakening.
- Amida Nyorai (無量光佛 or 無量壽佛), commonly referred to as Amida-butsu (阿弥陀如来), he is the primary Buddha of the Pure Land school of Buddhism. He is believed to possess infinite meritorious qualities and is known as the "Lord of the Beyond and the Afterlife." He is one of the Five Dhyani Buddhas.
- Daruma (達磨), traditionally held in Buddhist mythology to be the founder of Zen Buddhism, as well as the founder of Shaolin Kung Fu. One legend reports that after years of facing a wall in meditation, Bodhidharma's legs and arms fall off due to atrophy. Daruma dolls were created in honor of this legend.
- Fudō Myōō (不動明王), a fierce and wrathful Wisdom King who protects all by burning away impediments and defilements, and aiding them towards enlightenment.
- Idaten (韋駄天), guardian of Buddhist monasteries and monks.
- Jizō (地蔵), a Bodhisattva known as the protector of the vulnerable, especially children, travelers, and expectant mothers. He is also regarded as the patron deity of deceased children and aborted fetuses and the savior of hell-beings. His statues are a common sight, especially by roadsides and in graveyards.
- Kangiten, god (deva) of bliss.
- Kannon (観音), a Bodhisattva associated with compassion. Commonly known in English as the "Goddess of Mercy."
- Yakushi Nyorai (薬師如来), a Buddha known for healing and medicine.

== Seven Lucky Gods ==
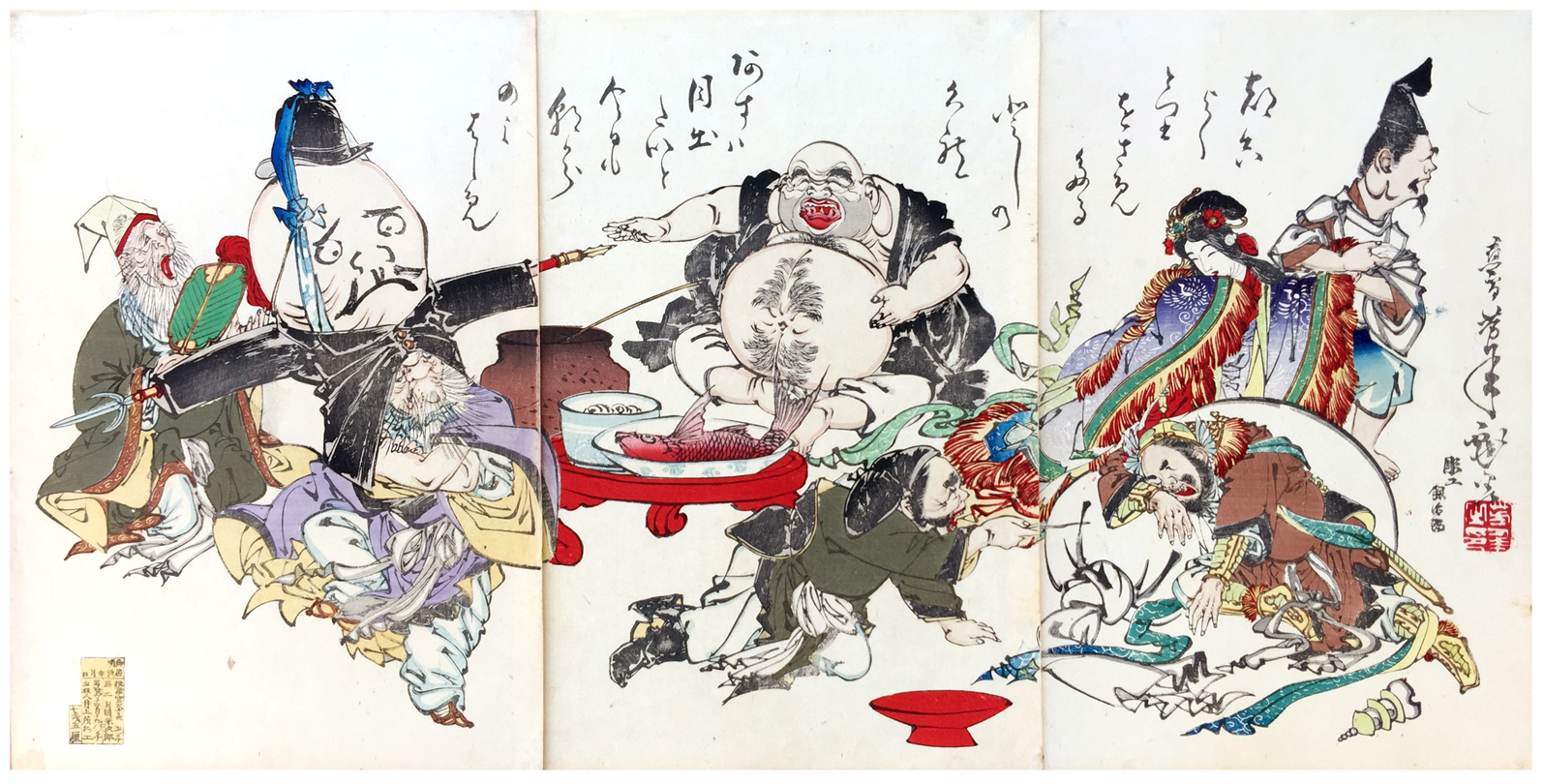
The Seven Lucky Gods (by Yoshitoshi)

The Seven Lucky Gods (七福神, Shichi Fukujin) are:

- Benzaiten (弁才天 or 弁財天) Also known as Benten or Benzaitennyo, she is the goddess of everything that flows: words (and knowledge, by extension), speech, eloquence, and music. Said to be the third daughter of the dragon-king of Munetsuchi, over the course of years, she has gone from being a protective deity of Japan to one who bestows good fortune upon the state and its people. She was derived from Saraswati, the equivalent Hindu goddess.
- Bishamonten (毘沙門天) Also called Bishamon or Tamonten, he is the god of fortunate warriors and guards, as well as the punisher of criminals. Said to live halfway down the side of Mount Sumeru, the small pagoda he carries symbolizes the divine treasure house that he both guards and gives away its contents. Bishamonten is the Japanese equivalent of the Indian Kubera and the Buddhist Vaishravana.
- Daikokuten (大黒天) Often shortened to simply Daikoku, he is variously considered to be the god of wealth (more specifically, the harvest), or of the household (particularly the kitchen). He is recognized by his wide face, smile, and flat black hat. He is often portrayed holding a golden mallet, seated on bales of rice, with mice nearby (which signify plentiful food). He was derived from Mahākāla, the buddhist version of the Hindu deity Shiva.
- Ebisu (恵比須, 恵比寿, 夷 or 戎) The sole member of the gods believed to have originated in Japan, he was originally known as Hiruko (蛭子), the first child of Izanagi and Izanami. Said to be born without bones, he eventually overcame his handicaps to become the mirthful and auspicious Ebisu (hence one of his titles, "The Laughing God"). He is often depicted holding a rod and a large red sea bream or sea bass. Jellyfish are also associated with this god, and the fugu restaurants of Japan will often incorporate Yebisu in their motif.
- Fukurokuju (福禄寿) Often confused with Jurōjin, he is the god of wisdom and longevity and said to be an incarnation of the Southern Polestar. He is a star god accompanied by a crane and a turtle, which are considered to be symbols of longevity, and also sometimes accompanied by a black deer. The sacred book tied to his staff is said to contain the lifespan of every person on Earth.
- Hotei (布袋) Best known in the Western world as the Laughing Buddha, Hotei is likely the most popular of the gods. His image graces many temples, restaurants and amulets. Originally based on a Chinese Chan monk, Hotei has become a deity of contentment and abundance.
- Jurōjin (寿老人) Also known as Gama, he represents longevity. He is often seen with a fan and a staff and accompanied by a black deer.

The goddess Kichijōten (吉祥天), also known as Kisshoutennyo, is sometimes considered to be one of the seven gods, replacing either Jurōjin or Fukurokuju. She embodies happiness, fertility and beauty. Daikoku sometimes manifests as a female known as Daikokunyo (大黒女) or Daikokutennyo (大黒天女). When Kisshoutennyo is counted among the seven Fukujin and Daikoku is regarded in feminine form, all three of the Hindu Tridevi goddesses are represented in the Fukujin.

== See also ==
- Binbōgami
- Dosojin
- Family tree of Japanese deities
- Glossary of Shinto
- Hitorigami
- Kamiumi
- Kunado-no-Kami
- List of legendary creatures from Japan
- Mishaguji
- Munakata Taisha
- Shinigami
- Yakusanoikazuchi: Thunder deities born from Izanami's body
- Yōkai
- Zhong Kui
- Zuijin
