= Takekoma Inari Shrine =

Shinto shrine in Miyagi Prefecture, Japan

Takekoma Inari Jinja 竹駒稲荷神社
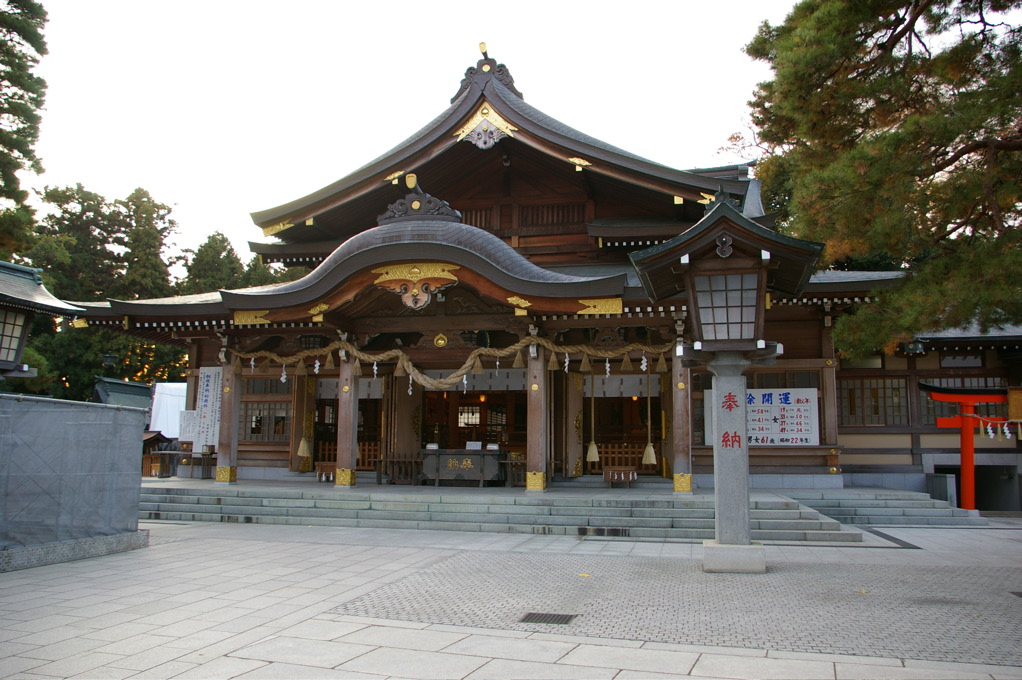
- Haiden of Takekoma Inari Jinja

- Location within Miyagi Prefecture Location within Japan

Religion
- Affiliation: Shinto
- Type: Inari Shrine

Location
- Location: 1-1 Inari-chō, Iwanuma-shi, Miyagi-ken,
- Coordinates: 38°6′18″N 140°51′44.4″E

Architecture
- Established: 842 AD

Website
- www.miyagi-jinjacho.or.jp

The Takekoma Inari Shrine (竹駒稲荷神社) is a Shintō shrine in the city of Iwanuma in Miyagi Prefecture, Japan. It is considered one of the three main shrines dedicated to the kami Inari, and claims to be the second-oldest Inari shrine in Japan. It was also referred to as the Takekoma Myojin (武隈明神)

Inari's traditional festival day is the first horse day (the sixth day) of the second month of the lunisolar calendar; in recent years, the shrine has celebrated the event on a Sunday in February or early March. This festival is estimated to draw a quarter-million attendees.

The shrine is also home to a horsemanship museum.

== Enshrined kami ==
The primary kami of Takekoma Inari Shrine is Ukanomitama (倉稲魂神), traditionally identified as with Inari, and associated with agriculture, especially rice production. Secondary kami include Uke Mochi (保食神), the goddess of food, and Wakumusubi (稚産霊神), the god of the five cereals. There are also several smaller subsidiary shrines within the shrine grounds.

== History ==
The Takekoma Inari Shrine was established in 842 AD, reputedly by Ono no Takamura, the kokushi of Ōshū Province, as a branch of the famous Fushimi Inari Shrine south of Kyoto. The shrine is mentioned by the Heian period poet Nōin during the reign of Emperor Go-Reizei (1045-1068) and during the Sengoku period was awarded an estate by local warlord Date Tanemune. It continued to be supported by the Date clan of Sendai Domain through the end of the Edo period. Following the start of State Shinto in the Meiji period, the shrine was ranked as a Prefectural Shrine under the Modern system of ranked Shinto Shrines.

== Notable structures ==
The Honden of the shrine was a structure built by the 5th daimyō of Sendai Domain, Date Yoshimura, but burned down in a fire on November 21, 1990. It was rebuilt in 1994. Currently, the oldest structure in the shrine is the Zuishinmon two-story gate tower. It was built in 1812 and is a registered Important Cultural Property of Iwanuma City.

== See also ==
- List of Shinto shrines
- Modern system of ranked Shinto Shrines
