= Smyers =

Smyers is a surname. Notable people with the surname include:

- Bert Smyers (1872–1953), American attorney and football player
- Dan Smyers (born 1987), American country musician
- Karen Smyers (born 1961), American triathlete
- Karen Ann Smyers (born 1954), American Jungian analyst
