= Id – Invaded =

Japanese anime television series

- Id: Invaded
- Main visual

ID：INVADED(イド：インヴェイデッド)
- Genre: Murder mystery; Science fiction
- Created by: The Detectives United
- Manga

Id: Invaded #Brake Broken
- Written by: Ōtarō Maijō
- Illustrated by: Yūki Kodama
- Published by: Kadokawa Shoten
- English publisher: NA: Yen Press
- Magazine: Young Ace
- Original run: October 4, 2019 – November 4, 2020
- Volumes: 3
- Anime television series
- Directed by: Ei Aoki
- Produced by: Mitsuhiro Ogata; Tomoyuki Ōwada; Yū Kanemaru; Jōtarō Ishigami; Toyokazu Nakahigashi; Adam Zehner; Yasuo Suda
- Written by: Ōtarō Maijō
- Music by: Atsushi Umebori (U/S); Slavek Kowalewski (U/S)
- Studio: NAZ
- Licensed by: Crunchyroll
- Original network: Tokyo MX, BS11, TVA, KBS, SUN
- Original run: January 5, 2020 – March 22, 2020
- Episodes: 13
- Original net animation

Id: Indeed
- Directed by: Ei Aoki (Note: Credited as Chief Director (総監督)); Atsushi Ikariya
- Written by: Ei Aoki
- Music by: Atsushi Umebori; Slavek Kowalewski
- Studio: NAZ
- Released: January 8, 2021 – March 26, 2021
- Episodes: 12
- icon

Id: Invaded (Note: Japanese: ID：INVADED(イド：インヴェイデッド)) (stylized as I⊃:INVΛ⊃≡⊃) is a Japanese anime television series produced by NAZ, directed by Ei Aoki and written by Ōtarō Maijō. It aired from January to March 2020. A manga sequel by Yūki Kodama was serialized in Kadokawa Shoten's seinen manga magazine Young Ace from October 2019 to November 2020.

== Synopsis ==
The story follows the investigations of Narihisago, a renowned detective now in prison, who is tasked with diving into the id wells of various serial killers. Two years prior to the current events, Narihisago's daughter Muku was brutally murdered by a serial killer, leading Narihisago's wife to commit suicide. These deaths prompted him to hunt down and murder the killer, earning him his prison sentence. He is still depressed and haunted by his wife and daughter's deaths, but also uses this as motivation to take his work seriously and help stop serial killers; however, as a result of the deaths of his family, he bears a grudge against all serial killers, which occasionally manifests as an uncontrollable urge to kill. Despite this, however, it is shown that the majority of Narihisago's colleagues have great respect for his work. Rookie field analyst Hondomachi becomes an important character during the series after having a brush with death in a serial killer case.

Events take place in a world where investigators have the power to tap into a killer's unconscious and see fragmented parts of their psyche. This is referred to as an "id well", a mental plane that can be digitally entered to collect clues regarding a killer's victims, crime scenes, and motives. As one traverses through an id well, their sights and actions appear as digital projections in the real world for investigators to analyze in real-time. Since a person's unconscious thoughts are rarely organized, everything within an id, including people and locations will appear in a fractured or symbolic state and can only be temporarily put together by someone investigating the id well. Additionally, id wells can only be entered by victims or other killers. While it is possible to get hurt or die in an id well, the well traveler can simply be removed and re-injected into the well again, though all previous memories from their time in there will be lost.

Field analysts assist well investigators using a tool called "Wakumusubi ", a sort of handheld radar gun that detects and collects delicate "cognition particles", given off by a person's intent to kill. The scanner can be programmed to collect the killing intent of a specific criminal and add that information to their id well. This helps flesh out the killer's well for a more thorough investigation. Additionally, the memories of victims encountered in id wells can also add important information to the environment.

== Characters ==
Akihito Narihisago (鳴瓢 秋人, Narihisago Akihito)
Voiced by: Kenjiro Tsuda (Japanese); Jessie James Grelle (Note: Credited as Josh Grelle; Grelle came out as transgender and changed their name in 2023.) (English)
A renowned detective assisting in investigating and analyzing serial killer id wells. His real name is Akihito Narihisago, but during his time in id wells he is referred to as the brilliant detective Sakaido (酒井戸, Sakaido). In the past he was once a happy family man with a daughter named Muku. Two years prior to the current events Muku was murdered by a serial killer nicknamed the Challenger, followed by Narihisago's wife committing suicide out of grief, leading Narihisago to kill the Challenger out of revenge. He is sentenced to prison for this, and is placed in the maximum security section with other killers. Feeling guilty for not being able to protect Muku, her death continues to haunt Narihisago and gives him nightmares. However, having killed someone, he is now able to enter id wells and retrieve information in serial killer cases. He is shown to bear a grudge against all serial killers, and on occasion uses the knowledge gleaned from their id wells to cause them to commit suicide in prison, something that creates friction between him and the rest of the investigation team.
Funetaro Momoki (百貴 船太郎, Momoki Funetarō)
Voiced by: Yoshimasa Hosoya (Japanese); Christopher Wehkamp (English)
Head inspector of the investigation unit, and a good friend of Narihisago. He worked with Narihisago as a police officer prior to Narihisago's imprisonment. While he has strong trust in Sakaido's detective skills, he worries for Narihisago's mental health. He rescued the last victim in the Challenger case, Kiki Atsukai, but is puzzled by her disappearance and has secretly tried to investigate her vanishing.
Tamotsu Fukuda (富久田 保津, Fukuda Tamotsu)
Voiced by: Ryōta Takeuchi (Japanese); Justin Cook (English)
A notorious serial killer also known as the "Perforator" for his gruesome style of murdering victims using a drill. Fukuda has arithmomania, and drilled a hole in his head to try to block out his thoughts prior to becoming a serial killer. He is also scarred on the right side of his face. It is stated that parts of his brain were impacted by the drill procedure, affecting some of his cognitive functions. He is shown to be a very calculating psychopath with a high IQ, and enjoys taunting Narihisago. He is also briefly considered as Sakaido's substitute for id well investigations, whereupon he is named Anaido (穴井戸, Anaido). While ultimately not chosen as a replacement, Anaido and Sakaido do work together as Well detectives in the eighth episode of the series. Unlike other serial killers, Fukuda is the only killer who did not murder Kiki Asukai prior to becoming a serial killer.
Koharu Hondomachi (本堂町 小春, Hondomachi Koharu)
Voiced by: M.A.O (Japanese); Monica Rial (English)
A 23-year-old rookie field analyst working under Matsuoka at the beginning of the series. She almost becomes a victim of the Perforator after he kidnaps her, but uses this to her team's advantage. She purposely attempts to commit suicide via the Perforator's drill, generating an id well that ultimately leads to his capture. Hondomachi recovers from the incident, but is left with a hole in her head. Upon killing someone in self-defense during the Gravedigger case, she is recommended by Matsuoka to become an id well investigator. During her time in id wells, she is known as Detective Miyo Hijiriido (聖井戸 御代, Hijiriido Miyo). Hondomachi and Fukuda's relationship becomes one of mutual respect over the course of the series, despite Fukuda's former attempt to kill her.
Kaeru (カエル, Kaeru)
Voiced by: Yume Miyamoto (Japanese); Sarah Wiedenheft (English)
A mysterious dead girl whose body appears at the start of every id well investigation. The method of her murder varies depending on the id well of the serial killer being investigated, but it helps Sakaido discover clues about the real killer's murder methods or motives. Oftentimes Kaeru's body is a placeholder for a serial killer's victims in the event that the killer does not remember details of what their victim looks like. Later in the series, Kaeru is revealed to be Kiki Asukai (飛鳥井 木記, Asukai Kiki), the last victim from the Challenger case, who disappeared after she was rescued. Asukai is a telepath who can inadvertently project her thoughts, memories and dreams into the minds of other people and occasionally be premonitory with her dreams. Because of her power, she had intense dreams of being brutally murdered every night by different serial killers, starting with John Walker, who invited other serial killers into her dreams. As her power began to grow out of control and draw people around her into comas, she was kidnapped by John Walker to empower the Mizuhanome system. Kiki's id well is accessible from the id wells of those who used to interact with her, in form of a cockpit chair.
John Walker (ジョン・ウォーカー, Jon Uōkā)
The main antagonist. A mysterious, distorted man who has appeared in the id wells of multiple serial killers, but never speaks. He wears a red frock coat, a gold top hat, brown boots, and a black bow tie. Togo deduces he somehow fuels the serial killer's desire to kill, and Chief Hayaseura deduces he may be a serial killer creator encouraging others to murder. His appearances in unconsciouses have fueled at least five people to become serial killers, leading to at least 44 murders. In the Well world, he appears as the arrogant detective Uraido (裏井戸, Uraido), but is also able to enter id wells without this persona, aware of his own identity. He is depicted as having a God complex and feels no regret for creating serial killers, brushing it off as a minor issue in his overarching plan.

=== Kura Department ===
Takuhiko Hayaseura (早瀬浦 宅彦, Hayaseura Takuhiko)
Voiced by: Manabu Muraji (Japanese); Charles Campbell (English)
An elderly man who is the head chief of the investigation unit, and helped create the Kura Well system.
Nishio Shirakoma (白駒 二四男, Shirakoma Nishio)
Voiced by: Nobuo Tobita (Japanese); Jerry Jewell (English)
The inventor of Mizuhanome System. During Narihisago's time in Kiki's id well, it is shown that Nishio was a doctor and independent researcher at Kiki's hospital, and used her as a test subject to study how to enter one's unconscious via dreams. Nishio and John Walker kidnapped Kiki to create the Kura Well and Mizuhanome systems.
Sarina Togo (東郷 紗利奈, Togo Sharina)
Voiced by: Sarah Emi Bridcutt (Japanese); Kimberly Grace (English)
Assistant director and general analyst to Momoki, leading the investigation team when he is unavailable. She is implied to have a romantic relationship with Momoki.
Sennosuke Shiratake (白岳 仙之介, Shiratake Sennosuke)
Voiced by: Takashi Kondō (Japanese); Joe Cucinotti (English)
A member of Inspector Momoki's team who digitally analyzes the locations within the id wells. He is shown to have somewhat of a skeptic personality.
Masamune Habutae (羽二重 正宗, Habutae Masamune)
Voiced by: Shuuhei Iwase (Japanese); Stephen Fu (English)
A member of Inspector Momoki's team who analyzes people appearing in id wells. He shows slight disdain for having to work with a criminal like Narihisago.
Kazuo Wakashika (若鹿 一雄, Wakashika Kazuo)
Voiced by: Junya Enoki (Japanese); Kyle Phillips (English)
An important member of Inspector Momoki's team who makes deductions about scenes and events as they are being investigated in the id well.
Shirou Kokufu (国府 司郎, Kokufu Shirō)
Voiced by: Wataru Katoh (Japanese); Travis Mullenix (English)
An assistant to Inspector Momoki who primarily helps Togo with analysis. At the end of the series, he is given the position of Acting Chief Director.
Tsukimaru Nishimura (西村 月丸, Nishimura Tsukimaru)
Voiced by: Fukushi Ochiai (Japanese); Daman Mills (English)
Head of the Kura department assisting police at crime scenes under investigation. He is murdered during the Gravedigger case when he enters a rigged crime scene with his team.
Kokuryu Matsuoka (松岡 黒龍, Matsuoka Kokuryū)
Voiced by: Rintarō Nishi (Japanese); Jarrod Greene (English)
The by-the-book head field analyst for the investigation team, and the higher-up partner of Hondomachi. He worked with Narihisago in the past when they were both detectives, but was never very fond of him. Following Hondomachi's actions during the Gravedigger case, Matsuoka recommends her for the Wellside department to become an id well investigator. However, he privately discloses to Hondomachi that he only did so because he realized Hondomachi might have a penchant for dangerous situations, which he does not consider normal.

=== Others ===
Muku Narihisago (鳴瓢 椋, Narihisago Muku)
Voiced by: Miyuri Shimabukuro (Japanese); Tia Ballard (English)
Narihisago's teen daughter, brutally murdered by the Challenger serial killer prior to the start of the series. The gruesomeness of her murder drove her mother to commit suicide and fueled Narihisago to murder the Challenger and earn his prison sentence.
Ayako Narihisago (鳴瓢 綾子, Narihisago Ayako)
Voiced by: Aya Endō (Japanese); Alex Moore (English)
Narihisago's deceased wife and the mother of Muku. A gentle and kind woman, she was unable to handle the shock and grief from Muku's murder. She commits suicide prior to the start of the series by slitting her wrists in the bathtub.
Denshin Katsuyama (勝山伝心, Katsuyama Denshin)
Voiced by: Tomokazu Sugita (Japanese); Brian Mathis (English)
A serial killer known as the "Challenger", responsible for the murder of Narihisago's daughter Muku. He was an extremely strong and wealthy man. He brutally murdered his victims by forcing them into hardcore wrestling matches, originally choosing strong opponents, but quickly getting a thrill from murdering weak and helpless ones. Kiki believes the Challenger was both a sadist and a masochist, as he enjoyed both hurting people as well as being hit back. He mainly murdered his victims in a wrestling arena built in his basement, but occasionally committed his murders outside of his home, as in the case of Muku. His last attempted victim was Kiki Asukai, who was rescued by Momoki. Prior to the start of the series, Narihisago guns down the Challenger after Muku is murdered, leading to Narihisago's prison sentence.
Nahoshi Inami (井波 七星, Inami Nahoshi)
Voiced by: Ayane Sakura (Japanese); Bryn Apprill (English)
A cold-hearted serial killer known as the "Gravedigger" for her style of burying victims alive and live-streaming their deaths for her sadistic viewing pleasure. Though she personally did not kill anyone, she perpetrates the Gravedigger murders by having her childhood crush and former Perforator victim Haruka Kazuta carry out the murders on her behalf. When Inami was 14, her mother committed suicide by jumping in front of a train with Inami on board. This incident warped Inami's psyche and made her become fascinated with death. She thinks Hondomachi is cute, but is also wildly jealous of her for sharing a kiss with Kazuta. Inami is arrested and taken into custody by Hondomachi and Matsuoka after a failed ambush to kill them. Near the end of the series, she is murdered in an id Well by John Walker.

== Media ==
=== Anime ===
On July 4, 2019, Kadokawa announced a new original anime television series directed by Ei Aoki and written by novelist Ōtarō Maijō. Atsushi Ikariya designed the characters, while Atsushi Umebori and Slavek Kowalewski composed the series' music under the artist collective U/S. NAZ animated the series. The series aired from January 5 to March 22, 2020, on Tokyo MX, BS11, TVA, KBS, and SUN, with the first episode listed as a one-hour special. Sou performed the opening theme song "Mister Fixer" (ミスターフィクサー), while Miyavi performed the ending theme song "Other Side". His songs "UP", "Samurai 45", and "Butterfly" were also included in the first, fourth, twelfth, and thirteenth episodes, respectively (with "UP" being used again as the ending credit in episode thirteen). The anime also contains several insert songs throughout the series, including "Eternal Rail" from Kenmochi Hidefumi of Wednesday Campanella in the sixth episode, a song from Kazuya Nagami in the ninth episode, and the song "Memories of Love" composed by Hiroshi Suenami & Soundbreakers and sang by Liz Sarria II in the tenth episode.

The first two episodes were given special preview screenings on December 15, 2019, on Funimation, Hulu, and Wakanim, and on December 16, 2019, on AnimeLab due to time differences. Funimation licensed the series for a SimulDub. It ran for 13 episodes.

==== Episodes ====
No.	Title (Note: All English titles are taken from Funimation.)	Original release date
1	"Jigsawed"; Transliteration: "Jigusawedo Barabara no Sekai" (Japanese: JIGSAWED バラバラの世界)	January 5, 2020 (Note: The first two episodes were given preview screenings by Funimation on December 15, 2019.)
Sakaido awakens in the id well of the Perforator serial killer, notorious for killing his victims by drilling a hole into their heads. Things take a turn for the worse when Hondomachi is kidnapped by the Perforator.
2	"Jigsawed II"; Transliteration: "Jigusawedo Tsū Barabara no Sekai" (Japanese: JIGSAWED II バラバラの世界)	January 5, 2020
Sakaido comes across a strange person in the Perforator's id well known as John Walker, but knocks him out before he says anything. Walker is a mysterious man who came in contact with several serial killers prior to their killing sprees. Togo and Hayaseura deduce Walker might be a serial killer creator, entering the minds of individuals and convincing them to kill. Meanwhile, Hondomachi awakens strapped to a table in the Perforator's lair. She purposely has the Perforator drill into her head to create a new id well for Sakaido to investigate, leading to the Perforator's capture and Hondomachi's rescue.
3	"Sniped"; Transliteration: "Sunaipudo Taki no Sekai" (Japanese: SNIPED 滝の世界)	January 12, 2020
While Hondomachi recovers from the incidents of the previous episode, the rest of the team finds themselves pitted against the Pyrotechnician serial killer, who uses fireworks as a distraction to snipe innocent bystanders. The killer is discovered to be a war veteran who became fascinated with mass death. The Pyrotechnician is successfully arrested and placed in a cell across from Narihisago. Narihisago analyzes the Pyrotechnician's motives and weaknesses and coldly drives him to commit suicide, while the Perforator listens from his cell nearby.
4	"Extended"; Transliteration: "Ekutendedido Moesakaru Biru no Sekai" (Japanese: EXTENDED 燃えさかるビルの世界)	January 19, 2020
Following the suicide of the Pyrotechnician, Narihisago is placed in solitary confinement and members of the investigation team feel on edge over his actions. However, an attempt to find a replacement detective proves unsuccessful, and the team is forced to work with Narihisago again. The target is the Gravedigger serial killer, who buries their victims alive and livestreams their dying process. Sakaido discovers the killer is a depressed and lonely man from the victim's neighborhood, but Kazuo realizes he is a copycat killer and the real serial killer remains at large. The police capture the copycat killer, but arrive too late to save the victim. Back in prison, Momoki questions Narihisago about his killing urges, but reassures that they are still friends. The episode ends with Hondomachi being suddenly kissed at the scene of the copycat Gravedigger's crime scene by Haruka Kazuta, a missing man who was a victim of the Perforator killer.
5	"Fallen"; Transliteration: "Fōren Ochiru Sekai" (Japanese: FALLEN 落ちる世界)	January 26, 2020
Kazuta runs away after kissing Hondomachi, who quickly reports the event to Matsuoka. She guesses Kazuta might be the actual Gravedigger killer and that he wanted to kill Hondomachi, but his urges to kiss and kill might have been interchanged in his unconscious after the Perforator drilled a hole in his head. She further infers that a craving of love might be what drives Kazuta to kill. Sakaido dives into Kazuta's id well, where his findings help the investigation team confirm Kazuta as the Gravedigger, allowing Officer Nishimura and his team to raid Kazuta's home for his arrest. However they realize too late that Kazuta's home is rigged with a gas explosion, killing them and destroying the crime scene. The real Gravedigger mastermind is revealed to be Kazuta's former classmate Nahoshi Inami, a sadist with a crush on Kazuta who enjoys seeing fresh wounds and watching people die. The episode ends with Hondomachi holding Inami at gunpoint, not knowing Kazuta was hiding nearby with a knife.
6	"Circled"; Transliteration: "Sākurudo Enkan no Sekai" (Japanese: CIRCLED 円環の世界)	February 2, 2020
Kazuta attacks Hondomachi and Matsuoka, but only Matsuoka is injured. Hondomachi kills Kazuta after a brief struggle, and Inami is arrested. Shortly after these events, the investigation team is shown attending Nishimura's funeral. They contemplate the identity and mind infiltration methods of John Walker. Kazuo deduces Walker might be using some form of the special cockpit chairs used to enter id wells, and remembers that the inventor of the Mizuhanome system is missing. He also ponders with Masamune if Walker might be someone they know. Togo decides to use her position to try and find more information about the Mizuhanome. In the aftermath of the Gravedigger case, the forensic team discovers mics and cameras in the houses of the Perforator, the Gravedigger, and the Challenger, leading them to believe John Walker was keeping tabs on all of his serial killer protégés. Sakaido enters Inami's id well to investigate her motives, and John Walker is briefly seen. In the real world, Matsuoka recommends Hondomachi to be an id well detective, but reveals to her in private that he only did so because he is uncomfortable with her penchant for violence.
7	"Thunderbolted"; Transliteration: "Sandāborutido Kaminari no Sekai" (Japanese: THUNDERBOLTED 雷の世界)	February 9, 2020
The forensic team gathers cognition particles from the Challenger and Narihisago, with Hondomachi diving into Narihisago's id well to discover if he had contact with John Walker. Although Walker is not found, Hondomachi stumbles upon an active Mizuhanome cockpit linked to Kiki Asukai, the last victim of the Challenger. Momoki discloses that he saved Kiki, but has not seen her since the Challenger investigation. Before she can be extracted, Hondomachi dives into Kiki's id well while still in Narihisago's well. The investigation team is waylaid by an arrest warrant for Momoki, who has been framed as John Walker. The police found the decayed remains of the Mizuhanome inventor in Momoki's yard, and found that the mics and cameras in the homes of serial killers all linked back to Momoki's computer. Narihisago is irate upon hearing these accusations, and begs Togo to allow him to dive into Momoki's id well to clear his friend's name.
8	"Desertified"; Transliteration: "Dezāchifuaido Suna no Sekai" (Japanese: DESERTIFIED 砂の世界)	February 16, 2020
While Momoki is interrogated by the police, Togo leads a rescue mission to extract Hondomachi from Kiki Asukai's id well. Since Kiki's Well only exists within the minds of those who interacted with her, Togo tasks Narihisago and Fukuda to dive into Momoki's id well to find a copy of Kiki's Well. Momoki's Well is presented as an uninhabited Arabian Desert, prompting Sakaido and Anaido to rely on each other for survival. They come across a rotting corpse in quicksand, and the buried id well of Kiki. Sakaido decides to enter the id well for ten minutes, after which Anaido will extract him. In the real world, upon discovering that his id well was entered, Momoki yells for the detectives to be extracted because they are falling for a trap.
9	"Inside-Outed"	February 23, 2020
In Kiki's Well, Narihisago awakens back to the day Muku was murdered, with his real-life knowledge and memories of the case still intact. After a brutal scuffle leaving him seriously injured, Narihisago subdues the Challenger and has Momoki arrest him to prevent Muku's murder. Momoki also rescues Kiki Asukai from the Challenger's basement, who Narihisago recognizes to be Kaeru. Kiki and Narihisago are both taken to the hospital, where Narihisago finds he is somehow able to enter Kiki's dreams and interact with her. Kiki reveals she is being brutally murdered in her dreams every night by real-life serial killers. John Walker was the first to enter her dreams, after which he began inviting other serial killers to take turns killing her each night. As an example, a serial killer known as The Face-lifter enters Kiki's dream to murder her, but Narihisago knocks him out. Kiki deduces that the killers get a thrill for murder during these dreams, driving them to kill in real life. Narihisago promises to end Kiki's suffering. The end of the episode shows the body of The Face-lifter, driven to suicide by Narihisago.
10	"Inside-Outed II"	March 1, 2020
Two years have passed within Kiki's id well, with Narihisago spending this time leading three other serial killers to commit suicide and trying to investigate John Walker. While visiting the hospital one day, Narihisago and Momoki find Kiki's mind being researched by Nishio Shirakoma, the creator of the Mizuhanome System, however Narihisago does not recognize him. Kiki's health has deteriorated over time, and she theorizes her body will disintegrate and fuse with reality, warping the structure of the world. She begs Narihisago to kill her, but he strongly refuses and stops visiting her. Kiki mysteriously disappears from the hospital a few months later. Narihisago goes to kill off the Perforator, but instead runs into Hondomachi. This meeting between two different Well divers creates a rift, and Kiki's Well world slowly begins to dissolve. Additionally, Sakaido's ten minutes in the Well end, and Anaido initiates his extraction. Before he leaves, Narihisago gives Hondomachi a notebook of his findings to continue investigating John Walker. Back in Momoki's Well, Sakaido realizes Anaido has tampered with evidence on Kaeru's body, purposely diverting the investigation. Anaido/Fukuda reveals he is immune to amnesia due to his drill injury and has remembered the real world this whole time, intentionally sidetracking the investigation team. He reveals the corpse in the quicksand belongs to Narihisago, and that they are actually in Narihisago's Well, not Momoki's. By making Sakaido remember his real-world identity, Narihisago's mind creates a storm to protect his conscious from his unconscious. The episode ends with Narihisago seeing an image of John Walker in the storm.
11	"Stormed"	March 8, 2020
As the Well Storm rages on, Narihisago realizes John Walker attempted to manipulate him into becoming a serial killer. Fukuda tests this by encouraging Narihisago to murder him, but Narihisago refuses, proving his ethics are still intact. He realizes Fukuda is suicidal because he has uncontrollable arithmomania. Narihisago convinces Fukuda to use his arithmomania to track down the cockpit Hondomachi entered, and the two of them work to extract her. In the real world, the investigation team and Matsuoka find that Narihisago's cognitive particles were planted in Momoki's apartment by an outsider, allowing Narihisago's Well to be entered instead of Momoki's. Meanwhile, still in Kiki Asukai's id well, Hondomachi uses Narihisago's notes and Fukuda's help to unveil Chief Hayaseura as John Walker. Narihisago and Fukuda extract Hondomachi from Kiki's Well, and all three of them are then extracted from Narihisago's Well by the investigation team. As Togo announces a warrant for Hayaseura's arrest, Hayaseura cuts the Mizuhanome power and leaves the team in the dark. The episode ends with Hayaseura entering a secret chamber to awaken the suspended body of Kiki.
12	"Channeled"	March 15, 2020
Chief Hayaseura/John Walker releases Kiki in the police department building. Everyone she comes in contact with is put in a deep sleep, including the investigation team, with their minds transporting into one of the many serial killer id wells seen in the previous episodes. Chief Hayaseura enters the Kura cockpit room containing Narihisago, Hondomachi, and Fukuda. He admits he created the Kura system to catch serial killers and has been very pleased with the results, brushing off his creation of serial killers as a minor side effect of his greater cause. His goal is to turn all of Kura into a giant Mizuhanome to allow for larger-scale investigations. He then enters a Kura cockpit and commits suicide, allowing his mind to continue living and working in the Well world. Narihisago and Hondomachi enter the other cockpits to go after him, while Fukuda falls into a deep sleep invoked by Kiki's presence. After creating multiple serial killer Wells and entering and exiting Kiki's mind so much, Walker now shares much of Kiki's unconscious, and is able to freely teleport to different Wells Kiki has been a part of. Narihisago and Hondomachi chase Walker through multiple id wells. Walker reminds Hondomachi of her real identity to trap her in a Well storm, but she is rescued by Fukuda, who used his arithmomania to track her down. However Fukuda sacrifices his life to protect Hondomachi from Inami, who tracked down Hondomachi to exact revenge for the death of Kazuta. Inami leaves to another Well to see Kazuta, but is murdered by John Walker. Meanwhile, Momoki and Matsuoka surveil Kiki from outside the department building. They obtain Nishio's prototype Mizuhanome helmet, and the episode ends with Momoki putting on protective gear as he prepares to approach Kiki.
13	"Channeled II"	March 22, 2020
Narihisago and Hondomachi attempt to kill John Walker, but find he cannot be killed due to being a permanent part of Kiki's Well. They decide to lead him into the id Well from the first episode made from Fukuda's cognizant particles, and trick Walker into entering a Kura cockpit secretly brought in by Fukuda before his death. This new cockpit transfers Walker's mind to the scene in the previous episode right before he committed suicide, with Narihisago successfully apprehending him in that timeline. With Walker dead in the real world and apprehended in the Well world, he is no longer a threat. In the real world, Momoki reaches Kiki and offers to save her. Kiki declines, realizing she is too big of a threat to exist outside of the Mizuhanome, especially since she is beginning to share thoughts and dreams with others across the world. She agrees to re-enter the Mizuhanome, with Momoki promising to find a way to save her. The environment returns to normal after she is contained and everyone wakes up, except for people like Fukuda who died in the Well world. Narihisago and Hondomachi are extracted from the Kiki's Well. An epilogue states Chief Hayaseura's death was reported as a suicide, and all of the events surrounding Kiki and the Mizuhanome were covered up by the Kura Department. The ending scene shows Narihisago and Hondomachi working together as Wellside detectives, continuing to enter id Wells and catching killers.

=== Manga ===
A manga sequel by Yūki Kodama, titled ID: Invaded #Brake Broken, was serialized in Kadokawa's Young Ace magazine from October 4, 2019, to November 4, 2020, and collected into three volumes. Yen Press licensed the manga for a North American release.

==== Volumes ====
No.	Original release date	Original ISBN	English release date	English ISBN
1	January 10, 2020	978-4-04-109110-4	February 23, 2021	978-1-97-531773-7
2	July 3, 2020	978-4-04-109746-5	August 10, 2021	978-1-97-532406-3
3	December 4, 2020	978-4-04-109747-2	November 23, 2021	978-1-97-533705-6

== Reception ==
The Encyclopedia of Science Fiction described Id: Invaded as an enjoyable and interesting science fiction anime despite its convoluted and sometimes incoherent plotting. It highlighted the series's exploration of perception, psychology and the manipulation of mental landscapes through technology resembling dream hacking, comparing its blurring of reality and illusion to the work of Philip K. Dick. However, the encyclopedia criticized the narrative's dependence on implausible premises, particularly the notion that serial killers leave behind detectable "cognition particles" that enable investigators to enter their minds. It also opined that the large number of interconnected plot developments contributed to the story's confusion. Nevertheless, it concluded that the series had considerable merits despite these weaknesses.

== See also ==
- Blood Lad, another manga series by the same illustrator as the manga sequel
- Hamatora, another manga series with the art by the same illustrator as the manga sequel
- Psycho-Pass, another anime series with a similar premise
