= Ōmikami =

Ōmikami may refer to:

- Amaterasu, or Amaterasu-ōmikami, Shinto sun goddess
- Toyouke-Ōmikami, Shinto goddess of agriculture and industry
