= Inari Ōkami =

One of the principal kami of Shinto

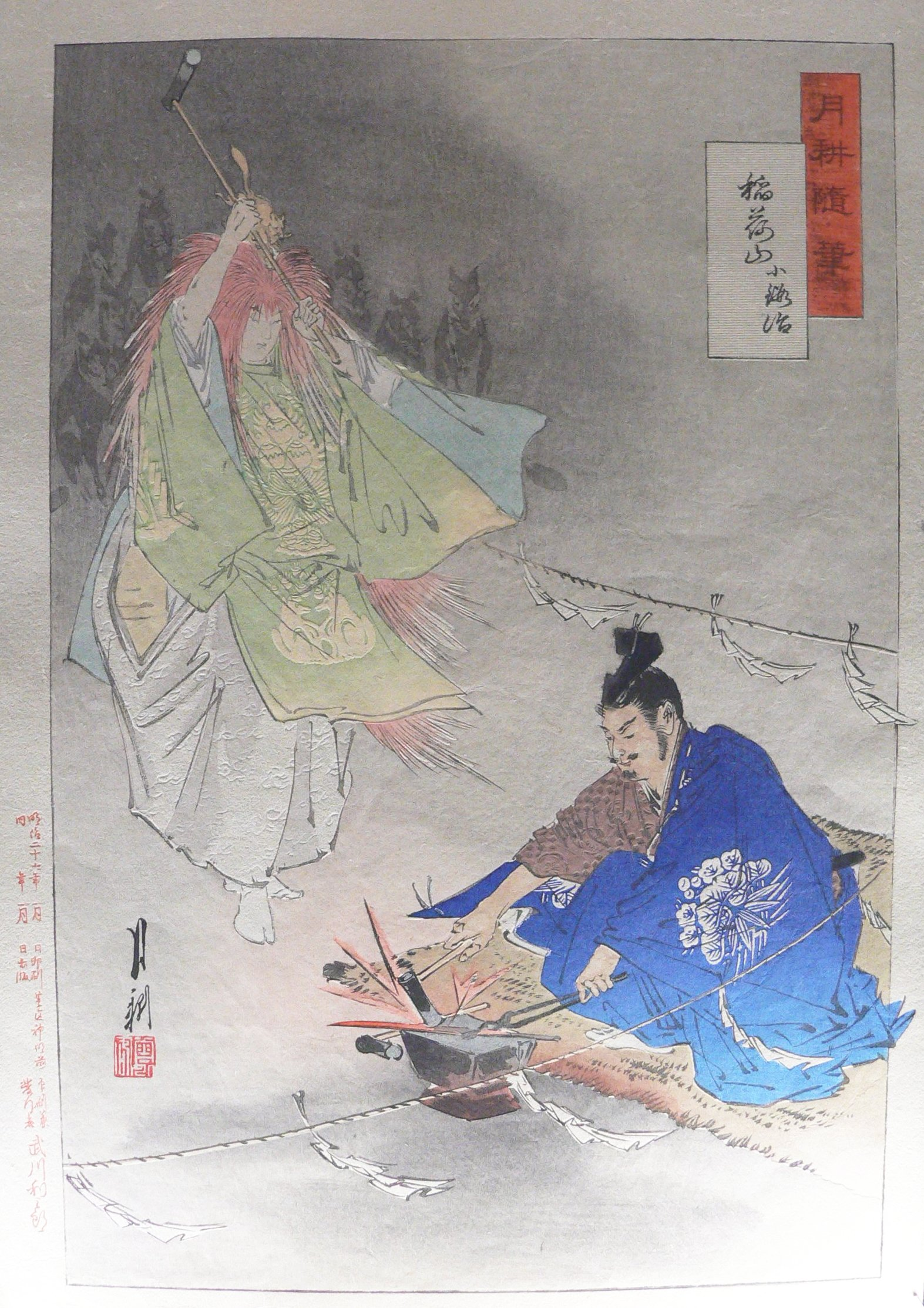
Inari and their fox spirits help the blacksmith Munechika forge the blade kogitsune-maru (Little Fox) in the late 10th century. This legend is the subject of the noh drama Sanjo Kokaji.

Inari Ōkami (Japanese: 稲荷大神), also called Ō-Inari (大稲荷), is the Japanese kami of foxes, fertility, rice, tea, sake, agriculture and industry, and general prosperity and worldly success, and is one of the principal kami of Shinto. The name Inari can be literally translated into "rice-bearer". In earlier Japan, Inari was also the patron of swordsmiths and merchants. With common depictions as both male and female, Inari is sometimes seen as a collective of three or five individual kami. Inari appears to have been worshipped since the founding of a shrine at Inari Mountain in 711 CE, although some scholars believe that worship started in the late 5th century.

By the 16th century, Inari had become the patron of blacksmiths and the protector of warriors, and worship of Inari spread across Japan in the Edo period. Inari is a popular figure in both Shinto and Buddhist beliefs in Japan. More than one-third (40,000) of the Shinto shrines in Japan are dedicated to Inari. Modern corporations, such as cosmetic company Shiseido, continue to revere Inari as a patron kami, with shrines atop their corporate headquarters.

Inari's foxes, or kitsune, are pure white and act as their messengers but it is more likely that in ancient times the fox itself was revered as the kami of rice.

According to myth, Inari, as a megami (female Kami), was said to have come to Japan at the time of its creation amidst a harsh famine that struck the land. "She [Inari] descended from Heaven riding on a white fox, and in her hand she carried sheaves of cereal or grain. Ine, the word now used for rice, is the name for this cereal. What she carried was not rice but some cereal that grows in swamps. According to legend, in the ancient times Japan was water and swamp land."

Foxes running wild in rice-fields might have inspired the idea of Inari as they seemed to inspect the crops. To show their gratitude the farmers offered red rice and fried bean curd to the foxes.

== Description ==
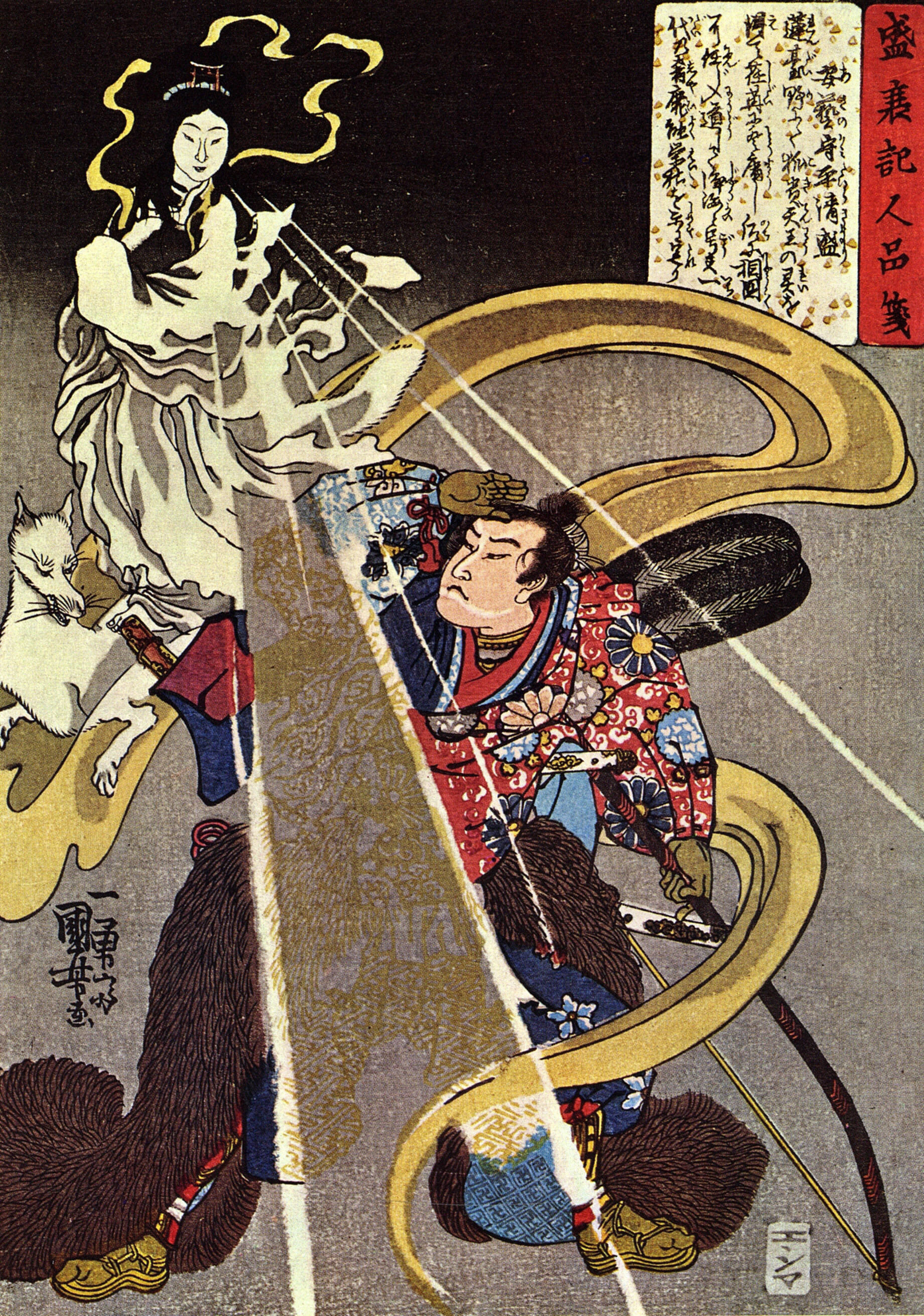
Inari appears to a warrior. This portrayal of Inari shows the influence of Dakiniten concepts from Buddhism.

Inari has been depicted both as female and as male. The most popular representations of Inari, according to scholar Karen Ann Smyers, are a young female food megami and an old man carrying grains of rice. Historically, Inari started off as female until the rise of the Buddhist controlled government in Japan. At the time, many female high-power deities were changed to male, Inari included. The separation of Buddhism and Shinto began in the late 19th century under the Meiji regime as one of the early reforms.

Some did not know whether to refer to Inari as male or female, so they left it up to each person. Because of her close association with kitsune, Inari is often believed to be a fox; though this belief is widespread, both Shinto and Buddhist priests discourage it. Inari also appears in the form of a snake or dragon, and one folktale has Inari appear to a wicked man in the shape of a monstrous spider as a way of teaching him a lesson.

Inari is sometimes identified with other mythological figures. Some scholars suggest that Inari is the figure known in classical Japanese mythology as the Shinto female deity Uka-no-Mitama (or possibly Uke Mochi); others suggest Inari is the same figure as the Shinto female deity, Toyouke. Some take Inari to be identical to any grain kami.

Inari's female aspect is often identified or conflated with Dakiniten, a Buddhist deity who is a Japanese transformation of the Indian dakini, or with Benzaiten of the Seven Lucky Gods. Dakiniten is portrayed as a female or androgynous bodhisattva riding a flying white fox. Inari's association with Buddhism may have begun in the 8th century, when Shingon Buddhist monk and founder, Kūkai, took over administration of the temple of Tōji, and chose Inari as a protector of the temple. Thus, Inari is still closely associated with Shingon Buddhism to this day.

Inari is often venerated as a collective of three deities (Inari sanza); since the Kamakura period, this number has sometimes increased to five kami (Inari goza). However, the identification of these kami has varied over time. According to records of Fushimi Inari, the oldest and perhaps most prominent Inari shrine, these kami have included Izanagi, Izanami, Ninigi, and Wakumusubi, in addition to the food deities previously mentioned.

The five kami today identified with Inari at Fushimi Inari are Ukanomitama, Sarutahiko, Omiyanome, Tanaka, and Shi. At Takekoma Inari, the second-oldest Inari shrine in Japan, the three enshrined deities are Ukanomitama, Ukemochi, and Wakumusubi. According to the Nijūni shaki, the three kami are Ōmiyame no mikoto (water) Ukanomitama no mikoto (grain) and Sarutahiko no mikami (land). He is also "associated" with or thought to be Ukemochi. He is also sometimes thought to be the son of Susanoo named Uka no Mitama no Kami.

The fox, magical gems, scrolls with divine writings, and the wish-fulfilling jewel are prominent symbols of Inari. Other common elements in depictions of Inari, and sometimes of their kitsune, include a sickle, a sheaf or sack of rice, and a sword. Another belonging was their whip—although they were hardly known to use it, it was a powerful weapon that was used to burn people's crops of rice.

Inari is associated with the numbers 2 and 3, numbers with either one at the beginning, including and especially multiples of them able to be evenly divided by powers of 10, and multiples of 2 and 3.

They are also associated with brothels, entertainers, swords and swordsmiths, and food and meals in general besides rice.

== History ==
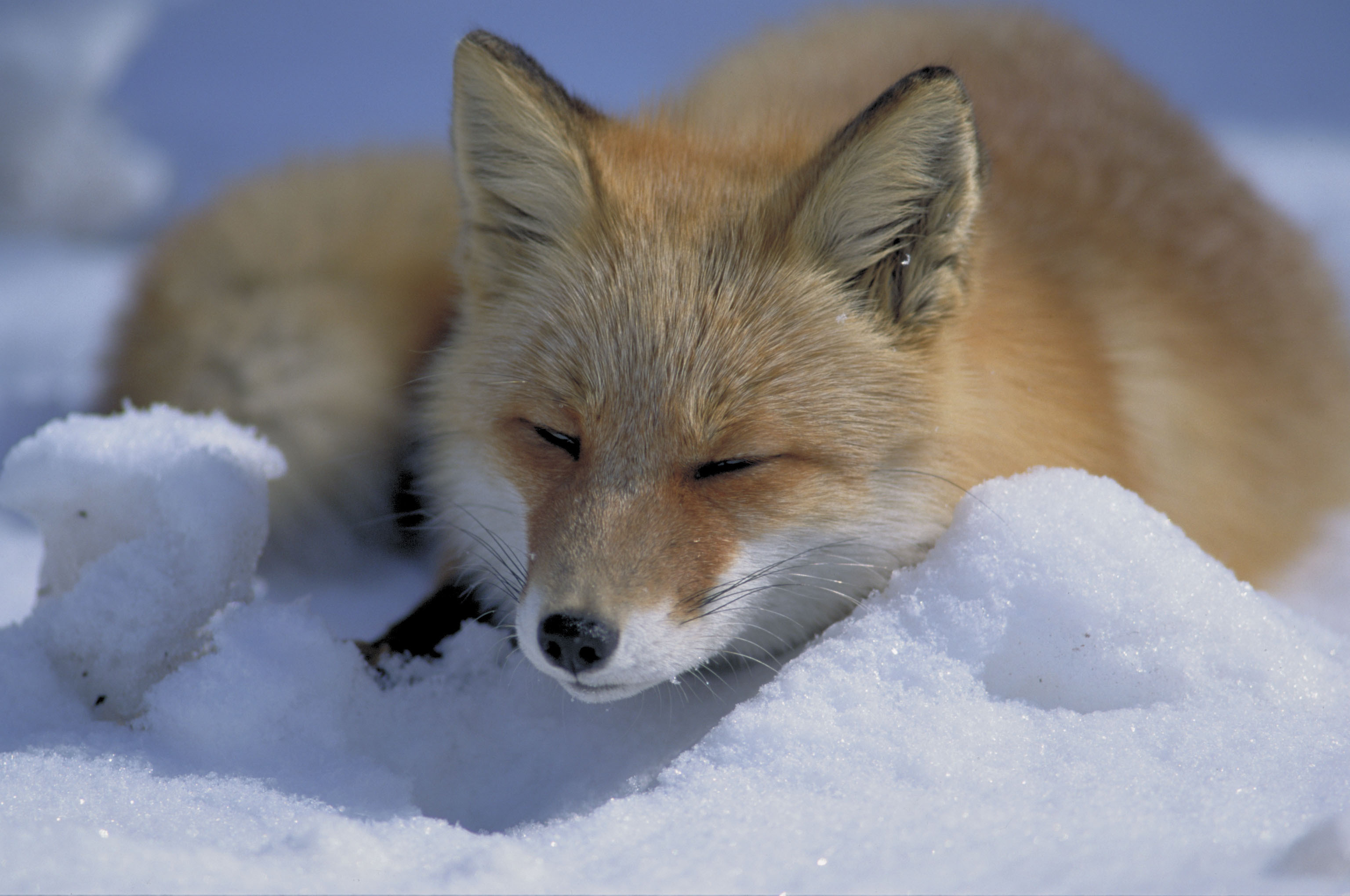
The Hokkaido red fox

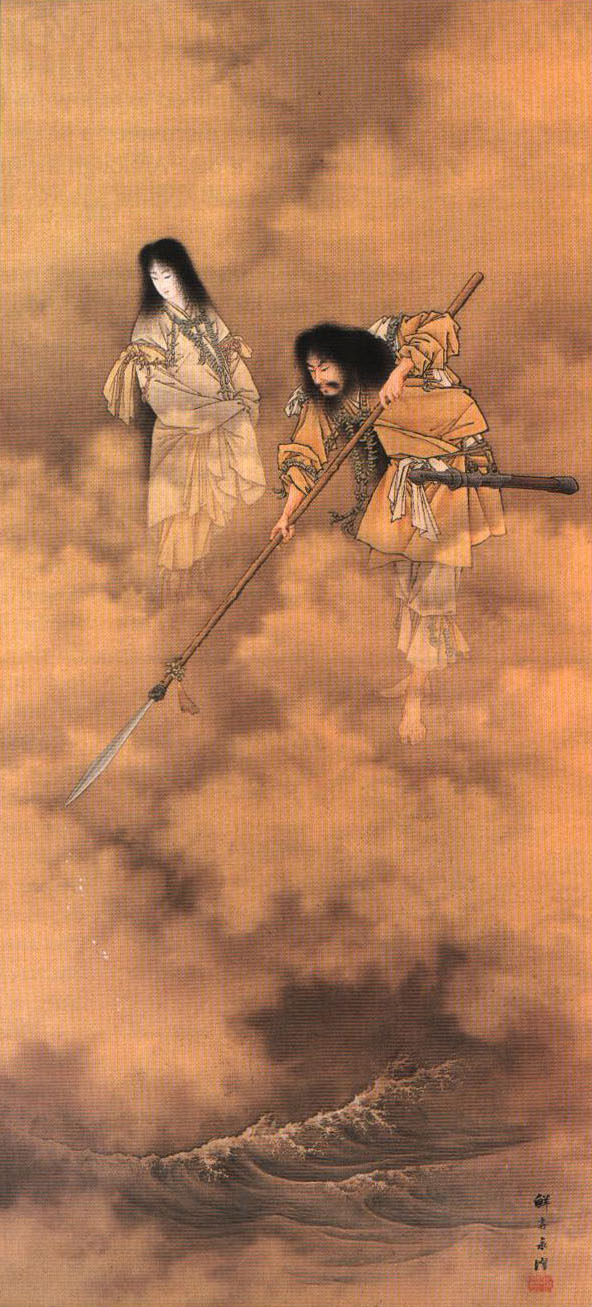
Searching the Seas with the Tenkei (天瓊を以て滄海を探るの図, Tenkei o motte sōkai o saguru no zu). Painting by Kobayashi Eitaku, 1880–1890 (MFA, Boston). Izanagi to the right, Izanami to the left.

=== Origins and early history ===
The origin of Inari worship is not entirely clear. The first recorded use of the present-day kanji (characters) of Inari's name, which mean "carrying rice" (literally "rice load"), was in the Ruijū Kokushi in 892 AD. Other sets of kanji with the same phonetic readings, most of which contained a reference to rice, were in use earlier, and most scholars agree that the name Inari is derived from ine-nari (稲成り, 'growing rice').

The worship of Inari is known to have existed as of 711 AD, the official founding date of the shrine at Inari Mountain in Fushimi, Kyoto. The first reported occurrence of Inari is also recorded 711 in the story that a rich man used rice cakes as targets for practice and made the kami of rice resentful. The kami flew towards the mountains in the shape of a white bird and perched on a cedar. The man realised he had abused a divine gift and in order to pacify the kami he built a shrine where the bird had landed. According to the surviving fragments of the Yamashiro no Kuni Fudoki, on which this account is based, the archer was named Hata no Irogu, and the bird, transformed once more, this time into a growing rice plant, came to rest on the peak of Mount Mitsugamine, part of Inari Mountain.

Scholars such as Kazuo Higo believe worship was conducted for centuries before that date; they suggest that the Hata clan began the formal worship of Inari as an agriculture kami in the late fifth century. The descendants of the Hata-clan were conducting Inari-worship to protect their crops and let their commerce and trade flourish, showing that even at the early stages of Inari-worship the kami was already associated with rice and commerce. The name Inari does not appear in classical Japanese mythology.

Other possible origins could come from the Ainu who have ceremony for the harvest of crops. In this ceremony the older men receive cereal cakes and offer their prayers. This is reminiscent of the idea of kami being food and would explain the close relationship inari has with food, especially rice. Other practices in witchcraft and divination of the Ainu include the use of a fox skull, showcasing other similarities to Inari. The deity is also connected with Korea or China, from which the Hata clan originates from.

=== Heian period ===
By the Heian period, Inari worship began to spread. In 823 AD, after Emperor Saga presented the Tō-ji temple to Kūkai, the founder of the Shingon Buddhist sect, the latter designated Inari as its resident protector kami. In 827, the court granted Inari the lower fifth rank, which further increased the deity's popularity in the capital. Inari's rank was subsequently increased, and by 942, Emperor Suzaku granted Inari the top rank in thanks for overcoming rebellions. At this time, the Fushimi Inari-taisha shrine was among the twenty-two shrines chosen by the court to receive imperial patronage, a high honor. The second Inari shrine, Takekoma Inari, was established in the late ninth century.

Inari's popularity continued to grow. The Fushimi shrine, already a popular pilgrimage site, gained wide renown when it became an imperial pilgrimage site in 1072. By 1338, the shrine's festival was said to rival the Gion Festival in splendor.

=== Medieval period (1185–1600) ===
In 1468, during the Ōnin War, the entire Fushimi shrine complex was burned. Rebuilding took about thirty years; the new building was consecrated in 1499. While the old complex had enshrined three kami in separate buildings, the new one enshrined five kami in a single building. The new shrine also included a Buddhist temple building for the first time, and the hereditary priesthood was expanded to include the Kada clan.

=== Edo Period ===
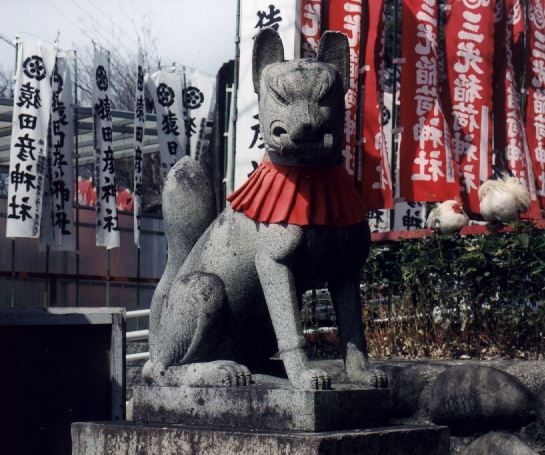
A statue of a kitsune adorned with a red votive bib in a shrine at Inuyama Castle. Many castles in Japan contain Inari shrines.

During the Edo period, Inari worship spread across Japan; it became especially prominent in Edo. Smyers attributes this spread to the movement of daimyō (feudal lords). Inari had by the sixteenth century become the patron of blacksmiths and the protector of warriors—for this reason, many castle compounds in Japan contain Inari shrines—and the daimyō took their belief in their protector kami with them when they relocated to a new domain.

Inari's divine role continued to expand. On the coast, they became a protector of fishermen. In Edo, they were invoked to prevent fires. They became the patron of actors and of prostitutes, since their shrines were often found near the pleasure quarters where these individuals lived. They began to be worshipped as the Desire-Fulfilling Inari, a deity of luck and prosperity. A common saying in Osaka was Byō Kōbō, yoku Inari ("For sickness [pray to] Kōbō, for desires [pray to] Inari"). Inari also began to be petitioned for good health; they are credited with curing such diverse afflictions as coughs, toothaches, broken bones, and syphilis. Women prayed to Inari to grant them children.

After a government decree mandated the separation of Buddhist and Shinto beliefs, many Inari shrines underwent changes. At Fushimi Inari, for instance, structures that were obviously Buddhist were torn down. Among the populace, the blended form of worship continued. Some Buddhist temples, such as Toyokawa Inari, maintained Inari worship by arguing that they had always been devoted to a Buddhist deity (often Dakiniten), which the common folk had mistaken as Inari.

In the Tokugawa period, when money replaced rice as the measure of wealth in Japan, Inari's role as a kami of worldly prosperity was expanded to include all aspects of finance, business, and industry. At the beginning of the eighteenth century, followers of Inari at the Ginza mint struck coins meant for offerings to Inari, which featured pictures of two foxes and a jewel or the characters for 'long life' and 'good luck'.

== Shrines and offerings ==
Inari is a popular deity with shrines and temples located throughout most of Japan. According to a 1985 survey by the National Association of Shinto Shrines, 32,000 shrines—more than one-third of Shinto shrines in Japan—are dedicated to Inari. This number includes only Shinto shrines with full-time resident priests; if small roadside or field shrines, shrines kept in a home or corporate office, smaller shrines without full-time resident priests, and Buddhist temples were included, the number would increase by at least an order of magnitude.

The entrance to an Inari shrine is usually marked by one or more vermilion torii and some statues of kitsune, which are often adorned with red yodarekake (votive bibs) by worshippers out of respect. This red color has come to be identified with Inari, because of the prevalence of its use among Inari shrines and their torii. The main shrine is the Fushimi Inari Shrine on mount Inari (稲荷⼭ Inariyama) in Fushimi, Kyoto, Japan, where the paths up the shrine hill are marked in this fashion.

The kitsune statues are at times taken for a form of Inari, and they typically come in pairs, representing a male and a female. These fox statues hold a symbolic item in their mouths or beneath a front paw—most often a jewel and a key, but a sheaf of rice, a scroll, or a fox cub are all common. Almost all Inari shrines, no matter how small, will feature at least a pair of these statues, usually flanking or on the altar or in front of the main sanctuary. The statues are rarely realistic; they are typically stylized, portraying a seated animal with its tail in the air looking forward. Despite these common characteristics, the statues are highly individual in nature; no two are quite the same.

Offerings of rice, sake, and other food are given at the shrine to appease and please these kitsune messengers, who are then expected to plead with Inari on the worshipper's behalf. Inari-zushi, a Japanese sushi roll of packaged fried tofu, is another popular offering. Fried tofu is believed to be a favorite food of Japanese foxes, and in some regions an Inari-zushi roll has pointed corners that resemble fox ears, thus reinforcing the association. Priests do not normally offer these foods to the deity, but it is common for shops that line the approach to an Inari shrine to sell fried tofu for devotees to offer. Fox statues are often offered to Inari shrines by worshippers, and on occasion a stuffed and mounted fox is presented to a temple. At one time, some temples were home to live foxes that were venerated, but this is not current practice.

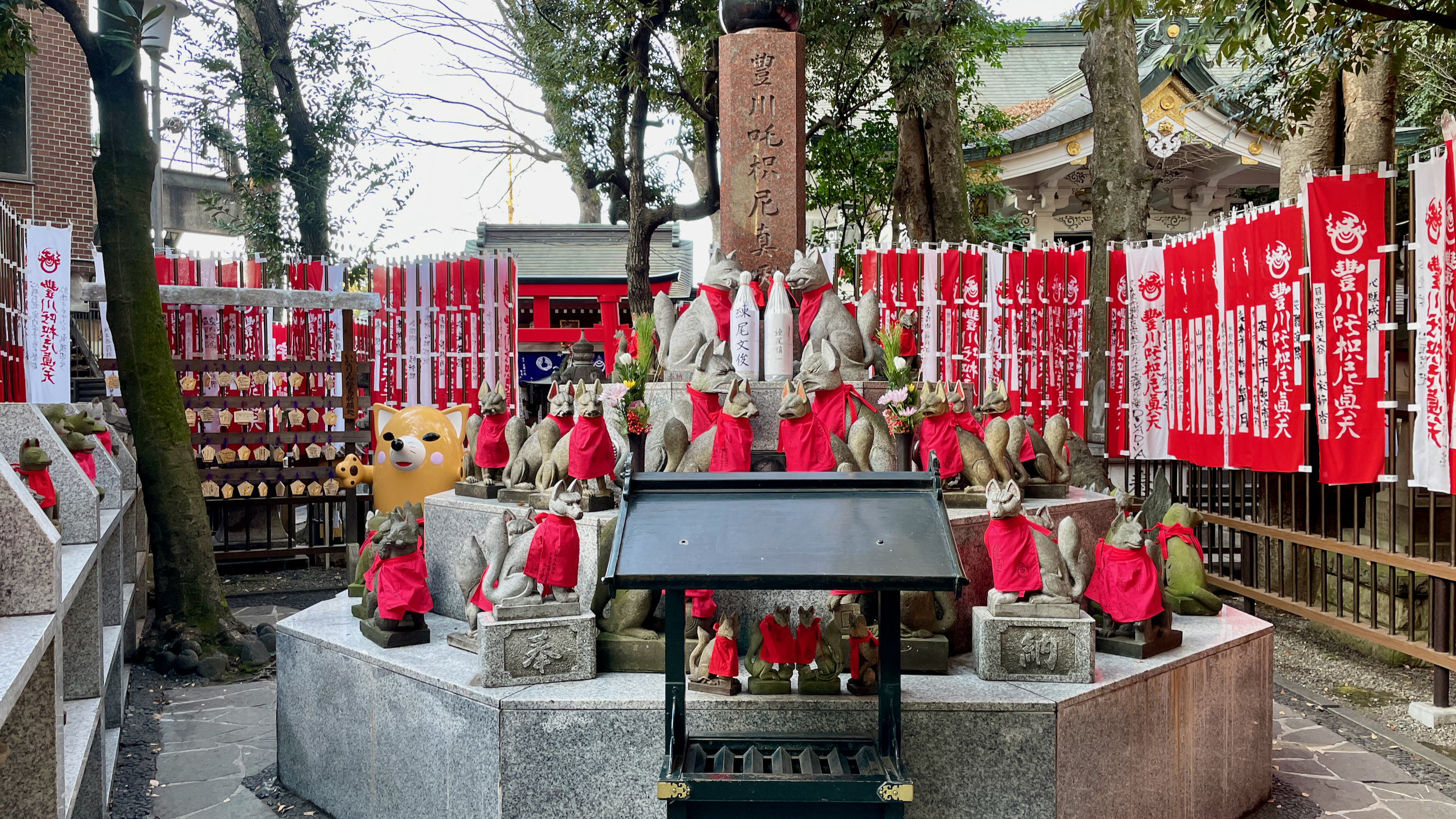
Hundreds of Inari can be found at Toyokawa Inari Betsuin in Akasaka.

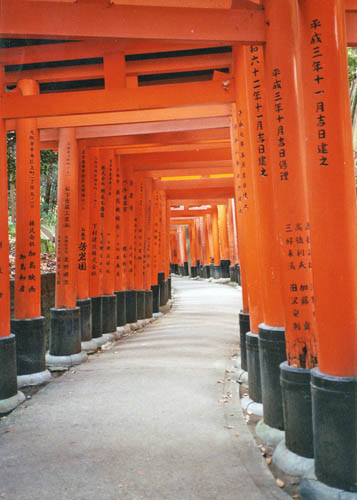
Red torii along a path at the Fushimi Inari shrine in Kyoto

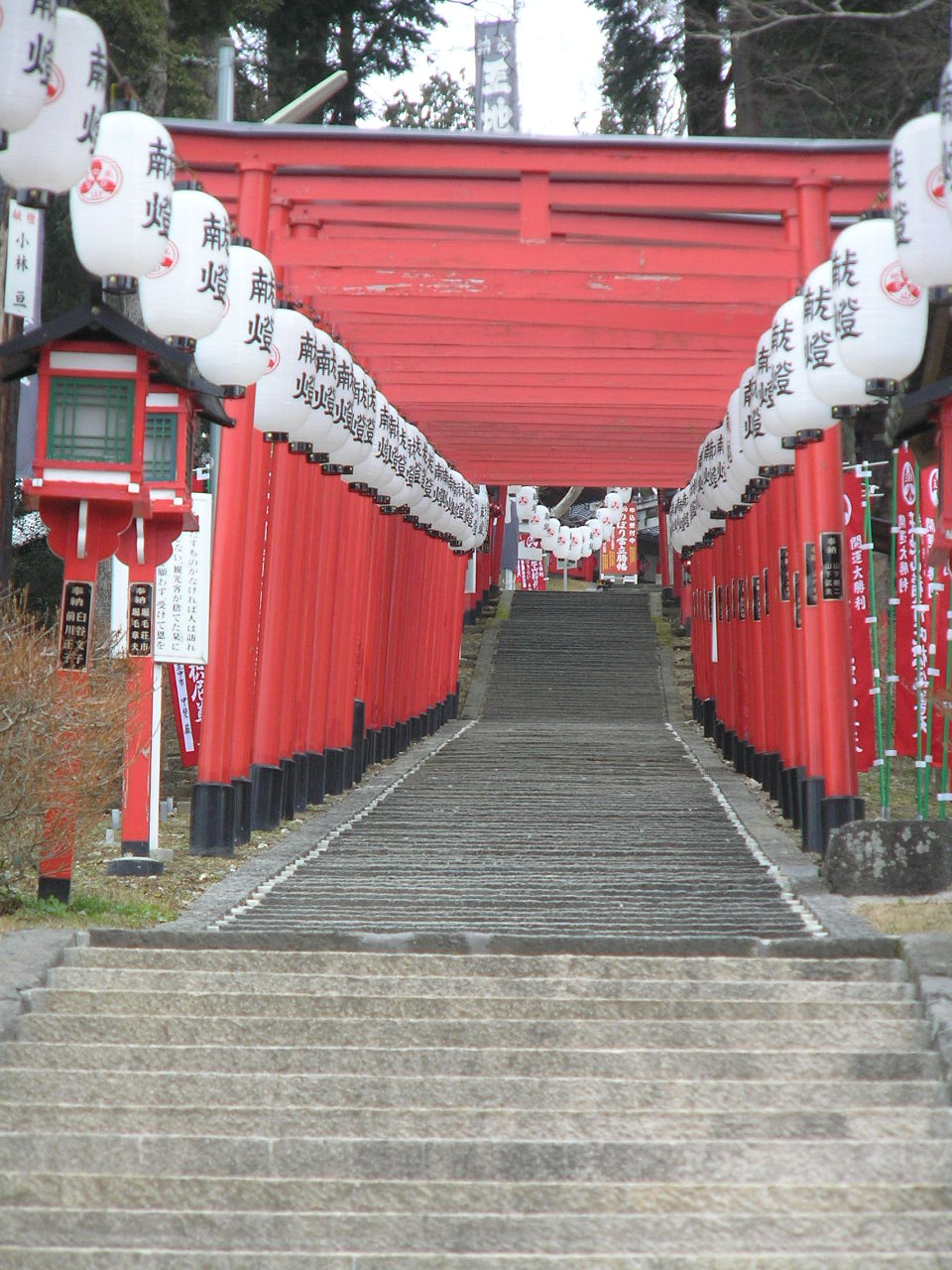
Torii of Ojiyama-Inari

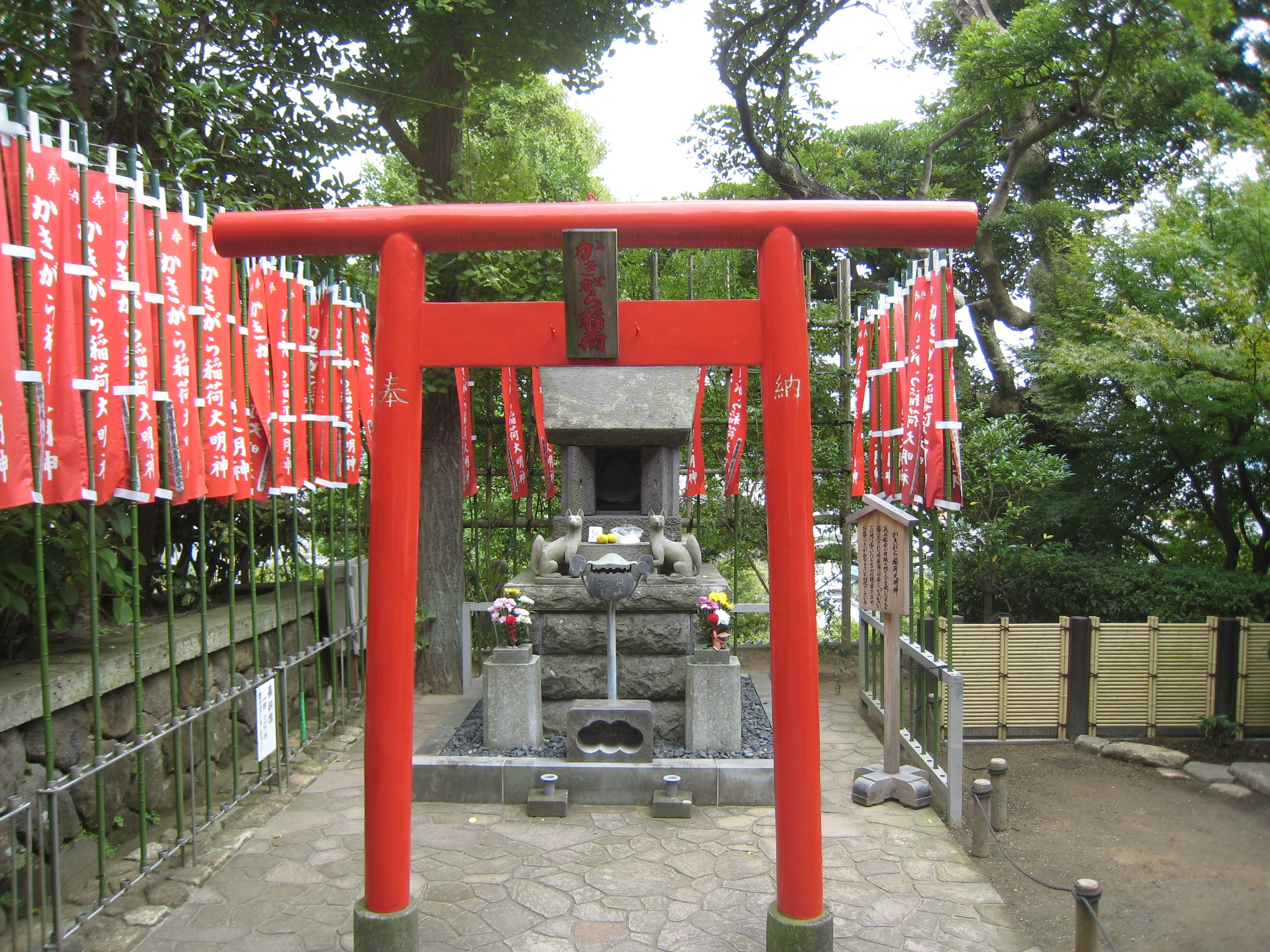
Kakigara-Inari at Hase-dera (Kamakura)

== Personalization ==
According to Inari scholar Karen A. Smyers, the "most striking feature of Inari worship is the high degree of diversification and even personalization of this kami. Devotees do not simply worship 'Inari,' but a separate form of Inari with its own name. Various Inari shrines and temples worship entirely different kami as Inari; traditions and symbols have a multiplicity of meanings." This is exemplified by the various kami Inari is identified with such as Uganomitama no Okami, Ukanomitama no kami, Ukemochi no kami, Wakumusubi no kami, and many more. In fact, except for ancestor worship, Inari worship is the most personalized of all Japanese religiosity.

Smyers also describes the concept of "personal Inari" or "watashi no O-Inari-sama" in Japanese. "One Shinto priest argued that the impulse to worship 'my own Inari' arose during the late Edo period and accounted for the great spread of Inari shrines at that time." Furthermore, "If there are one hundred believers, they will have a hundred different ideas about Inari." Smyers notes that Inari has been re-enshrined and divided with "far greater ease and frequency than other Shinto kami, and this may in part account for its great diversity."

This personalization is not restricted to Shinto practitioners, but also has ties with Buddhism. Inari is often described as being the "closest deity to humans" according to a Toyokawa priest in Smyers's article. "'It [Inari] is like your own mother, it grants your wishes. In times of illness when even a doctor cannot cure you, you have no alternative but to ask Inari. Buddhas have various ranks; Dakiniten [one of Inari's many other names] is at the ten (deva) level, the level closest to that of humans. So Inari has very close relations to people.'"

Inari's personalization also extends to Inari's messengers, the kitsune. In fact, Smyers attests that the fox is "the symbol most often equated with Inari."

Smyers's analysis is essentially thus: "Inari seems to have struck a fortuitous balance: famous and powerful enough to make people feel confident that he can help them, but lacking the sort of clear historical narrative that would prevent his personalization to fit particular needs."

Inari is thought to have both good and evil attributes.

== Inari pilgrimage ==
Like many other places of spiritual prominence, many practitioners of Shinto, especially Inari worship, take pilgrimage to Inari Mountain at the Fushimi Inari Shrine in Kyoto. Unlike other religions however, pilgrimage to and around the Fushimi Inari Shrine is the only standardized pilgrimage despite having some 40,000 shrines across Japan. This is in part due to the personalization Inari practitioners tend to have towards Inari as described above. According to Karen A. Smyers, "They have little reason to worship some other form in another place, which may even be seen as someone else's Inari".

The pilgrimage begins starting "at the foot of the mountain, in the midst of elegant red buildings house the five kami of Fushimi Inari Shrine and a number of other deities." Visitors need to first rinse their mouths and wash their hands, a means to symbolically purify oneself before becoming near the kami. The many red torii that Fushimi is known for are the main gateway to convey that one is entering a sacred space. Along the way through these torii and up the mountain, one will find various rock altars, tea houses, waterfalls, and many cedar trees, which symbolizes Inari's "manifestation in the grandeur of nature".

Upon reaching the peak, one "passes the place associated with the miraculous assistance of Inari in forging the emperor's sword". Then the pilgrim has a steady descent down the mountain and returns to the regular world outside of the sacred space. Despite this pathway, there is actually "no fixed route one must take through the thousands of sacred sites on the mountain, and pilgrims and groups tend to develop their own sacred histories, worshipping at the sites that are invested with particular meaning to them." Furthermore, "each version of the pilgrimage is a kind of musical improvisation on the theme of Inari."

Many traditions are also associated with Inari pilgrimage:

- Omo-karu ishi
  - A type of rock divination in which one may be granted an answer to a yes or no question.
- Neagari no matsu
  - This is a tree in which pilgrims in search of better business pray to.
- Echo Pond
  - If someone has lost someone, the pilgrim claps loudly and if they hear an echo, it signifies that the person they lost shall return.
- Oseki-San
  - One of the many forms of Inari that is said to be able to cure coughs, and many letters are sent to this rock altar from all across Japan. Priests of Fushimi personally deliver these letters to the mailbox next to the altar.
- Ninaigi
  - Another tree upon the shrine grounds that is "fallen over at an angle." Pilgrims who have "stiff shoulders from carrying things come and rub them under this inclined tree, which is polished smooth as a result."
- Other traditions include "tying votive bibs on the fox (and other) statues, offering food, dedicating larger or small torii, lighting candles, making segyo offerings (sometimes to the foxes) during the coldest season, and offering nobori banners in the kami's name. Offering small banners (konobori) in large numbers was also practiced; each small prayer flag made of paper had the name of the kami (i.e., Suehiro okami), the name and age of the petitioner, and the request (e.g., complete recovery from sickness)."

== Festival ==
Inari's traditional festival day was the first horse day (the sixth day) of the second month (nigatsu no hatsuuma) of the lunisolar calendar.

In some parts of Kyūshū, a festival or praying period begins five days before the full moon in November; occasionally it is extended to a full week. This is accompanied by bringing offerings of rice products to a shrine to Inari each day and receiving o-mamori (protection charms).

== See also ==
- Dewi Sri – Hindu Goddess of rice and fertility in Indonesia
- Dionysus – Ancient Greek god of winemaking and wine
- Huxian – Chinese deity
- Sukunabikona, also a Japanese Kami of sake brewing
- Loki – Norse god of mischief.
