= Toyouke-hime =

Goddess of food and grain in the Shinto religion

- Goddess of food and grain
- Other names: Luxuriant food princess
- Major cult centre: Chōkaisan Ōmonoimi Shrine; Toyouke Daijingu

Genealogy
- Parents: Wakumusubi (father)

Toyouke-hime (豊宇気毘売, Toyouke-bime; lit. "Luxuriant Food Princess") is the deity (kami) of food and grain in Japan. Originally enshrined in the Tanba Province (Note: This included the Tango region before it separated from the Tanba Province during the Nara period, where Kono Shrine is located.), it is said she was called to reside at the Outer Shrine (外宮, Gekū) of Ise Shrine in the 5th century, during the reign of Emperor Yūryaku, to offer sacred food to Amaterasu, the ruling kami and sun goddess. She is worshipped as a secondary kami at Chōkaisan Ōmonoimi Shrine.

Toyouke-Ōmikami (r: 5th row from the top) is a granddaughter to Izanagi by her father Wakumusubi, who was born while Izanami was still alive (based on Kojiki).

While now popular as Toyouke-Ōhmikami, her name has been transcribed using Chinese characters in several manners including Toyouke bime no kami (豊宇気毘売神) in the Kojiki, while there is no entry about her in the Nihon Shoki.

Several alternative transcription and names are attributed to this goddess including Toyouke-Okami, Toyouke-Ōmikami, Toyoukebime no kami (豊受気媛神), Toyuuke no kami (登由宇気神), Toyouka no Menokami (止与宇可乃売神), (Note: The letter "宇" in 止与宇可乃売神 is a simplified form of 口偏 + 宇.) Toyuke no Ōkami (等由気太神), and Toyohirume (とよひるめ). A male and female pair thought to be identical to Toyouke-Ōhmikami: the god Ōmonoimi (ja:大物忌神), who is enshrined on Mount Chōkai in Yamagata Prefecture, the northernmost post of the Yamato Kingship, and the goddess Toyooka-hime (豊岡姫). (Note: Dispute exists on whether Toyooka-hime is identical to Yafune Toyouke-hime-no-mikoto (屋船豊宇気姫命).)

There is a separate shrine dedicated to Toyouke-Ōmikami no ara-mitama (豊受大御神荒魂) called the Taka-no-miya (多賀宮) inside the Gekū.

== Mythology ==
In the Kojiki, Toyouke-hime is noted as the daughter of Wakumusubi and granddaughter of Izanami. After the tenson kōrin, she became enshrined in the “outer shrine in Watarai”. The uke (受) in her name refers to food, making her the kami of food and grains. This is why she has come to be conflated with Inari Ōkami and Ukanomitama in the same way as other food-related kami such as Ōgetsu-hime (Ukemochi).

The head priest of Toyouke Daijingu submitted Toyukegū Gishikichō (止由気宮儀式帳; Protocols of the Toyuke Shrine) to the Department of Divinities in 804, in which it is told that Toyouke-hime had originally been in Tanba Province. It records that Amaterasu came to Emperor Yūryaku in a dream and told him she alone was not able to supply enough food and needed him to bring Toyuke-no-Ōkami (等由気大神), the kami of divine food, from Manai Pond in Hiji Village, Tanba Province.

In the lost fudoki Tango no Kuni Fudoki (丹後国風土記) is a story explaining the origin of Nagu Shrine (奈具神社, Nagu Jinja) in which eight heavenly women were bathing in Manai Pond atop the hill Hijiyama in Hiji Village, Tanba Province. An elderly couple then hides one of the women's clothes, preventing her from returning to the heavenly realm. The woman lives in the elderly couple’s home for a while making sake that cures all ills, but she is chased from the house after about ten years. After wandering for some time, she settles in Nagu Village. This woman is Toyoukanome-no-Mikoto (豊宇賀能売命), another name for Toyouke-hime.

Another lost fudoki, Settsu no Kuni Fudoki (摂津国風土記), tells that Toyouka no Menokami (止与宇可乃売神) was on the mountain of Inakuradake in Settsu Province for a short time. (Note: A common misunderstanding is that Toyouke-hime was in Settsu Province before coming to Hiji Village in Tango Province, but this text states that she returned to Tango.)

== Faith and rituals ==
=== The original location ===
In Mineyama Town, Kyōtango, Kyoto prefecture, there is a well Seisuido (清水戸) and a story of the now lost half-moon-shaped rice paddy Tsukinowa den (月の輪田). They are believed to be the site where Toyouke had soaked rice seeds to encourage germination and planted the first rice. The Hinumanai Shrine (比沼麻奈為神社) is mentioned in Engishiki dating back to Heian period, as Taniwa (田庭) literally meaning the Garden of Rice Paddies. That ancient place name is thought to have changed over time to Taba (location of rice paddies), then to Tamba/Tanba (丹波).

On the slope of the Kuji Pass, there is a shrine dedicated to Ōkami, as well as Hoi no dan, the ruin of a sacred well Ame no manai of Takamagahara: That well was entered both in Kojiki and Nihonshoki, and was also the highest title given to water bodies. The shrine's auspicious spirit is said to be in the cuboid (盤座, Iwakura), which has been worshiped as Ōmiae-ishi (大饗石).

There is a shrine named Moto-Ise Toyouke Daijingu in Ōemachi, Fukuchiyama City to the south of Naiku of Moto-Ise uphill the Funaokayama. Its name literally means former Ise, where the priesthood has been inherited by Kawada clan, the further relative of the Fujiwara clan.

=== Amaterasu and Toyouke ===
Emperor Sujin appointed imperial daughter Princess Toyosuki-iri (豊鍬入姫命, Toyosuki-iri hime) as a Saiō to serve "as a cane for Amaterasu" to find a new location to reside, and dispatched Toyosuki-iri to travel from present day Nara to neighboring areas. It is said that on the route, several locations hosted the spirit of Amaterasu by building her shrines, while Tango had the first of such shrines among the list of relocation sites. The shrines which Amaterasu as their main kami are:

- Geku, Ise Jingu (Ise, Mie Prefecture),
- Nagusha (Kyōtango, Kyoto prefecture),
- Okumiya Ama no manai Shrine, Kono jinja (Miyazu, Kyoto prefecture), and
- Hinumanai Shrine (Kyōtango).

In addition, Toyouke-Ōmikami is worshiped at many branches of Ise shrines called Shinmei shrines, along with Amaterasu, and separate shrines are often built on the property of Toyouke-Ōmikami regular shrines. There are also Inari shrines where they build altars for Toyouke as well.

According to the discipline of Ise Shintō (Watarai Shintō) originated by a priest at Geku named Watarai Ieyuki (度会家行), Toyouke-Ōmikami is recognized as the first divine being which appeared in this world. In their idea, Toyouke is also identical to Ame no minakanushi and Kuni no tokotachi. In this sect of Shinto, Geku, or the shrine of Toyouke-Ōmikami, is treated as ranking higher than Naiku, or the shrine of Amaterasu. Central to this argument was the association of Toyouke with the elemental force of water, whose relationship to the sun deity Amaterasu, linked to fire, was expressed through paired equivalences of water and fire, yin and yang, and sun and moon. Watarai Ieyuki set out these ideas most fully in his 1320 treatise Ruiju Jingi Hongen, drawing on an earlier core of texts known collectively as the Shintō Gobusho ("Five Books of Shinto").

=== Omonoimi ===
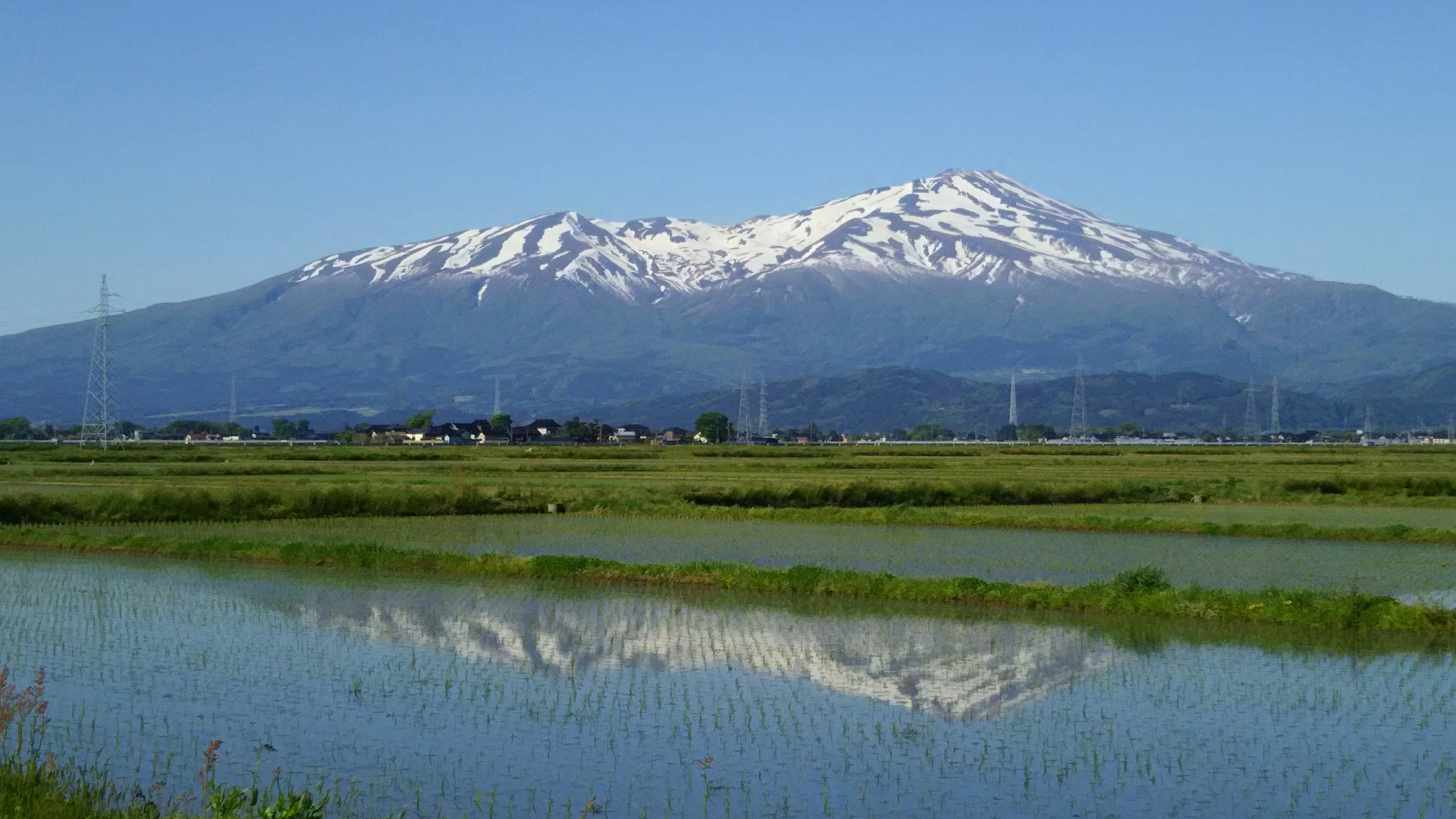
Mt. Chokai

Omonoimi no Kami is the God of Chōkaisan Ōmonoimi Shrine and Mount Chokai. There are shrines that enshrine Omonoiminokami in various other places in the Tohoku region, including Chōkai gassan ryōsho-gu.

Omonoimi no kami is considered a possible alternate name to Toyouke-hime (Note: Ōmonoimi-no-kami is believed to be the god of Mount Chōkai in Yamagata prefecture, or the northernmost post of the land of Yamato.)

He is associated with industrial growth.

Every time Mount Chōkai erupted his rank increased.

== See also ==
- Honji suijaku
- List of Japanese deities
- Ukemochi

== Bibliography ==
- Anzu, Motohiko (January 1972). "Shinto Theory of the Outer Shrine, the Five Canonical Books of Shinto from (Watarai) Ieyuki to (Kitabatake) Chikafusa (外宮神道論--神道五部書から家行と親房とへ, Geku Shintoron, Shinto Gobusho kara Ieyuki to Chikafusa e)". Shinto Shukyo (神道宗教) (65/66). Tokyo: 67–96. ISSN 0387-3331. Originally published in 1954.
- "Kojiki (Chamberlain, 1882) - Wikisource, the free online library". en.wikisource.org.
- Herbert, Jean (2010-10-18). "X: Genesis of the Universe — The pre-material stages". Shinto: At the Fountainhead of Japan. London: Routledge. ISBN 978-1-136-90376-2.
- Kawaguchi, Kenji (1999). Nihon no kamisama yomitoki-jiten (日本の神様読み解き事典) (in Japanese). Kashiwa shobo. p. 174. OCLC 43395896.ISBN 4760118241, 9784760118243
- Sonoda, Minoru [in Japanese]; Mogi, Sakae (1997). Nihon no kamigami no jiten : Shinto saishi to yaoyorozu no kamigami. Books esoterica, 2.; New sight mook (in Japanese). Gakken. pp. 68, 69. ISBN 9784056016291. OCLC 42978057.
- Tobe, Tamio [in Japanese] (1997). Yaoyorozu no kamigami : Nihon no shinreitachi no purofiru [Eight million gods and goddesses in Japan : their profiles as divine spirits in Japan]. Truth in fantasy (Tokyo, Japan), 31 (in Japanese). Shinkigensha. pp. 91, 109–111.
- Tobe, Tamio (2004). 「日本の神様」がよくわかる本 八百万神の起源・性格からご利益までを完全ガイド [Understanding Japan's Gods: The complete guide, including the origins, personalities, and blessings of the eight million gods] (in Japanese). PHP Institute, Inc. ASIN B00Q60TYN2.
