= Shiramine Shrine =

Shinto shrine in Kyoto, Japan

Shiramine Shrine 白峯神宮
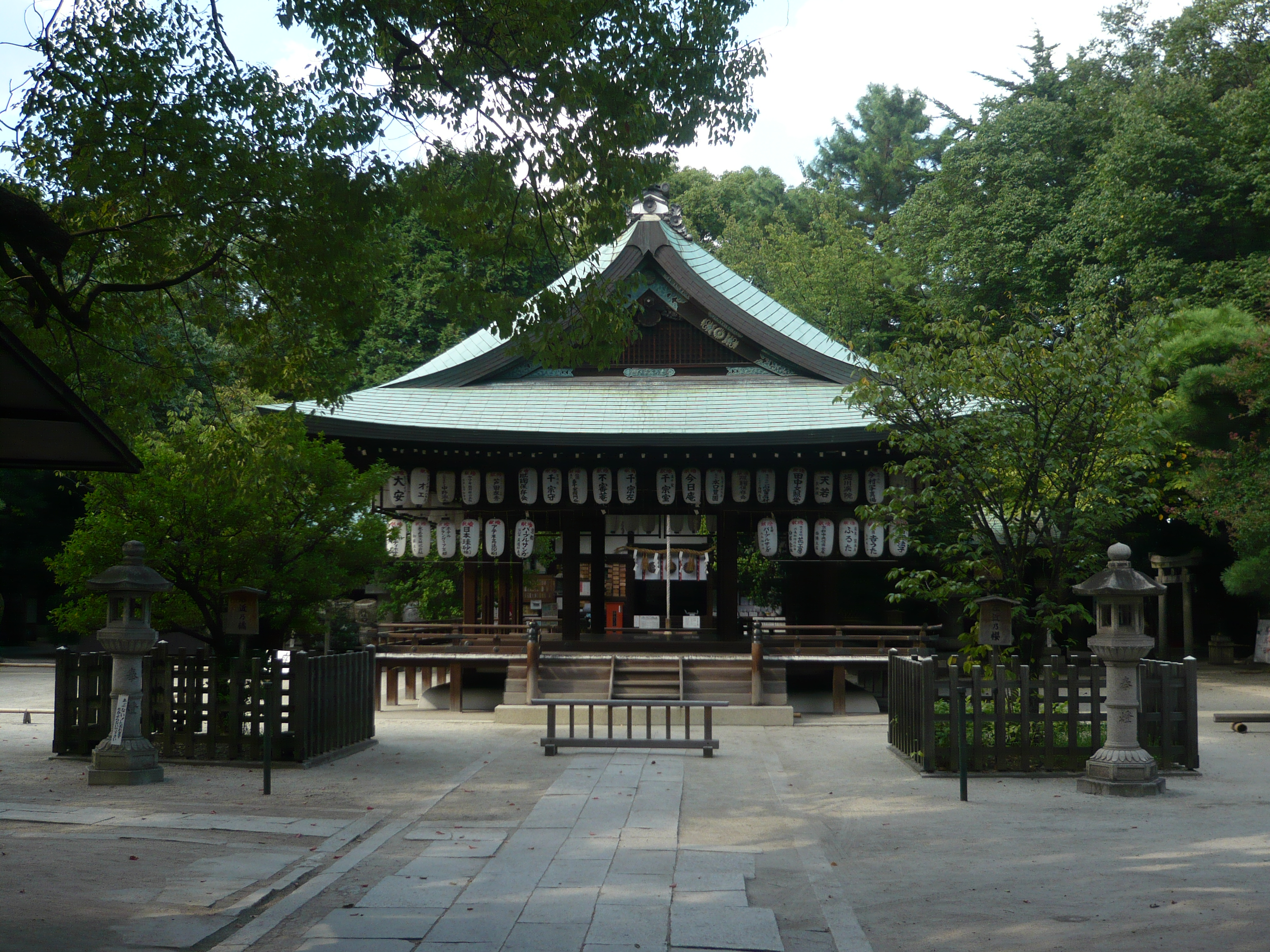
- The haiden of Shiramine-jingū, Kamigyō,

- Location within Japan

Religion
- Affiliation: Shinto
- Deity: Emperor Junnin, Emperor Sutoku
- Type: Imperial Shrine

Location
- Interactive map of Shiramine Shrine 白峯神宮
- Coordinates: 35.0303°N 135.753°E

Shiramine Shrine (白峯神宮, Shiramine jingū) is a Shinto shrine in Kamigyō-ku, Kyoto

The Shrine is dedicated to the veneration of the kami of Emperor Junnin and Emperor Sutoku. Annually, in mid–September, two Noh performances are held at the Shiramine Shrine in memory of Emperor Sutoku.

Shiramine is also home to the deity Seidai Myojin, who is popularly known as the god of sports, and especially soccer.

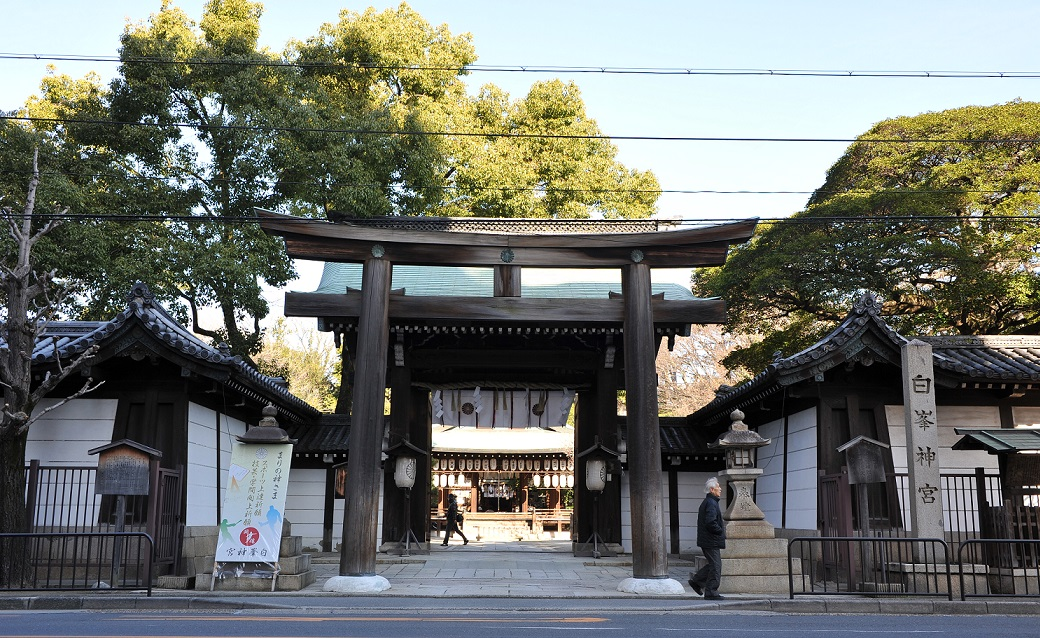
Shrine exterior

The lucky charm(叶う輪 Kanauwa) of Shiramine Shrine is very popular to worshipers. Kanauwa are a lucky charm of sports.

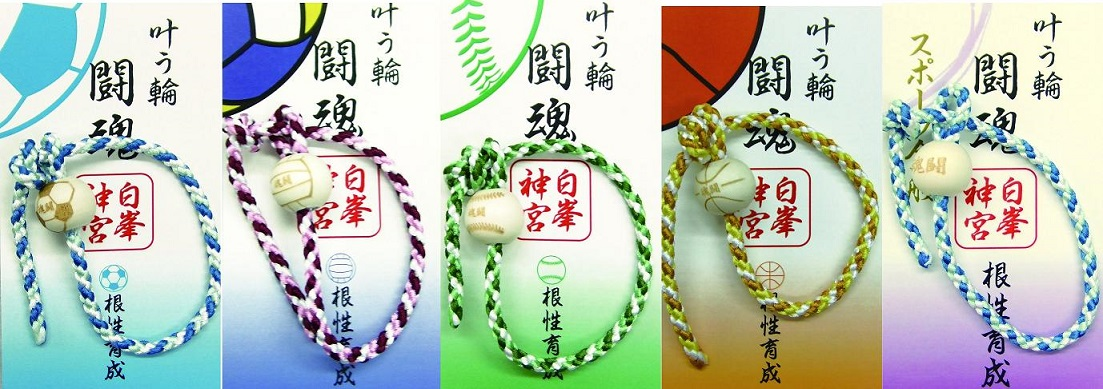
Kanauwa are a lucky charm of sports.

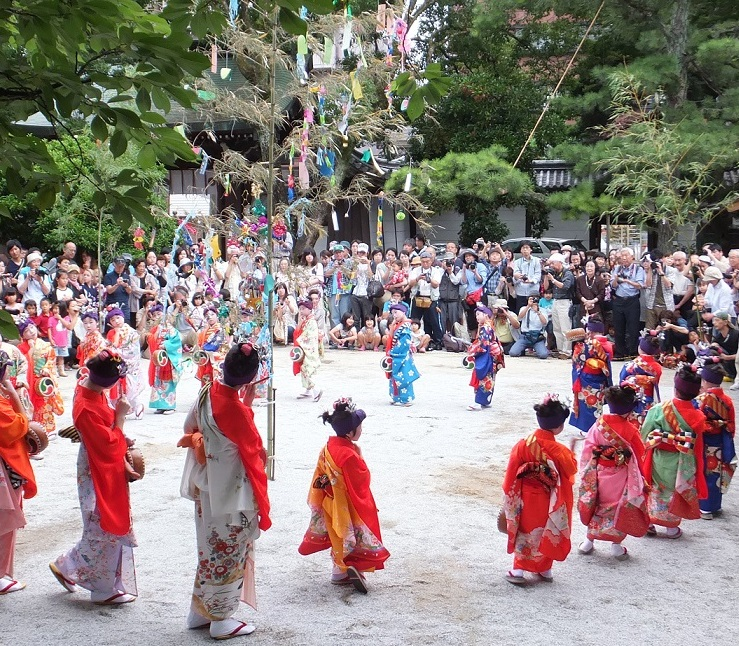
Komachi-odori

== Kanpei-sha ==
In 1871, the Kanpei-sha (官幣社) identified the hierarchy of government-supported shrines most closely associated with the Imperial family. The kampeisha were shrines venerated by the imperial family. This category encompasses those sanctuaries enshrining emperors, imperial family members, or meritorious retainers of the Imperial family. Up through 1940, the mid-range of Imperial shrines or Kanpei-chūsha (官幣中社) included the shrine; it was then known as Shiramine-gū. In 1940, Shiramine's status was changed to Kanpei-taisha (官幣大社), which is the highest rank; since then, it has been known as Shiramine jingū.

== See also ==
- List of Jingū
- Modern system of ranked Shinto Shrines
- Kemari
