= Isetsuhiko =

Japanese god of the wind

Isetsuhiko-no-mikoto (伊勢都彦命 or 伊勢都比古命) is an obscure Japanese god of the wind who appears in both the Fudoki of Ise Province (surviving only in the form of excerpts found in other writings) and the Fudoki of Harima Province.

== Myths ==
=== Isetsuhiko and Amenohiwake ===
Two stories about Isetsuhiko appear in the extant fragments of the Ise Fudoki. One excerpt involves his surrender of his land (what would become Ise) to Amenohiwake-no-mikoto (天日別命), who claimed it in the name of the Emperor Jimmu.

The following is said in the Ise Fudoki:

The land of Ise was pacified by Amenohiwake-no-mikoto, a twelfth-generation descendant of Amenominakanushi-no-mikoto.
At the time when Amenohiwake-no-mikoto accompanied the Sovereign (Sumera-mikoto) Kamu-Yamato-Iwarehiko when he set out from the western palace in order to conquer this eastern land, he arrived with the Sovereign in the village of Kumano in the land of Kii. Then, under the guidance of a golden crow, they entered the central land, arriving at Shimotsu-agata in Uda.
The Sovereign commanded Ōtomo-no-Hiomi-no-mikoto, 'Quickly subjugate the rebellious Nagasune of Ikoma.' He then ordered Amenohiwake-no-mikoto, 'There is a land in the east (lit. 'in the direction of heaven (?)'); pacify that land.'
He then bequeathed to him a sword as a symbol of his commission (shirushi-no-tsurugi). Upon receiving the command, Amenohiwake-no-mikoto went several hundreds of ri east.
There was a kami in that area whose name was Isetsuhiko. Amenohiwake-no-mikoto asked him, 'Will you give your land to the Heavenly Grandson?'
He answered, 'I have sought for this land and have lived here long. I will not obey your command.'
Amenohiwake-no-mikoto then dispatched troops to kill that god. At once, [Isetsuhiko] gave in out of fear and said submissively, 'I surrender the whole land to the Heavenly Grandson. I will not live in it any longer.'
Amenohiwake-no-mikoto asked, 'When you leave, how can I be sure [of your departure]?'
[Isetsuhiko] said, 'Tonight I shall cause the eight winds to blow over the waters of the sea and ride the waves to go east. Thus will I depart.' Amenohiwake-no-mikoto, making ready his troops, kept watch on him.
Around midnight, a great wind blew from all four directions, creating strong waves shining like the sun、so that both land and sea became bright. Riding upon the waves, [Isetsuhiko] then headed east—whence comes the old saying,

The land of Ise, of the divine wind, whither waves from eternal Tokoyo repair.

(The god Isetsuhiko was made to live in the nearby province of Shinano.) Upon taming this land, Amenohiwake-no-mikoto sent word back to the Sovereign. The Sovereign, greatly pleased, ordered the land be called 'Ise' after the god of the land's name and gave it to Amenohiwake-no-mikoto to govern, granting him the village of Miminashi in Yamato as his residence."

In a certain volume it is said:

Amenohiwake-no-mikoto, upon receiving the command, immediately went from the village of Kumano to the land of Ise. Killing the unruly kami and punishing the insubordinate, he set mountains and rivers as boundaries and established the districts of the land. Afterwards he sent word back to the palace at Kashihara." (Note: 「夫伊勢國者。天御中主尊之十二世孫。天日別命之所平。治天日別命。神倭磐餘彥天皇。自彼西宮。征此東州之時。隨天皇到紀伊國熊野村。于時隨金烏之導。入中州而到於菟田下縣。天皇敕大部日臣命曰。逆黨膽駒長髓宜早征罰。且敕天日別命曰。國有天津之方宜平其國。即賜標劒。天日別命奉敕。東入數百里。其邑有神名曰伊勢津彥。天日別命問曰。汝國獻於天孫哉。答曰。吾覓此國居住日久。不敢聞命矣。天日別命發兵欲戮其神。于時畏伏啟云。吾國悉獻於天孫。吾敢不居矣。天日別命令問云。汝之去時。何以爲驗。啟曰。吾以今夜起八風。吹海水乘波浪將東入。此則吾之却由也。天日別命整兵窺之。比及中夜。大風四起。扇擧波瀾。光耀如日。陸國海共朗。遂乘波而東焉。古語云神風伊勢國者。常世浪寄國者蓋此謂之也。伊勢津彥神、近令住信濃國。天日別命、懷柔此國、復命天皇。天皇大歡詔曰。國宜取國神之名。號伊勢。即爲天日別命之之村。此國賜宅地于大倭耳梨之村焉。或本云。天日別命奉詔自熊野村直入伊勢國。殺戮荒神。罰平不遵。堺山川定地邑。然後復命橿原宮焉。」)

=== Isetsuhiko's stone fortress ===
A second excerpt from the Ise Fudoki relates another legend about the god and the origin of the name 'Ise'.

It is said in the Ise Fudoki:

'Ise' derives from the kami residing at Anashi shrine in Iga, Izumonotakeko-no-mikoto (出雲建子命), a son of a (or 'the') kami of Izumo, also known as Isetsuhiko-no-mikoto (伊勢都彦命) and Amenokushitama-no-mikoto (天櫛玉命).
Long ago, this god made a fortress out of stone and dwelt therein. Abeshihiko-no-kami (阿倍志彦神) came [to conquer it], but he did not prevail and so retreated. This is where [Ise] gets its name. (Note: 「伊勢國風土記云。伊勢云者。伊賀穴志社坐神。出雲神子出雲建子命。又名伊勢都彥命。又名天櫛玉命。此神昔石造城坐。於芝阿倍志彥神來集。不勝而還却。因以為名也。」) (Note: i.e. 'Ise' is derived from the word for 'stone fortress' (石城 iwa-ki or ishi-ki).)

== In the Harima Fudoki ==
Isetsuhiko-no-mikoto (伊勢都比古命) is also mentioned in passing in the Fudoki of Harima Province as the son of Iwa-no-ōkami (伊和大神), god of Iwa Shrine, believed to dwell in Iseno (伊勢野, part of modern Hayashida-chō, Himeji City) with his sister, Isetsuhime-no-mikoto (伊勢都比売命). (Note: 「所以名伊勢野者。此野毎在人家。不得静安。於是衣縫猪手。漢人刀良等祖。将居此処。立社山本敬。祭在山岑神伊和大神子。伊勢都(比)古命。伊勢都比売命矣。自此以後。家々静安。遂得成里。即号伊勢(野)。」)

== Identification with Takeminakata ==
Since the Edo period, a number of authors - among them the Kokugaku scholar Motoori Norinaga - have attempted to identify Isetsuhiko with the god Takeminakata who briefly appears in the Kojiki, due to perceived parallels between the two deities.

- Isetsuhiko is said to be the son of a god of Izumo Province, with his father being identified in the Harima Fudoki as Iwa-no-ōkami, a god often conflated with Ōkuninushi, Takeminakata's father in the Kojiki. In addition, he is also considered to be a god of the wind like Takeminakata.
- The account of Isetsuhiko's surrender to Amenohiwake shows a thematic similarity to Takeminakata's surrender to Takemikazuchi in the Kojiki, both accounts even ending with the deity in question being sent to exile in Shinano Province. (Note, however, that the detail about Isetsuhiko being going to Shinano was an addition by a later hand.)

== See also ==
- Fudoki
- Ise Province
- Takeminakata
