= Ukanomitama =

Japanese deity of agriculture

Ukanomitama-no-Kami
- Goddess of food and agriculture
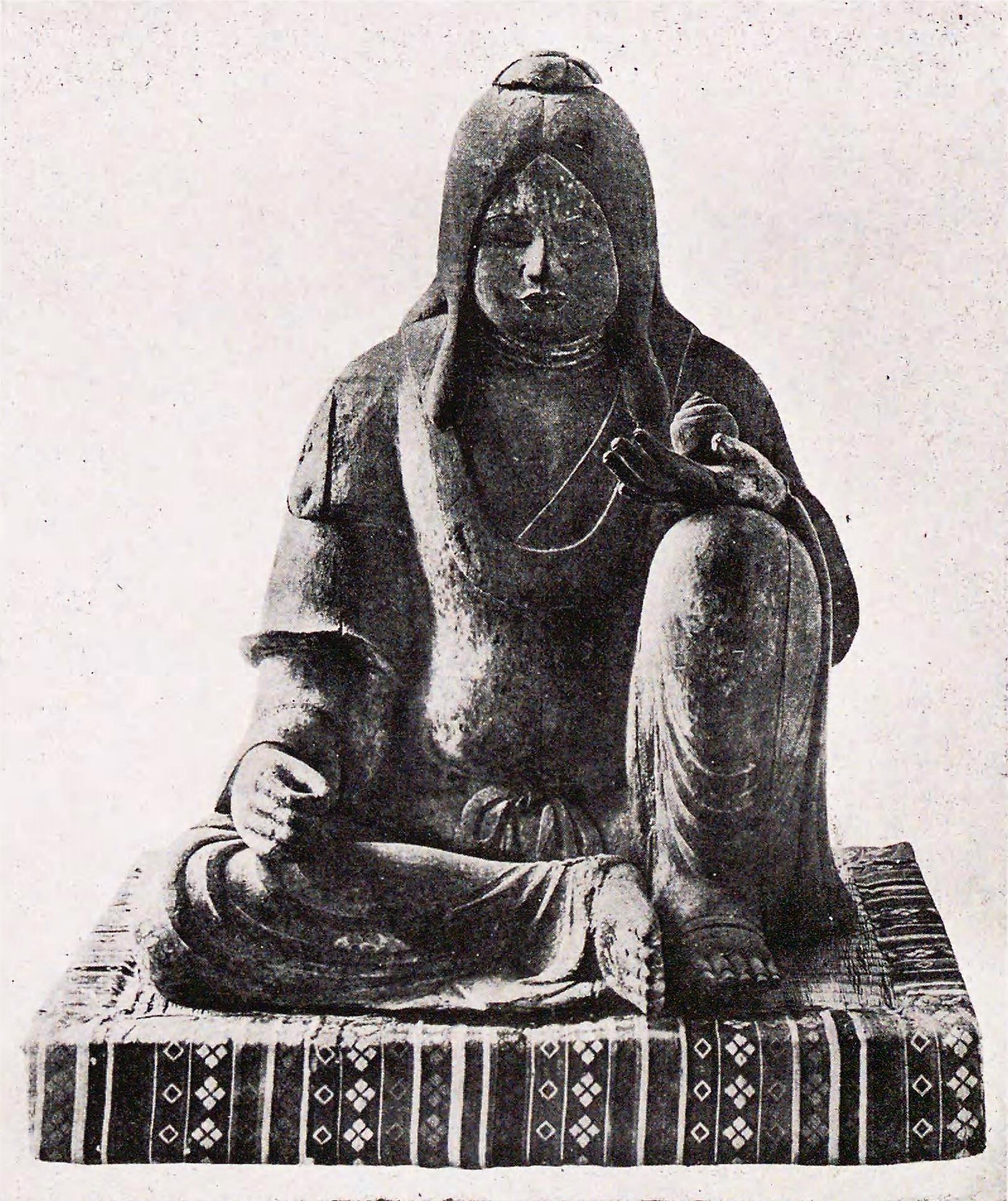
- Heian period statue of Ukanomitama at Ozu Shrine in Moriyama, Shiga Prefecture
- Other names: Ukanomitama-no-Mikoto (倉稲魂命) Mikura-no-Kami (御倉神) Miketsukami (御食津神, 三狐神)
- Japanese: 宇迦之御魂神
- Major cult center: Fushimi Inari Taisha, Kasama Inari Shrine, Yūtoku Inari Shrine and others
- Texts: Kojiki, Nihon Shoki and others

Genealogy
- Parents: Susanoo-no-Mikoto and Kamuōichihime (Kojiki); Izanagi and Izanami (Nihon Shoki)
- Siblings: Ōtoshi (Kojiki)

Ukanomitama (宇迦之御魂神 – Mighty Soul of Sustenance - Kojiki) (倉稲魂命 - Nihongi) is a kami in classical Japanese mythology, associated with food and agriculture, often identified with Inari, the deity of rice.

== Name and mythology ==
The Kojiki identifies Ukanomitama (宇迦之御魂神 Ukanomitama-no-Kami) as the child of Susanoo by his second wife Kamu-Ōichihime (神大市比売), who was a daughter of Ōyamatsumi (大山津見神), the god of mountains. This text portrays Ukanomitama as the younger sibling of the harvest deity Ōtoshi-no-Kami.

A variant account recorded in the Nihon Shoki meanwhile portrays Ukanomitama (here referred to as 倉稲魂命 Ukanomitama-no-Mikoto) as an offspring of Izanagi and Izanami who was born when the two became hungry.

The deity's name is understood as being derived from uka no mitama, "august spirit (mitama) of food (uka)". While the above texts are silent regarding the deity's gender, Ukanomitama has long been interpreted to be female, perhaps due to association with other agricultural deities such as Toyouke or Ukemochi.

== Bibliography ==
- Aston, William George, tr. (1896). Nihongi: Chronicles of Japan from the Earliest Times to A.D. 697. London: Kegan Paul, Trench, Trübner & Co.
- Chamberlain, Basil, tr. (1882). A Translation of the "Ko-Ji-Ki," or "Records of Ancient Matters". Yokohama: Lane, Crawford & Co.
- Philippi, Donald L. (2015). Kojiki. Princeton University Press. ISBN 978-1400878000.

== See also ==
- Toyouke-Ōmikami
- Ukemochi
