= Karen Ann Smyers =

American academic (born 1954)

Karen Ann Smyers (born October 31, 1954) is an American academic with a special interest in Japan. She has also developed a second career as a Jungian analyst.

== Early life ==
Smyers earned her undergraduate degree at Smith College and she earned her Ph.D. in Anthropology from Princeton University. Her doctoral thesis was entitled "The fox and the jewel: a study of shared and private meanings in Japanese Inari worship." She is known as an expert on Inari Ōkami and Inari-related literature.

== Career ==
Smyers taught in the Religion Department at Wesleyan University.

=== Jungian analyst ===
In 2001, Smyers enrolled in the Jung Institute in Zürich, Switzerland. In 2007, she was awarded a diploma from the International School of Analytical Psychology (ISAP). She established a practice as a Jungian analyst in Hadley, Massachusetts.

Smyers became the President of the Western Massachusetts Association of Jungian Psychology.

== Selected works ==
In a statistical overview derived from writings by and about Karen Ann Smyers, OCLC/WorldCat encompasses roughly 3 works in 10+ publications in 1 language and 300+ library holdings.

- The Fox and the Jewel: a Study of Shared and Private Meanings in Japanese Inari Worship (1993)

Articles

- "'My Own Inari' - Personalization of the Deity in the Inari Worship," Japanese Journal of Religious Studies, Vol. 23, No. 1-2 (1996), pp. 85–116.
