= Mizuhanome =

Goddess in Japanese mythology

Gods born from Izanami's illness and death (based on the Kojiki) Displayed in SVG (supported browsers only)

Mizuhanome (彌都波能売神 or みつはのめのかみ) is a divinity of water in Japanese mythology. She was born from the urine of Izanami.

== Worship ==
She is enshrined at Atago Shrine. Ashiya Shrine and Niukawakami Shrine are also dedicated to her.

== Names ==
She is also referred to as Mizuhanome or Itsu no Mitsuhanome no kami. In romaji her name is read as Mitsuhanomenokami.

The mitsu or mizu in her name means water and me is a feminine suffix. Her name is explained as water snake woman or water dragon woman.

== In popular culture ==
According to director Makoto Shinkai the name for the character Mitsuha Miyamizu from the movie Your Name is said to come from the goddess.

== Related items ==
- Family tree of Japanese deities
- Japanese gods
- Suijin
- Yoshikami God

== See also ==
- Id:Invaded
