= Haniyasu-hiko and Haniyasu-hime =

Gods of earth, clay, and pottery in Japanese mythology

Haniyasu-hiko and Haniyasu-hime are two gods of earth, clay, and pottery in Japanese mythology. The two of them are collectively known by the name Haniyasu no kami. The pair are considered husband and wife as well as siblings. They are also viewed as having the same divine virtues and powers.

The Nihongi says that the two of them were born from Izanami and Izanagi after the birth of the great islands of Japan. The Kojiki says that they were born from Izanami's feces, after she died while giving birth to Kagu-tsuchi.

== Etymology ==
The name Haniyasu is thought to mean “to knead earth so as to make it soft” or “clay easy”.
