= Wakumusubi =

Japanese deity

- Agriculture

Genealogy
- Parents: Izanami
- Siblings: Mizuhanome
- Children: Toyouke

Wakumusubi (和久産巣日神) is a kami of agriculture. In many versions, he was born from the urine of Izanami when she died. Another version of the Nihon Shoki states he was a child of Kagutsuchi and Haniyasu-hime.

He is enshrined at Aiki Jinja.

He is the brother of Mizuhanome. He is also the father of Toyouke-Ōmikami.

== See also ==
- Musuhi
