= Ukemochi =

Goddess of food in the Shinto faith

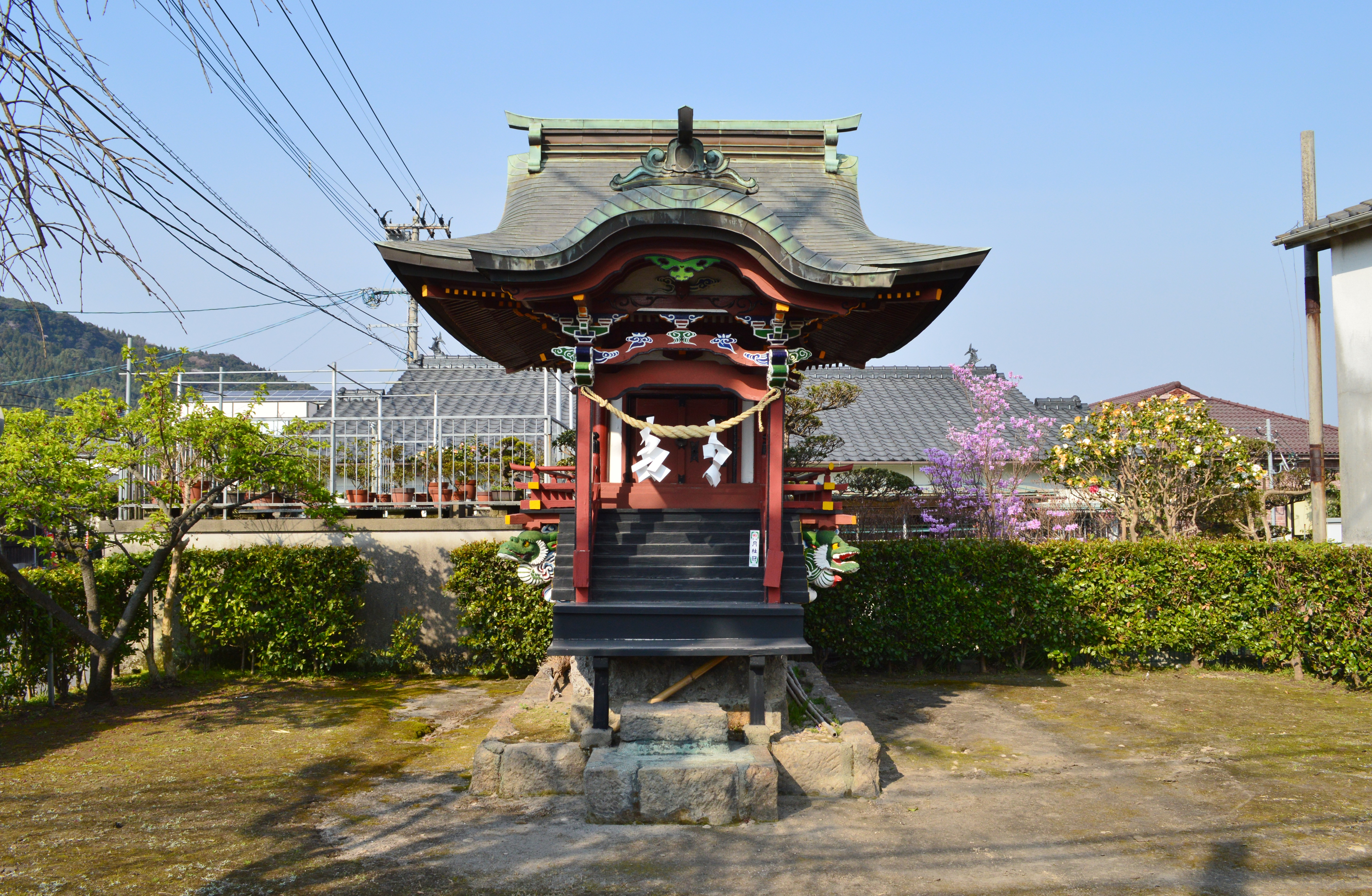
Kagoshima Jingu Overseas Hoshoku Shrine

Ōgetsu-hime (大宜都比売神/ 大気都比売神/ 大宜津比売神/ 大気津比売神, Ōgetsu-hime/ Ohogetsu-hime-no-kami), commonly known as Ukemochi (保食, Ukemochi; Deity Who Protects Food; Old Japanese: 保食, romanized: Ukamoti), the daughter of the deities Izanagi and Izanami, is a goddess of food in Japan and appears as a dema deity. Ukemochi is referred to as both male and female in different contexts. When shown in other forms, Ukemochi takes the shape of a fox.

Ōgetsu-hime/Ukemochi is married to Hayamato-no-Kami (羽山戸神), the son of Toshigami through his wife Amechikarumizu-hime (天知迦流美豆比売) in the Kojiki, making Hayamato her great-grandnephew through her brother Ōyamatsumi. In some legends, Ukemochi is also married to Inari Ōkami; in others, she is Inari.

According to the Kojiki, after Susanoo-no-Mikoto was banished from heaven, he asked Ōgetsu-hime to give him food, and she did so by producing various food items from her nose, mouth and rectum. Thinking that she had poisoned the food by doing this, Susanoo killed her. After she died, silkworms grew from her head, rice seeds grew from her eyes, millet grew from her ear, azuki grew from her nose, wheat grew from her genitals, and soybeans from her rectum. After her death, one of the three primordial creator deities, Kamimusubi, took seeds from her body and planted them in the ground.

Another version of the myth features Ōgetsu-hime by her more common name, Ukemochi. In this version, the moon god Tsukuyomi visits her on behalf of his sister-wife, the sun goddess Amaterasu. Ukemochi sought to entertain him and prepared a feast. First, she faced the land, opened her mouth, and boiled rice came out. Next, she faced the ocean and spat out fish and edible seaweed, then she faced the forest and bountiful game spewed out of her mouth. She prepared the food and served it to Tsukuyomi-no-Mikoto, but he was so disgusted by how she had produced the food and thought she had disrespected him and made the food impure. Feeling offended by the slight from the lesser deity, he killed her and returned to heaven. Her dead body produced both food and animals: cattle and horses came from her head, silkworms came from her eyebrows, millet came from her forehead, and a rice plant sprouted from her stomach. While different sources mention similar items that came from Ukemochi's body, from which part of her body these items came from is less agreed upon.

It is believed that this version of Ukemochi's death explained why the sun and the moon are not seen together as the sun goddess, Amaterasu, who heard of Ukemochi's passing, never wanted to meet her killer, the moon god Tsukuyomi, again, or that Tsukuyomi hid during the day out of fear of Amaterasu's wrath.

In addition, in a legend passed down in Iwami district in Shimane Prefecture, her daughter, Otogosa-hime (乙子狭姫), rode on a red goose and descended to sow the seeds of the crops. Otogosa-hime could get food from any part of her body.

Ukemochi, Inari, and Toyouke-hime are connected. For example, Ukemochi is also called Wakaukanome, who is enshrined at Hirose Taisha, and connected to or identical with Toyouke-hime. She is also linked with or identical to Inari.

== See also ==
- Annapurna; the Indian Hindu goddess of food.
- Dema deity
- Hainuwele
- Toyouke-hime
