= Atago =

Atago may refer to:

- Atago Gongen, a Japanese kami

== Places in Japan ==
- Atago, Tokyo, a district of Minato, Tokyo
  - Atago Shrine (Tokyo), in Minato, Tokyo
  - Atago Green Hills, an urban complex located in Atago
- Mount Atago, a mountain in Kyoto, Japan
  - Atago Shrine (Kyoto), a shrine on Mount Atago
- Mount Atago (Minamibōsō, Chiba), a mountain in Chiba Prefecture
- Atago Station (Chiba), a train station in Noda, Chiba Prefecture
- Atago Station (Miyagi), a train station in Matsushima, Miyagi Prefecture

== People ==
- Kokone Atago (愛宕 心響; born 2005), Japanese member of the Nogizaka46

== Ships ==
- Japanese gunboat Atago, of the early Imperial Japanese Navy
- Japanese cruiser Atago, of the Imperial Japanese Navy
- Japanese battlecruiser Atago, a projected Amagi-class battlecruiser of the Imperial Japanese Navy that was canceled under the terms of Washington Naval Treaty
- Atago-class destroyer, of the Japan Maritime Self-Defense Force
- JS Atago, an Atago-class guided missile destroyer in the Japan Maritime Self-Defense Force
- Atago Maru, a merchant ship built in Glasgow in 1924 by Lithgows & Sons
