= Tsukinowa-dera =

Buddhist temple in Kyoto, Japan

Coordinates: 35°03′30″N 135°38′44″E

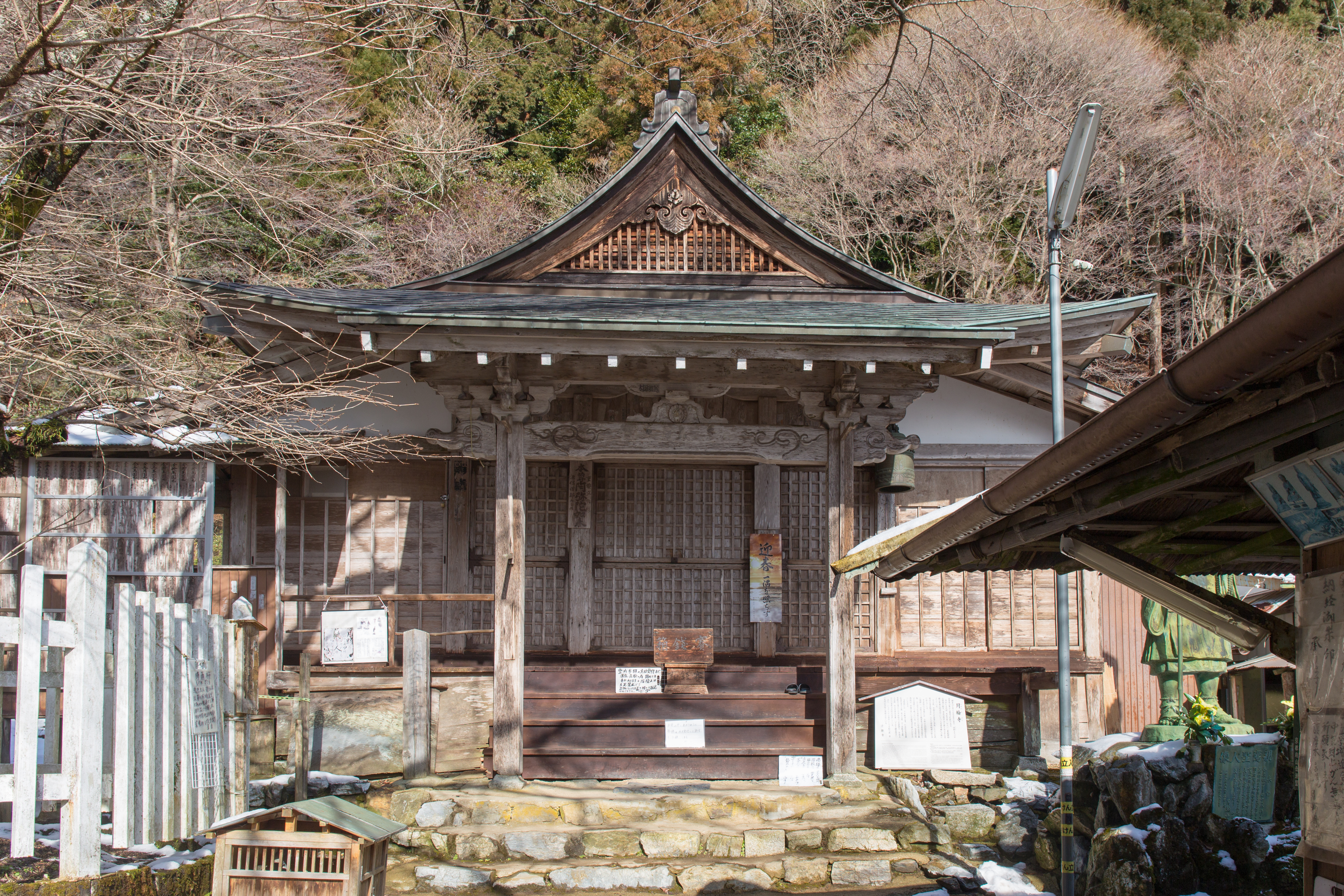
Tsukinowadera

Tsukinowa-dera or Gatsurin-ji (月輪寺) is a Buddhist temple near Mount Atago in Ukyō-ku, Kyoto, Japan. The temple was first founded in 781, it is associated with the Shugendō practices of Kūya and Hōnen. Its treasures include eight Heian period statues. Images of Amida Nyorai and Kūya chanting the nembutsu are amongst those designated Important Cultural Properties.

== See also ==
- List of Buddhist temples in Kyoto
- Atago Jinja
