= NBCUniversal Entertainment Japan =

Japanese entertainment company

NBCUniversal Entertainment Japan LLC
- Logo used as of 2021

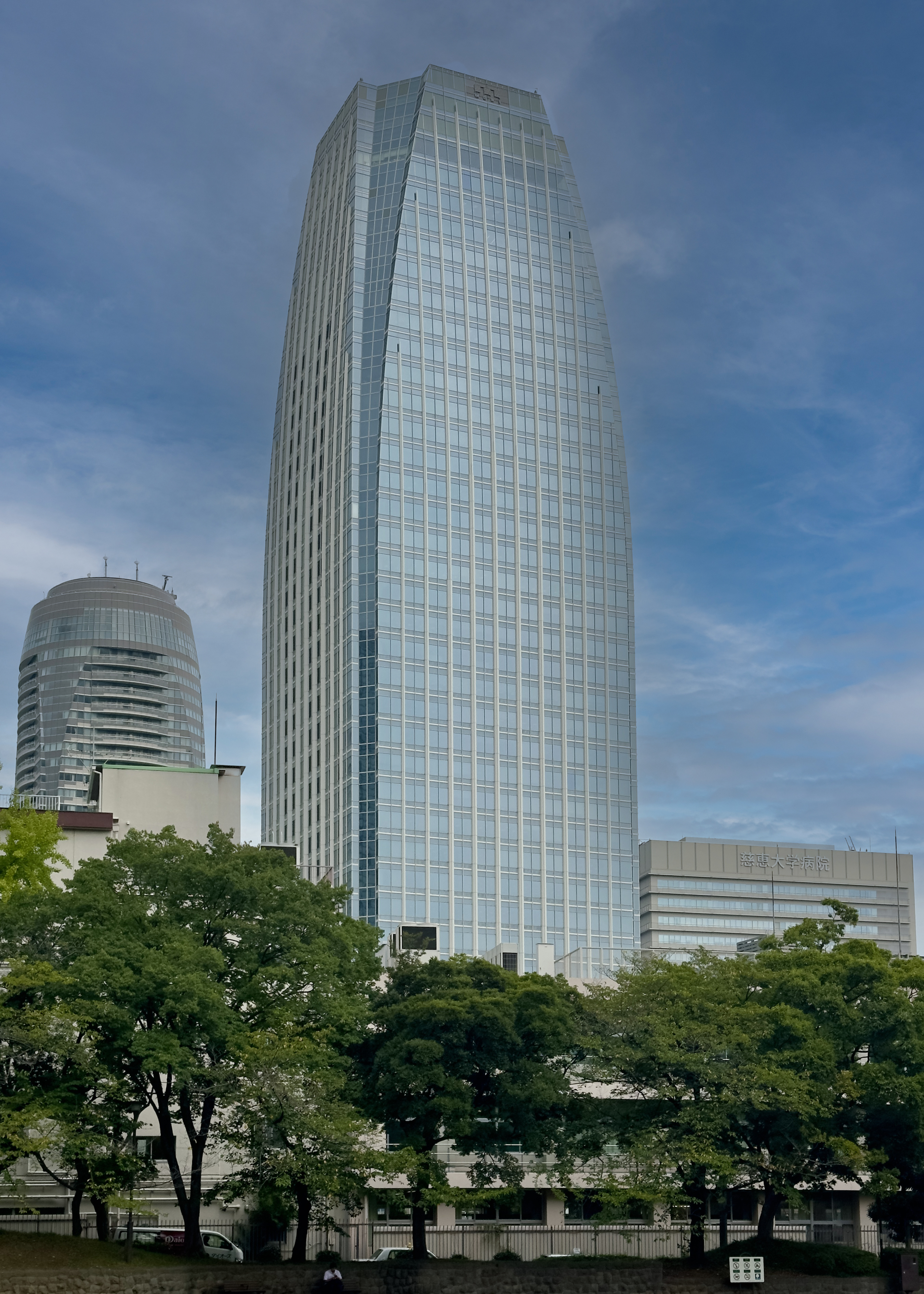
- Headquarters at Atago Green Hills in Atago, Minato, Tokyo
- Native name: NBCユニバーサル・エンターテイメントジャパン合同会社
- Romanized name: EnubīshīYunibāsaru Entāteimento Japan gōdō gaisha
- Formerly: LaserDisc Corporation (1981–1989); Pioneer LDC, Inc. (1989–2003); Geneon Entertainment Inc. (2003–2009); Geneon Universal Entertainment Japan, LLC. (2009–2013)
- Type: Subsidiary
- Industry: Mass media
- Founded: March 1981; 45 years ago
- Founder: Pioneer Corporation
- Headquarters: Atago, Minato, Tokyo, Japan
- Area served: Japan
- Key people: Shoji Doyama (CEO and president)
- Products: Anime; Film; Music
- Services: Licensing; Publishing
- Owner: NBCUniversal (Comcast)
- Parent: Pioneer Corporation (1981–2003); Dentsu (2003–2008); Universal Pictures (2008–present)
- Website: www.nbcuni.co.jp

NBCUniversal Entertainment Japan LLC (Japanese: NBCユニバーサル・エンターテイメントジャパン合同会社, Hepburn: Enubīshī Yunibāsaru Entāteimento Japan Gōdō gaisha) (abbreviated as NBCUEJ) is a Japanese animation studio and mass media company that is a Japanese subsidiary of NBCUniversal, owned by American telecommunications/media company Comcast headquartered in Akasaka, Minato, Tokyo. It is primarily involved in the production and distribution of anime within Japan.

The company was founded in March 1981 by Pioneer Corporation as LaserDisc Corporation, a LaserDisc player production company. In 1989, the company was renamed Pioneer LDC, Inc. as it branched into the anime, music, and film industries, and later Geneon Entertainment Inc. (after being acquired by Dentsu in 2003). In 2008, Geneon merged with Universal Pictures Japan to form Geneon Universal Entertainment Japan, LLC; in 2013, the company changed its name to the current NBCUniversal Entertainment Japan. Some of the well-known anime series the company has produced are A Certain Magical Index, The Heroic Legend of Arslan, Danganronpa: The Animation, Golden Kamuy, Seraph of the End, and Is the Order a Rabbit? among many others.

Despite the name, NBCUniversal Entertainment Japan does not distribute Universal Pictures films theatrically in Japan; Toho (through Toho-Towa) exclusively distributes them for Japanese theaters.

== History ==
Evolution of Comcast
- 1909: Independent Moving Pictures was founded by Carl Laemmle as the predecessor to Universal
- 1912: Universal Studios Hollywood was founded after Independent Moving merged with several smaller film studios
- 1915: Universal City, California, was established as the entertainment district for the Universal Studios Lot.
- 1924: MCA Inc. was founded by Jules Stein as a talent agency to book musicians
- 1926: RCA Corporation launched the NBC Radio Network, and by 1939, NBC began broadcasting on television.
- 1934: Decca Records America was established and would later grow to become Universal Music Group
- 1946: William Goetz and Leo Spitz began managing Universal Pictures, after merging International Pictures
- 1952: Decca Records America acquired a controlling stake in Universal Pictures
- 1958: MCA acquired the Universal Studios film lot and later purchased Decca Records America, and Universal Pictures in 1962
- 1963: Comcast was founded as American Cable Systems by Ralph J. Roberts
- 1973: Decca Records America is retired as a brand and renamed to MCA Records
- 1986: General Electric acquired RCA Corp and dissolved the company while retaining ownership of NBC
- 1990: Panasonic acquired a Controlling interest in MCA, but sold it to Seagram within five years after growing costs
- 1998: MCA Records acquired Polygram N.V. from Philips and was renamed to Universal Music Group
- 2000: Seagram Entertainment was sold to Vivendi and merged with StudioCanal to become Vivendi Universal
- 2002: NBC acquired Telemundo while Comcast acquired AT&T Broadband
- 2004: Vivendi Universal was consolidated with General Electric's wholly owned NBC to form NBCUniversal, while Universal Music Group was separated
- 2013: Comcast closed its acquisition of NBCUniversal from General Electric
- 2018: Sky Group was acquired from 21st Century Fox after a bidding war
- 2020: Peacock was launched
- 2026: Majority of NBCU's cable networks were spun off into another company named Versant, while Comcast later announced it would spin-off NBCUniversal and Sky into a separate company

=== Founding ===
Pioneer Corporation founded the LaserDisc Corporation (レーザーディスク株式会社, RēzāDisuku Kabushiki-gaisha) in March 1981 to produce LaserDisc players in Japan. The LaserDisc Corporation changed its name to Pioneer LDC, Inc. (パイオニア エル・ディー・シー株式会社, Paionia Eru Dī Shī Kabushiki-gaisha) in 1989 as part of an attempt to branch off into the anime, film, and music industries. As Pioneer LDC, they developed and published several video games for the Sega Saturn and PlayStation, such as games based on Magical Girl Pretty Sammy, Tenchi Muyo!, and Serial Experiments Lain.

In December 1985, Pioneer LDC made an effort to expand into the North American business, by establishing a subsidiary in the region named LaserDisc Corporation of America in an effort to consolidate the Pioneer Video and Pioneer Audio units, who maintained the Pioneer Artists label, which was initially based near New Jersey, following the introduction of a combined CD/laserdisc player.

In late 1991, Pioneer LDC established a European division, Pioneer LDCE (short for LaserDisc Corporation of Europe), hoping to revive interest of Laserdiscs in the European market after Philips' Laserdisc players flopped in Europe. Around the same time, the company begin licensing titles from Guild Film Distribution to release 140 films to Laserdisc for the United Kingdom market, and additionally licensed titles from VCL Communications/Carolco Pictures to release 20 titles to the German market.

In 1992, LaserDisc released their first anime title Tenchi Muyo! Ryo-Ohki.

Former logo for Geneon Entertainment from October 2003 to February 1, 2009

On July 21, 2003, the company was acquired by Japanese advertising and marketing company firm Dentsu and renamed to Geneon Entertainment Inc. (ジェネオン エンタテインメント株式会社, Jeneon Entateinmento Kabushiki-gaisha), while its North American division, Pioneer Entertainment, was renamed Geneon USA.

=== Sale to NBC Universal ===
Logo of Geneon Universal Entertainment Japan, featuring the Universal Pictures logo (used from 1996 to 2011), used from 2009 to 2013

On November 12, 2008, Dentsu announced that it was selling 80.1% of its ownership in the company to NBC Universal's Universal Pictures International Entertainment (UPIE), who planned to merge the company with its Universal Pictures Japan division—which had no longer theatrically distributed Universal Pictures films in Japan, having delegated its theatrical distribution tasks to Toho subsidiary Toho-Towa since the dissolution of United International Pictures Japan in 2007—to form a new company. The merger later closed, with the new company known as Geneon Universal Entertainment Japan, LLC. (ジェネオン・ユニバーサル・エンターテイメントジャパン合同会社, Jeneon Yunibāsaru Entāteimento Japan Gōdō-kaisha). On December 9, 2013, the company once again changed its name to NBCUniversal Entertainment Japan LLC.

Universal Pictures logo of NBCUniversal Entertainment Japan, used alongside the wordmark

On February 17, 2013, they made a partnership with Universal Sony Pictures Home Entertainment to distribute their anime titles directly in Australia and New Zealand.

=== Purchase of Paramount Japan ===
On January 1, 2016, Paramount Japan was purchased by NBCUniversal and dissolved shortly afterwards. This was due to Paramount Pictures establishing a joint-venture with Toho-Towa named Towa Pictures Company Limited, which would distribute Paramount's films in Japan.

On July 12, 2017, they announced a partnership with Crunchyroll to co-produce anime with "international appeal".

Since July 1, 2025, Happinet has been the exclusive manufacturer and seller of NBCUniversal Entertainment Japan's home video releases. Due to Happinet striking a similar deal with Paramount, NBCUEJ ended Japanese home video distribution of Paramount content the day prior.
