= JS Atago =

Atago-class guided missile destroyer

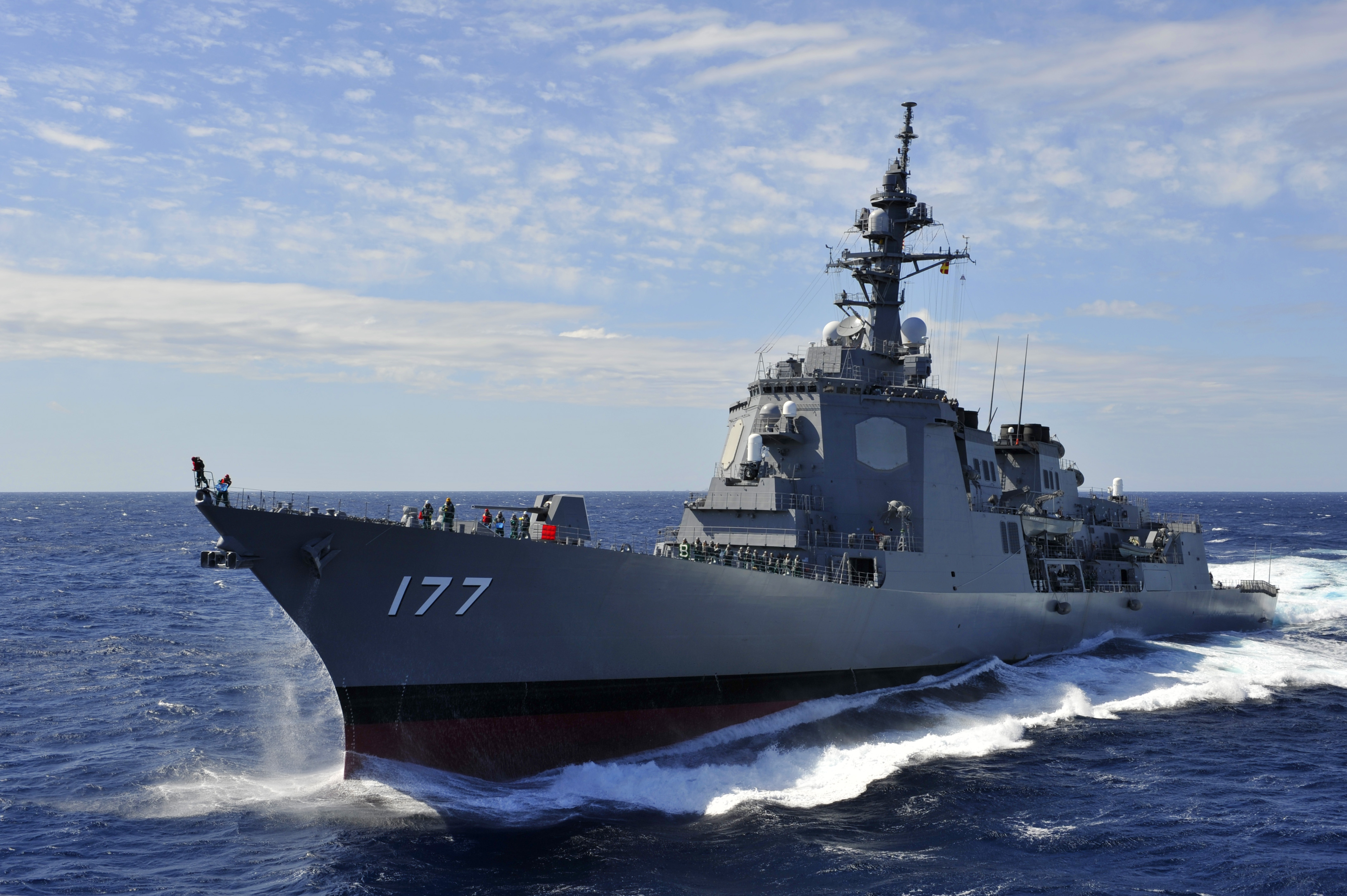
- JS Atago on 4 October 2012

History

Japan
- Name: Atago; (あたご)
- Namesake: Mount Atago
- Ordered: 2002
- Builder: Mitsubishi
- Laid down: 5 April 2004 in Nagasaki
- Launched: 24 August 2005
- Commissioned: 15 March 2007
- Home port: Maizuru
- Identification: MMSI number: 431999686; Pennant number: DDG-177
- Status: Active

General characteristics
- Class & type: Atago class destroyer
- Displacement: 7700 tons standard; 10,000+ tons full load
- Length: 560 ft (170 m)
- Beam: 68.9 ft (21.0 m)
- Draft: 20.3 ft (6.2 m)
- Propulsion: 4 Ishikawajima Harima/General Electric LM2500-30 gas turbines; two shafts, 100,000 shaft horsepower (75 MW)
- Speed: 30 knots (56 km/h)
- Range: 4,500 nautical miles at 20 knots; (8,334 km at 37 km/h)
- Complement: 300
- Sensors & processing systems: AN/SPY-1D(V)
- Armament: 1 × 5 inch (127mm/L62) Mk-45 Mod 4 naval gun in a stealth-shaped mount. (Made by Japan Steel Works licensed from its original manufacturer).; 2 × missile canister up to 8 Type 90 (SSM-1B); 2 × 20 mm Phalanx CIWS; 2 × Type 68 triple torpedo tubes (6 × Mk-46 or Type 73 torpedoes); 96-cell Mk-41 VLS (64 at the bow / 32 cells at the stern aft) for a mix of: SM-2MR Standard Missile; SM-3 Anti-Ballistic Missile; RUM-139 Vertical Launch ASROC (Anti-Submarine); RIM-162 Evolved Sea Sparrow
- Aircraft carried: 1 x SH-60K helicopter

JS Atago (DDG-177), あたご (A-ta-go), is the lead ship of her class of guided missile destroyer in the Japan Maritime Self-Defense Force (JMSDF). She was named after Mount Atago. She was laid down by Mitsubishi Heavy Industries in Nagasaki on April 5, 2004. Launching ceremony happened on August 24, 2005 and she was commissioned on March 15, 2007.

== Deployments ==
JS Atago took part in RIMPAC 2010 held in Hawaii.

On February 19 (JST, February 18-UTC), 2008, Atago collided with and destroyed a civil fishing boat. Two fishermen were missing, and they have not been found. Two of Atago's crewmen, who had been prosecuted with the charges of professional negligence after the accident, were found not guilty.

== Gallery ==
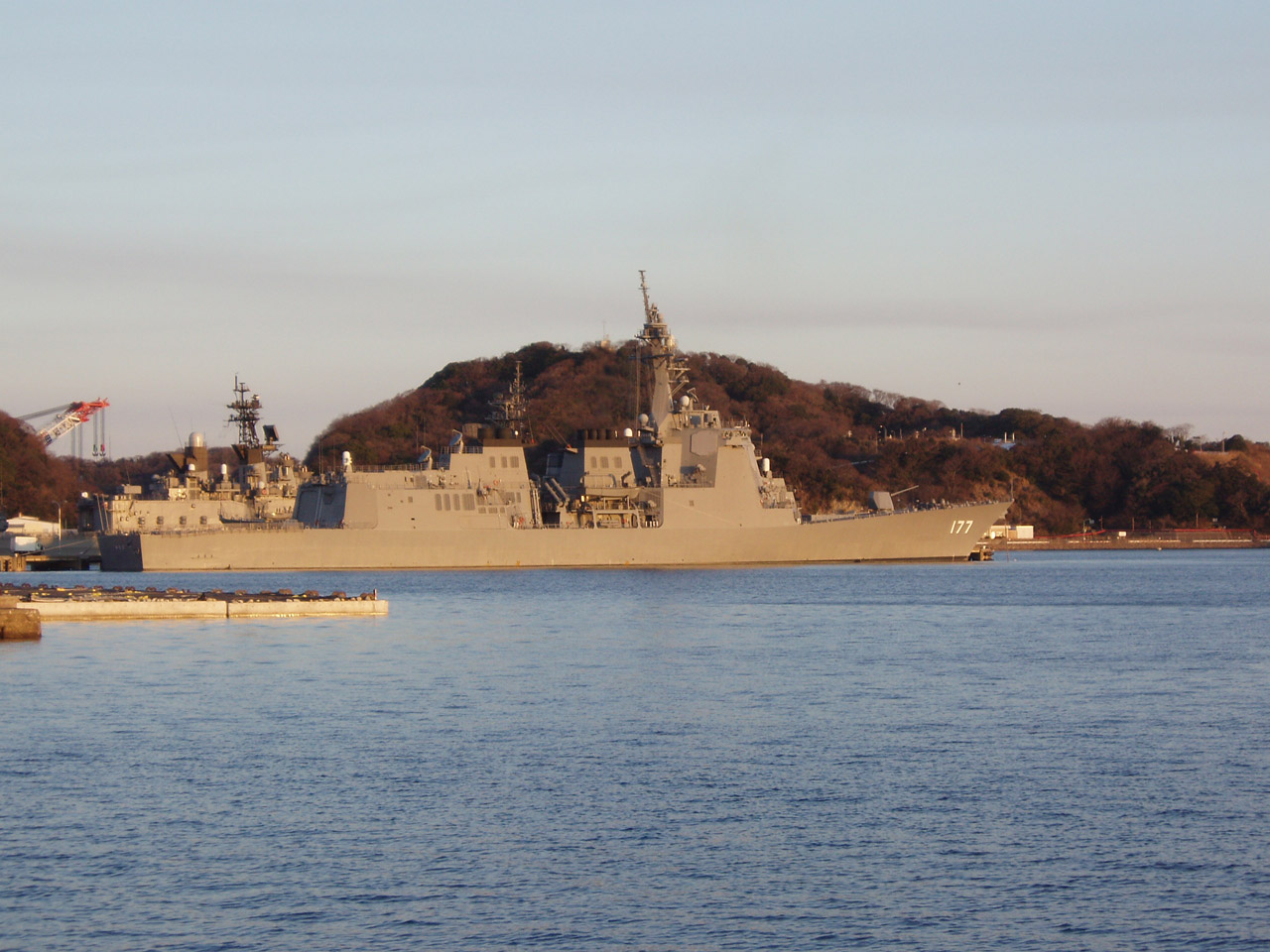
JS Atago on 24 February 2008

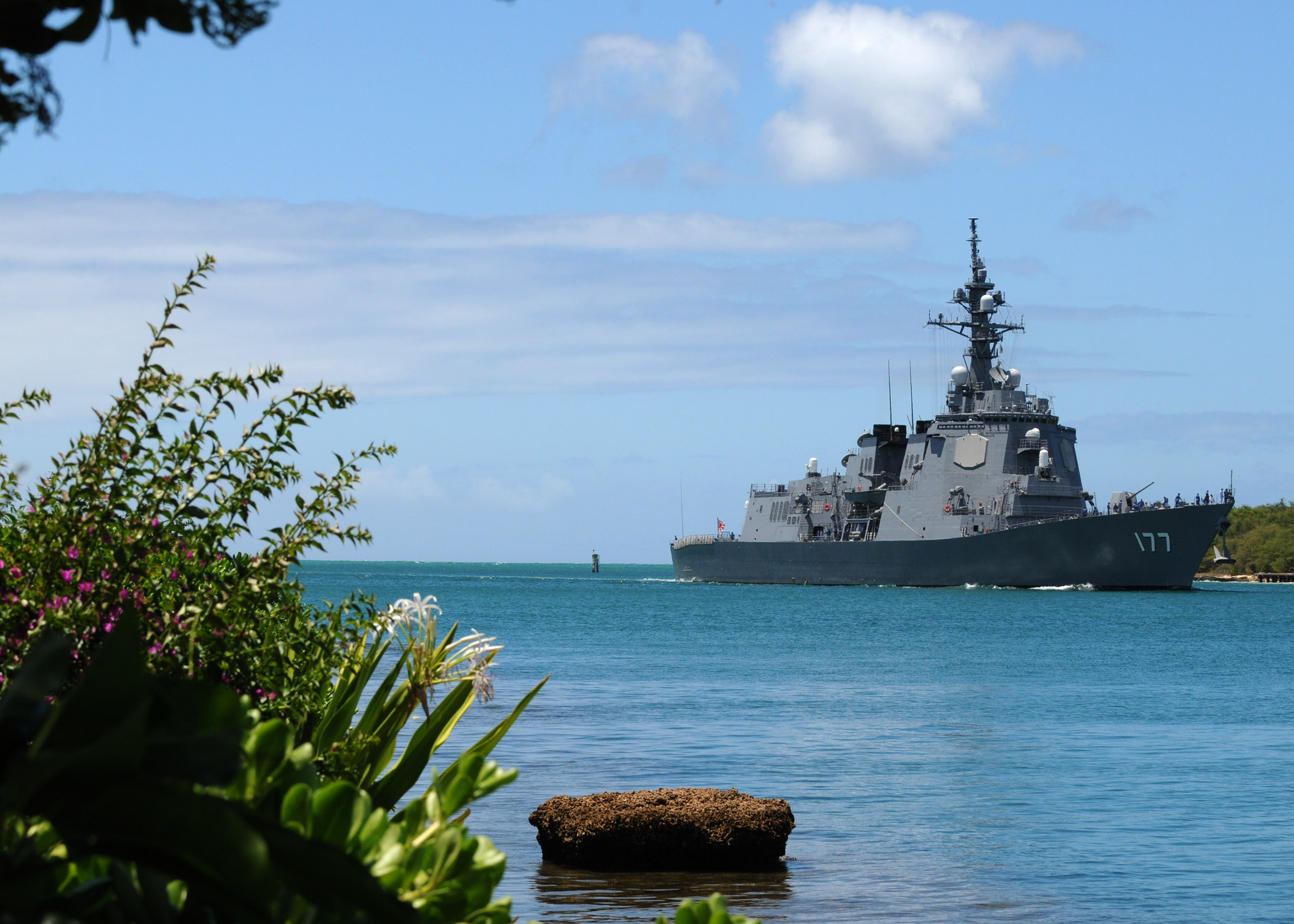
JS Atago returns to Pearl Harbor after participating in RIMPAC 2010

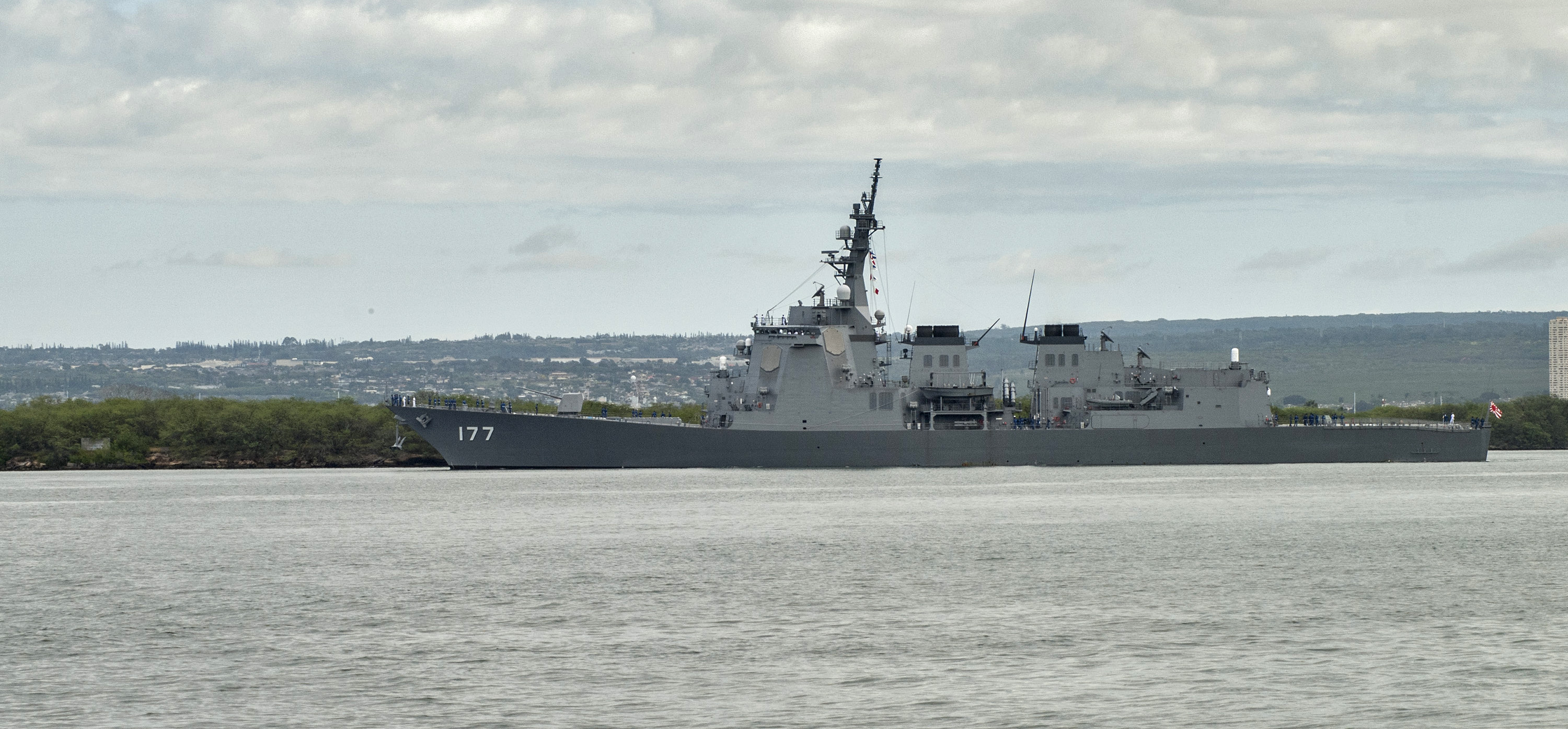
JS Atago leaves Pearl Harbor for San Diego, 20 May 2013

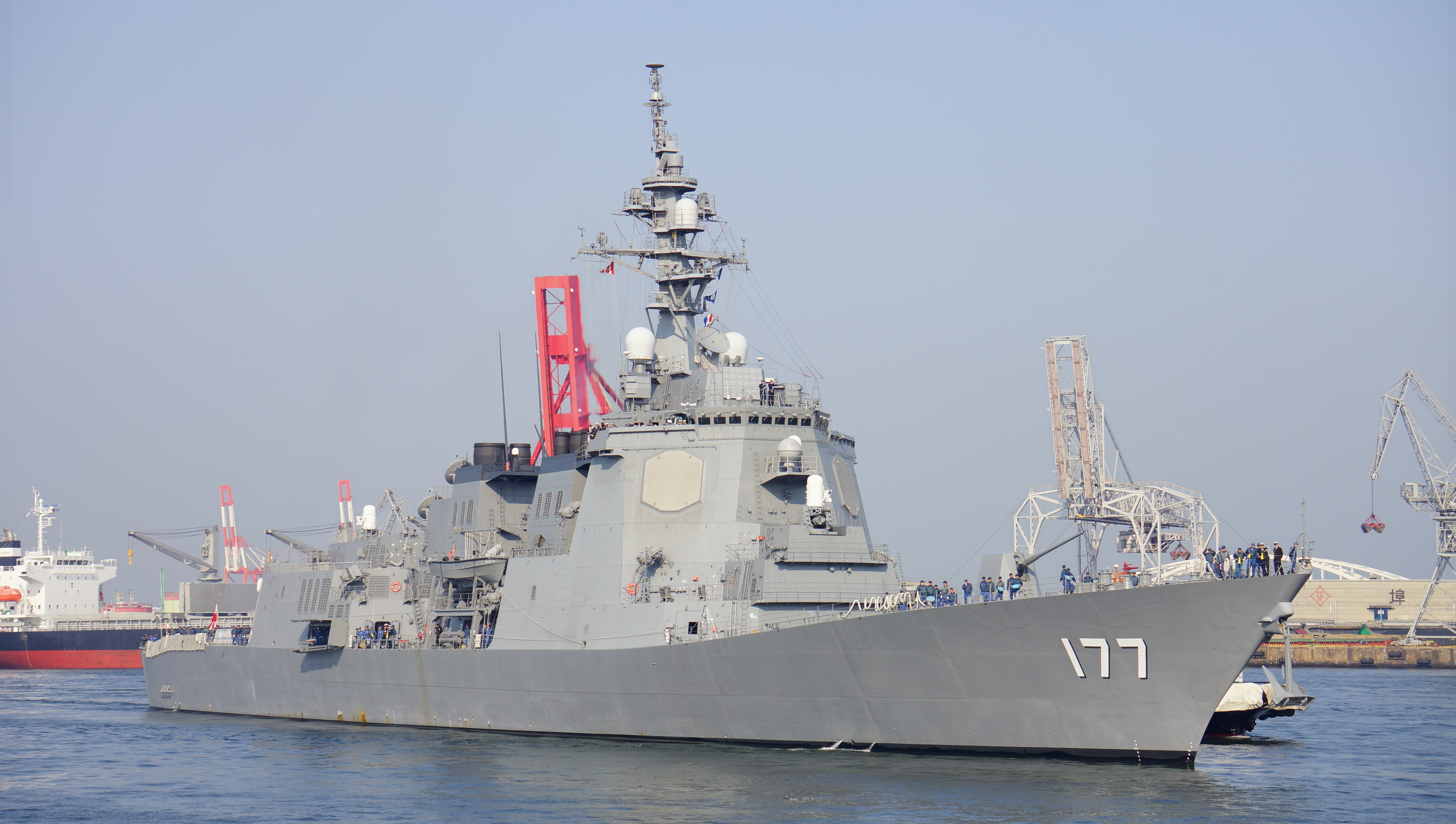
JS Atago on 26 April 2014

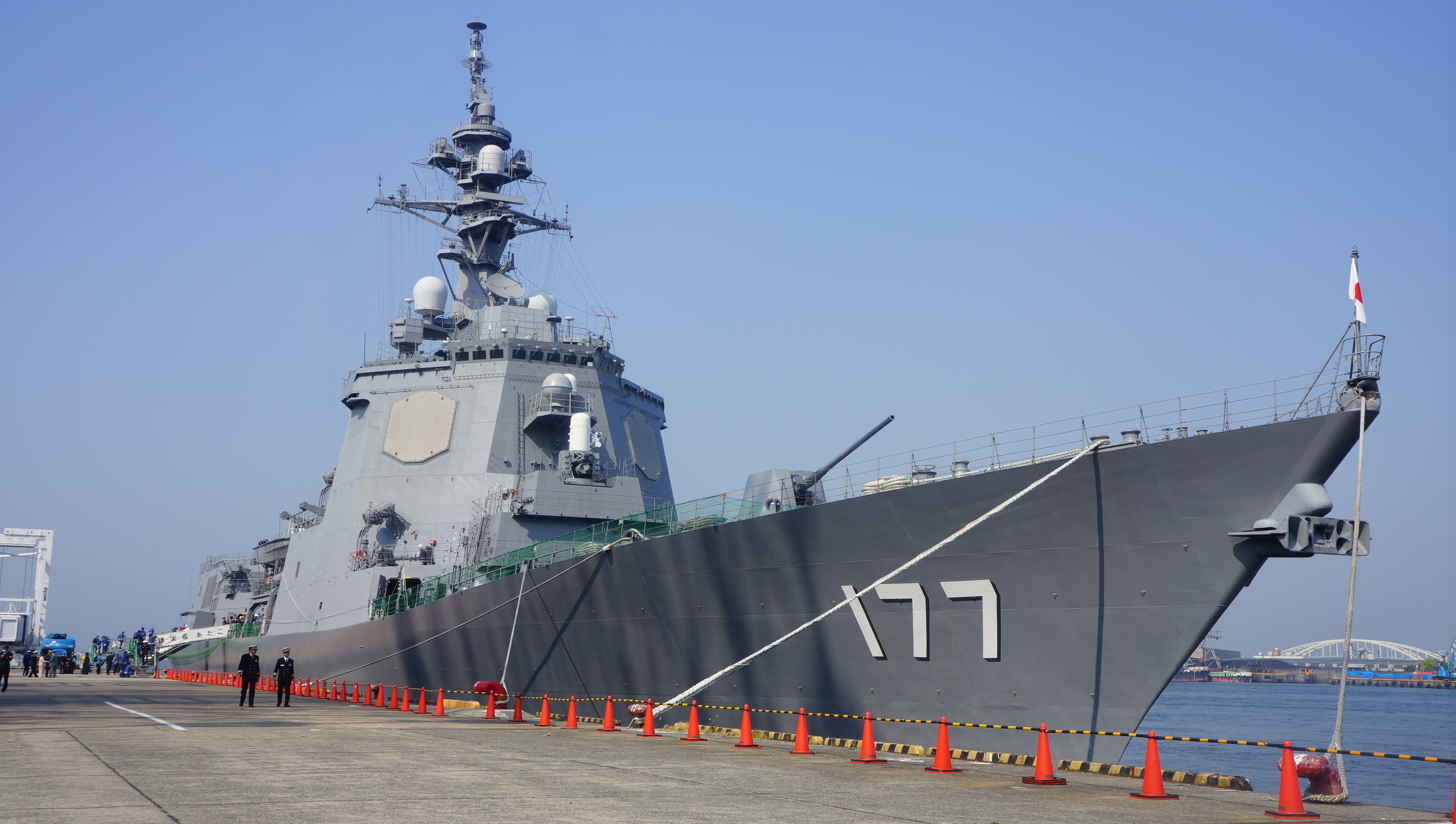

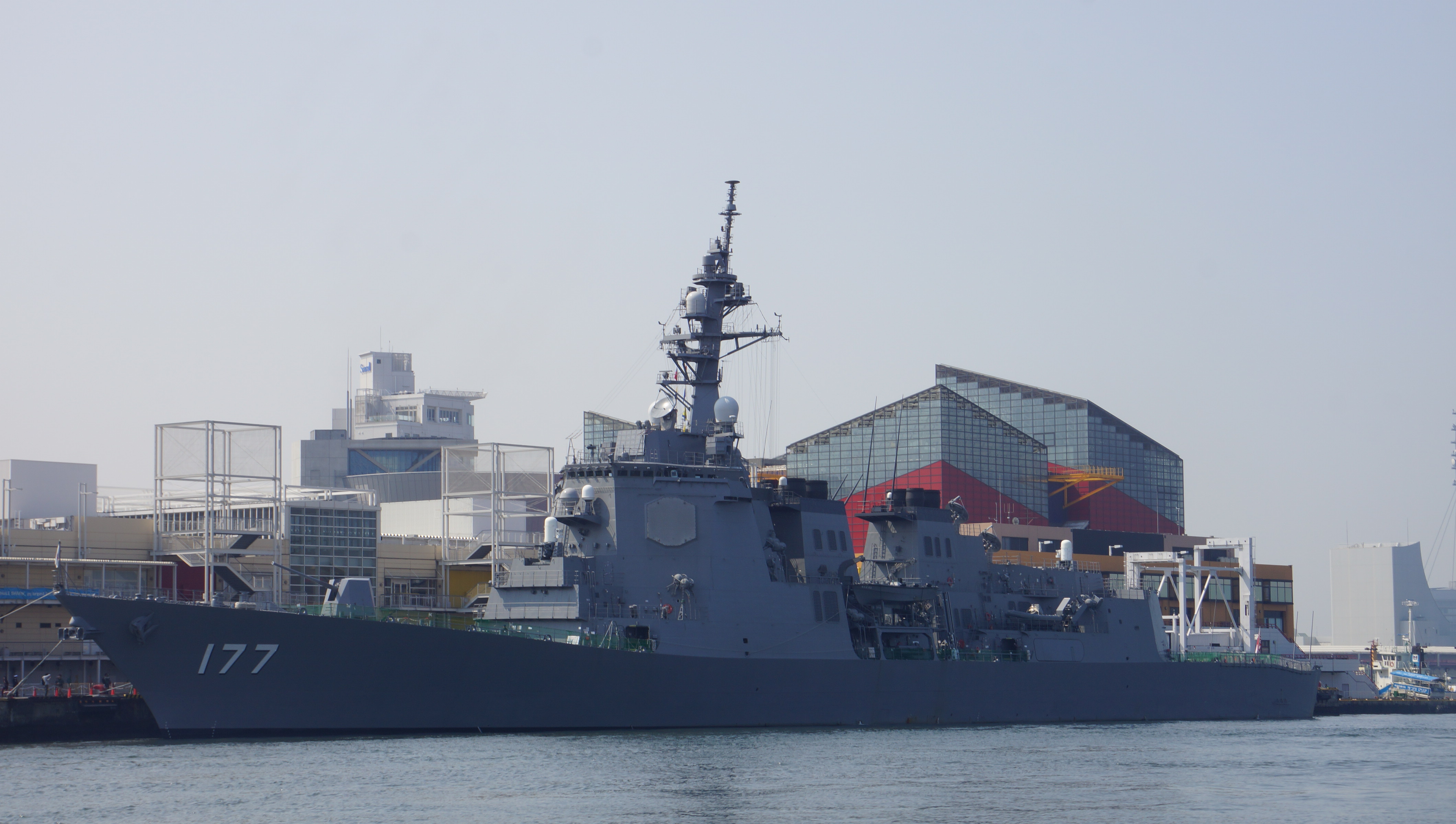

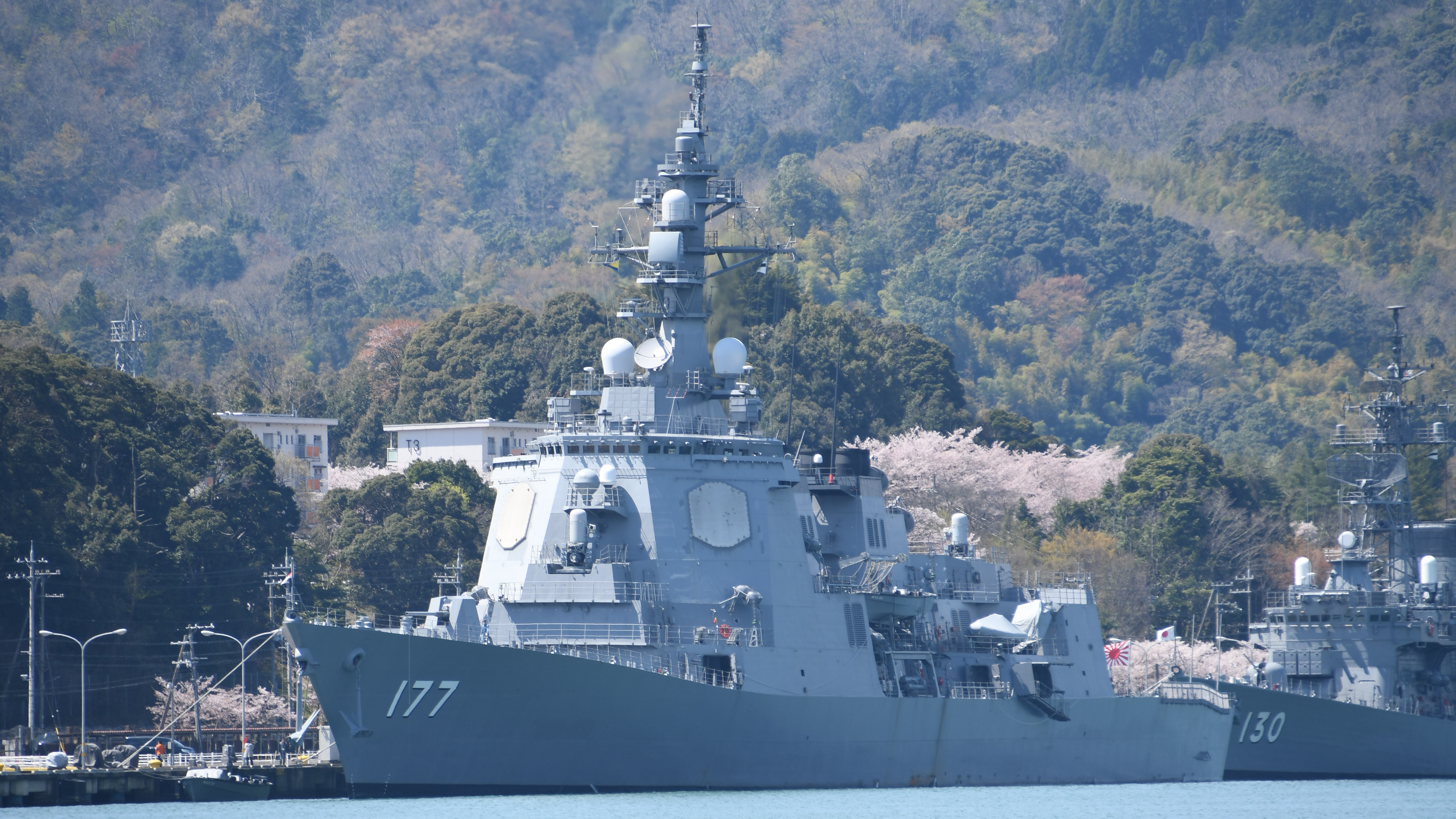
JS Atago in Maizuru on 13 April 2019

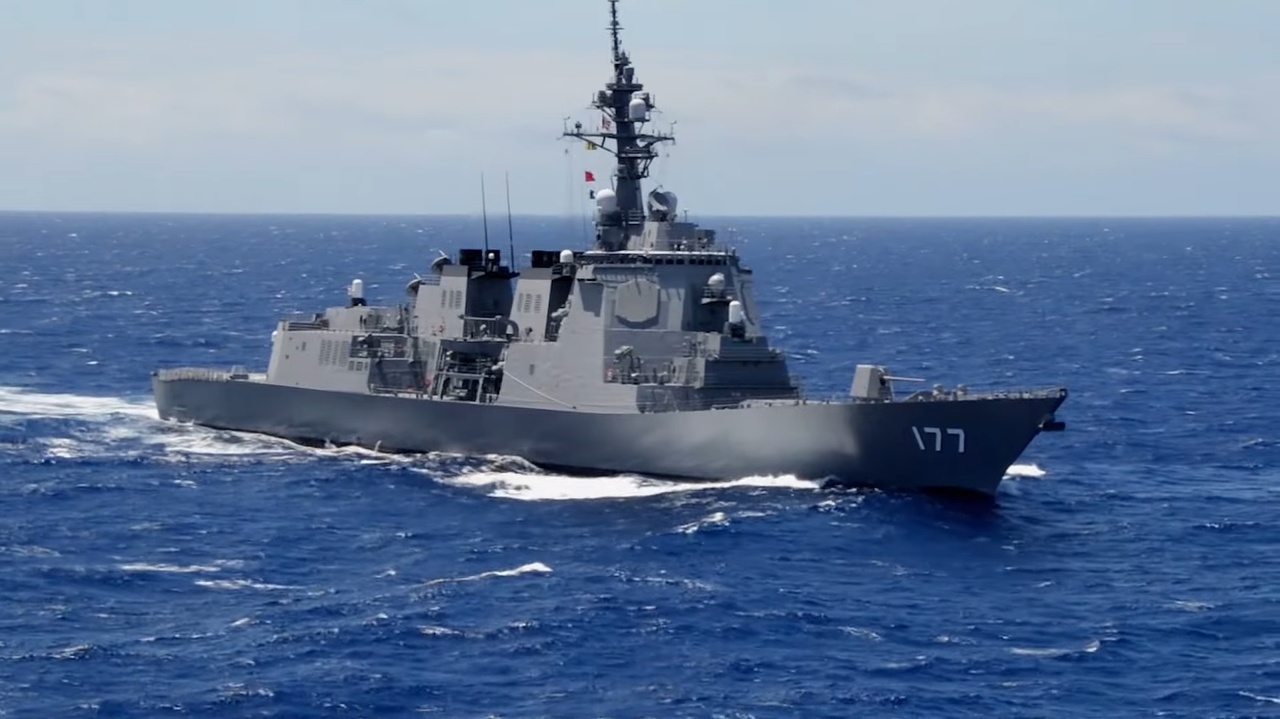
JS Atago underway, 18 January 2021

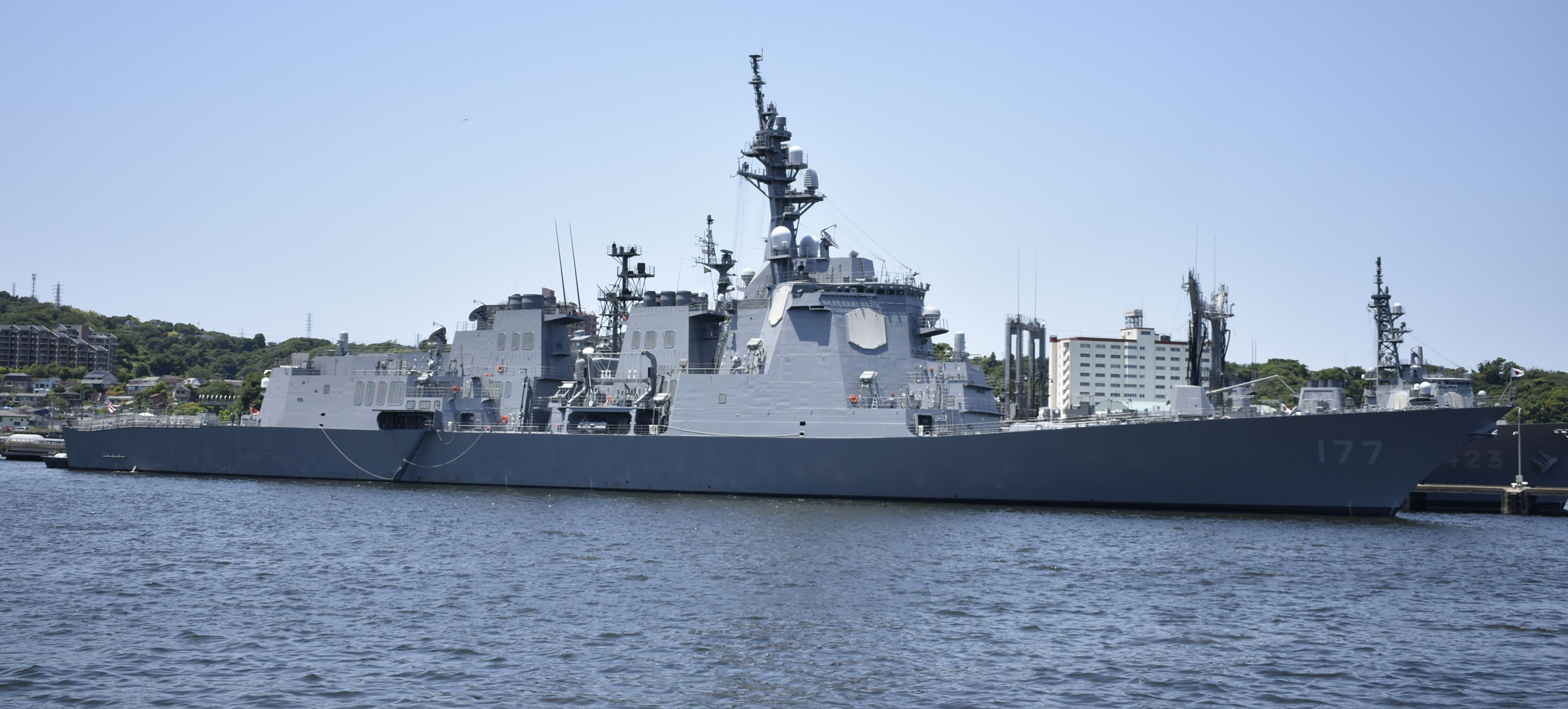
JS Atago docked, 24 May 2022

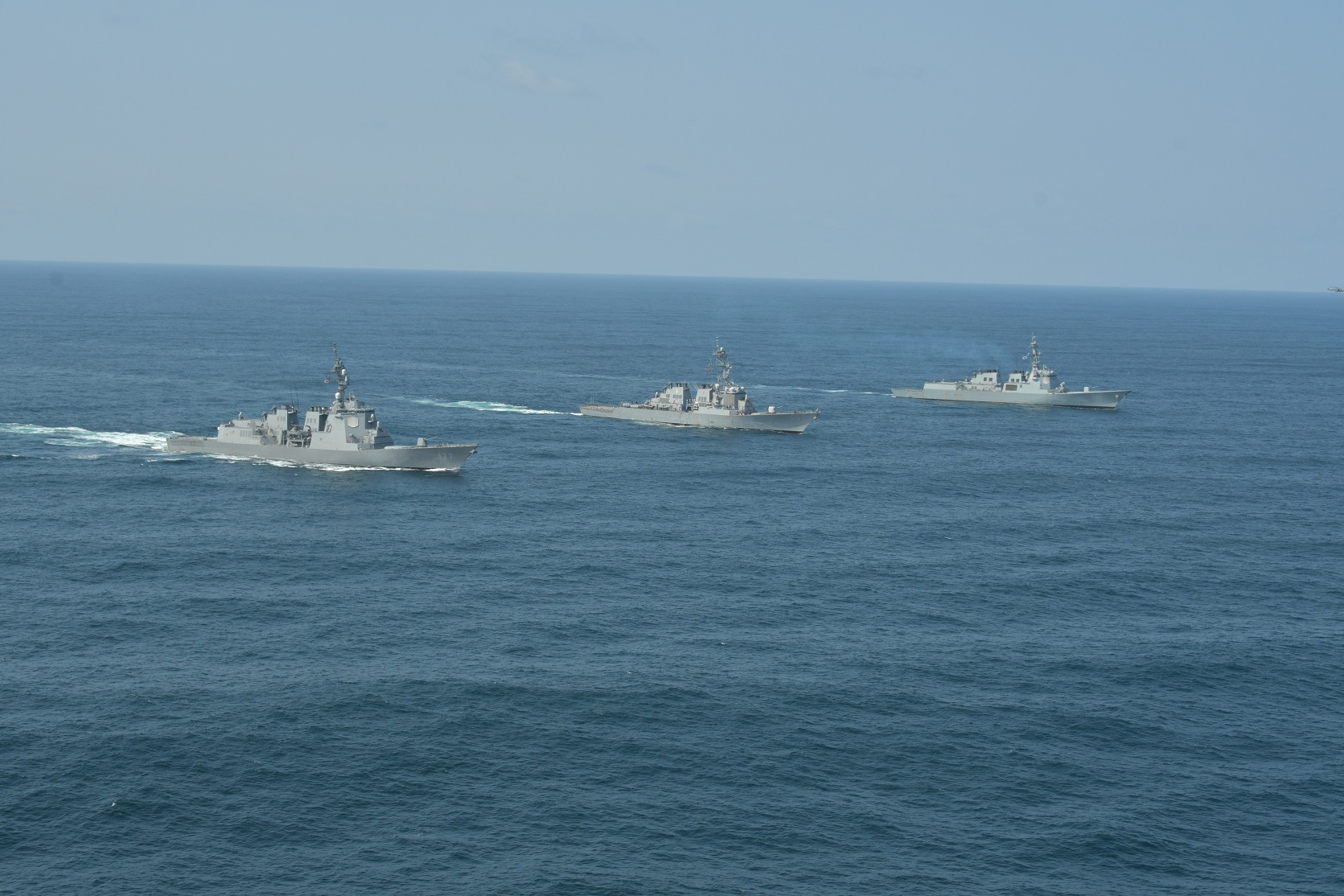
JS Atago with USS Benfold and ROKS Yulgok Yi I during a ballistic missile information sharing exercise in the Sea of Japan, 17 April 2023
