= Atago Gongen =

Shugendō deity

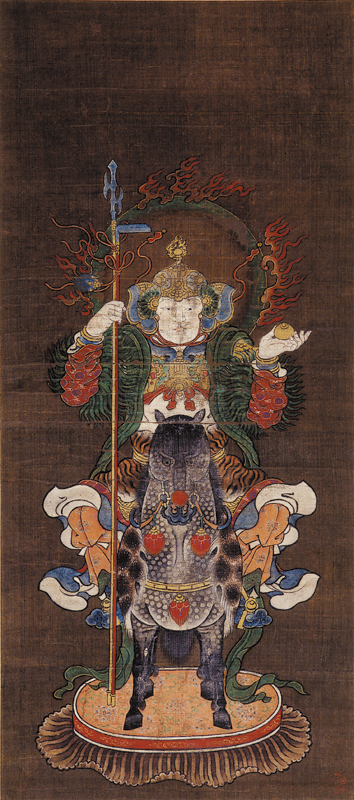
- Atago Gongen by Hasegawa Tohaku (Ishikawa Nanao Art Museum)

Creature information
- Other name(s): Atago Daigongen, Tarōbō tengu and Shōgun Jizō
- Grouping: Legendary creatures
- Sub grouping: Tengu

Origin
- Country: Japan
- Habitat: Mount Atago

Atago Gongen (愛宕権現) also known as Tarōbō (太郎坊), Atago Daigongen (愛宕大権現), Shōgun Jizō (勝軍地蔵) of Mount Atago is a Japanese kami and tengu believed to be the local avatar (Gongen) of Buddhist bodhisattva Jizō and Shinto goddess Izanami. He is mounted on a white horse and carries a ringed staff and desire-cancelling jewel. The cult originated in Shugendō practices on Mount Atago in Kyoto, and Atago Gongen is worshiped as a protector against fire and a god of war and victory by Samurai. There are some nine hundred Atago Shrines around Japan.

== Legends ==
Mount Atago was said to be infested by tengu during the reign of Emperor Monmu. One of the tengu was a particularly powerful one named Tarōbō. The sages En no Gyōja and Taichō were charged with clearing the mountain. When Tarōbō surrendered to them, he became protector of the mountain. He is often seen as the guardian or an avatar of Jizō as a result.

Atago Gongen is the name of a deity resulting from a fusion of Shinto and Buddhist beliefs, specifically combining the worship in Mt. Atago and Shugendō beliefs. The faith in Jizō Bodhisattva is considered to be the original Buddhist belief with Izanami as its patron deity.

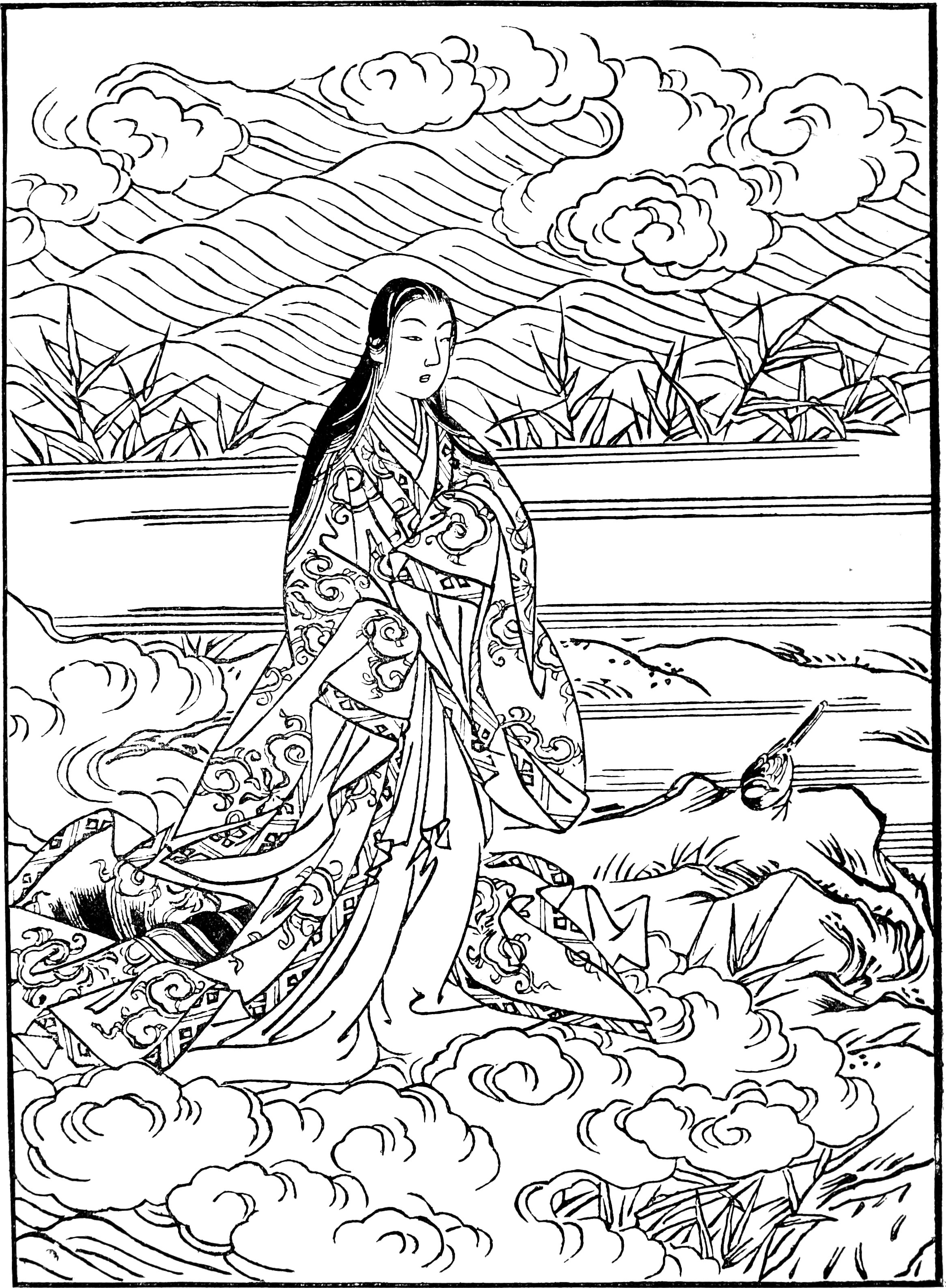
Izanami was identified with Jizō and Atago Gongen at Mt Atago during the Edo period.

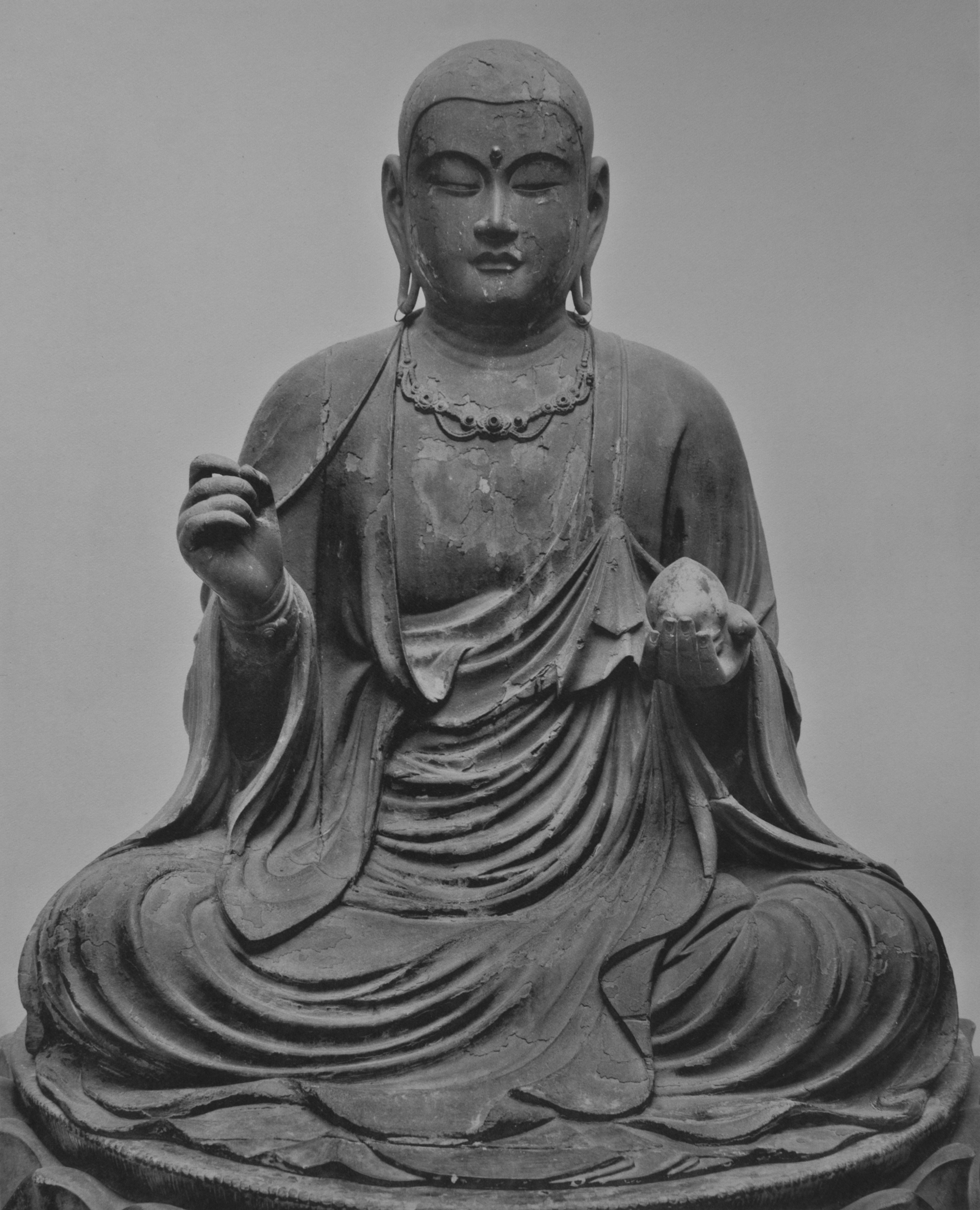
Jizō bodhisattva statue by Unkei. Rokuharamitsu-ji temple. 12th century. Japan.

The Hakuun-ji Temple located in Mt. Atago reached its peak prosperity during the Middle Ages, with its main shrine enshrining Izanami and Katsugun Jizō, the Okuin shrine enshrining Taroubou, and the Tendai shrine enshrining Katsuji-incho Tokobo, Kyogakuin Ozaki-bo, and Daizen.

Mt. Atago is considered to be one of the seven "high mountains" of the Shugendō faith, and Mt. Atago flourished as an ascetic dojo to the extent that it is said to be worth "seven times more than Ise, three times more than the Kumano Kodō, and as valuable as the moon is to Mt. Atago". As the combined faith in Mt. Atago and Shugendō became more and more popular in the Edo period, more shrines dedicated to the faith were built all over Japan.

Due to the influence of Onmyodo and the faith in the Kunado-no-Kami (local Japanese gods connected to protection from natural disasters and malicious spirits), Mt. Atago itself came to be considered a guardian deity in the northwest regions of Kyoto. Mt. Atago was worshipped as a deity of wildfire and theft protection, but this belief later merged with the principles of the Shogun Jizō belief, resulting in the creation of the deity Atago Gongen.

At the time, faith in the Tengū was popular as well, resulting in Atago Gongen being worshipped by some as 'Taroubou', according to sources such as Fujiwara no Yorinaga's diary, the Daiki. Taroubou is said in some sources to have been related to Shinto deities the likes of Amaterasu, Tsukuyomi, Hiruko, and Susanoo.

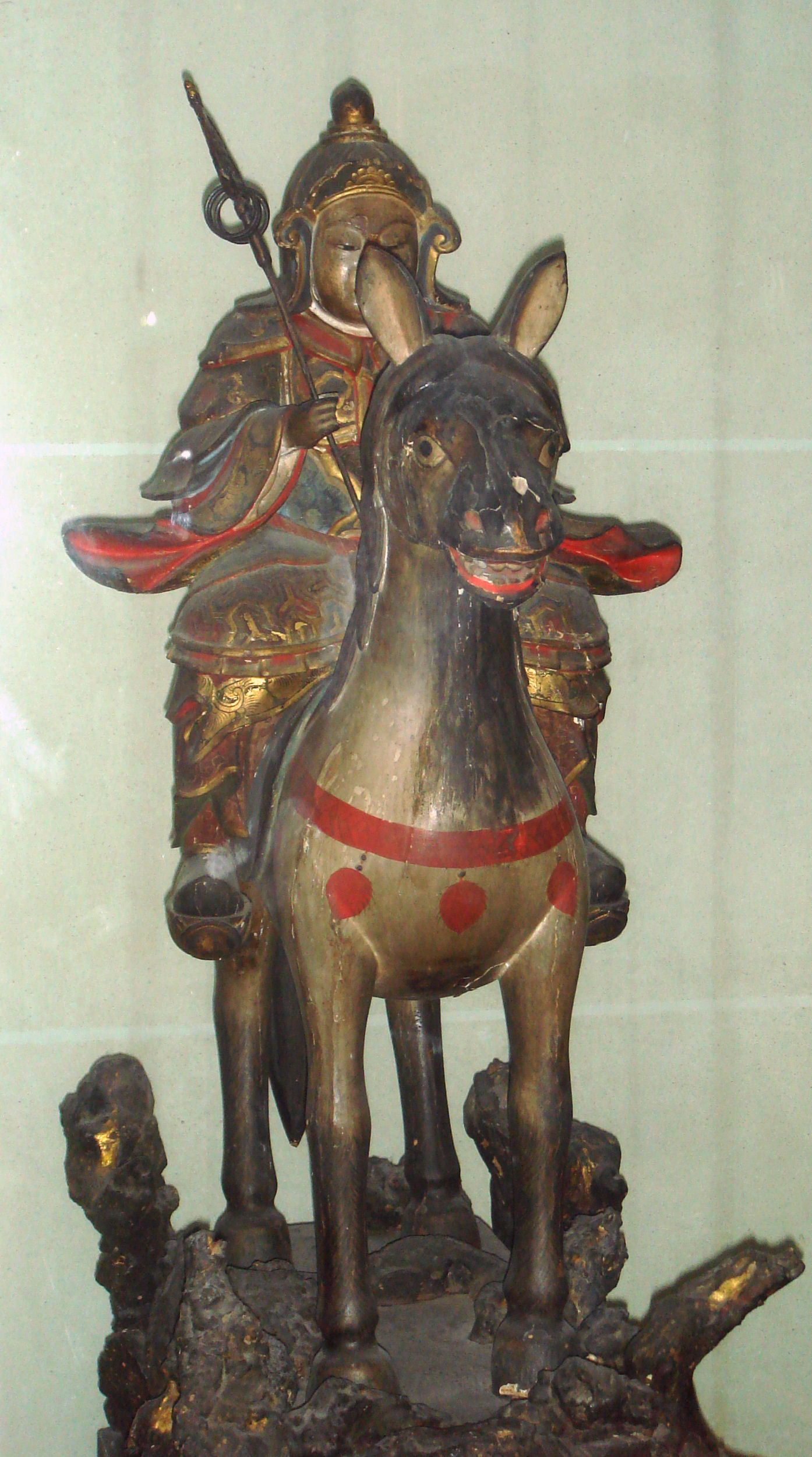
Statue of Atago Gongen, Musée Guimet

The faith in Atago Gongen began to diminish due to the revision and removal of Buddhist beliefs and ideology via the Ordinance for the Separation of Shinto and Buddhism in 1868. In the 1870s, many temples and shrines dedicated to Atago Gongen were forcibly shut down or abandoned. Nowadays, the shrines that were once dedicated to Atago Gongen now enshrine deities of the Shinto faith.

Like Sōjōbō, these tengu are daitengu, chieftains of a tengu mountain, and appear in different forms of Japanese art. Kimbrough says that in one version of the Heike monogatari, the tengu Tarōbō is described as the greatest tengu in Japan. In the text Gempei Seisuiki, Tarōbō is described as the first of the great tengu.

Says the Flammarion Iconographic Guide: "In certain cases, Jizō may also assume a syncretic aspect, and be represented as a warrior when assimilated with Atago Gongen, a Kami considered to be a temporary incarnation of Jizō. This kami (Shintō deity), protector from flame and fire, mainly venerated on Mount Atago in Kyoto Prefecture, has also been identified as being Kagutsuchi or even Susanoo-no-Mikoto and sometimes even as Izanagi. He is represented with the features of a Chinese warrior on horseback, carrying a pilgrim's staff and a cintamani. Popular imagery sometimes also symbolizes him by statuettes of a horse carrying a cintamani on its back. The support animal or messenger of this Atago Gongen is the wild boar, the symbol of courage, strength, and perseverance. Many legends relate that warriors in difficulty have been rescued by wild boars or Atago Jizō 愛宕地蔵, which charged at their enemies, putting them to flight."

Nakamiya-jinja Shrine was built by the lord of Kinugasa Castle, and it used to stand on Nokubo area which was between Mt. Takao and Senko-ji temple, so it was called 'Naka no Miya' (Naka means between in Japanese). Later, it was crashed because of the landslide and it lost a large land. The temporary shrine was built on the small land which was left from the landslide, but it was renewed in 1888, and a torii (gateway to a Shinto shrine) was added in 1928. It is told that the deity of the shrine is Izanami-no-Mikoto, and from ancient times, it was called Atago Gongen. Originally, Wake no Kiyomaro transferred the divided deity from Kyoto. In Kyoto, Goo-jinja Shrine enshrined Kiyomaro and there was a tradition that Ujiko worshiped Goo-jinja Shrine, received the charm, and brought it back to Nakamiya-jinja Shrine.

The philosopher Hayashi Razan lists the greatest of these daitengu as Sōjōbō of Kurama, Tarōbō of Atago, and Jirōbō of Hira. The demons of Kurama and Atago are among the most famous tengu.

== See also ==
- Atago Shrine (Kyoto)
- Atago Shrine (Tokyo)
- Gongen
- Honji suijaku
- Shinbutsu shūgō
