= Kūya =

Japanese Buddhist monk (903–972)

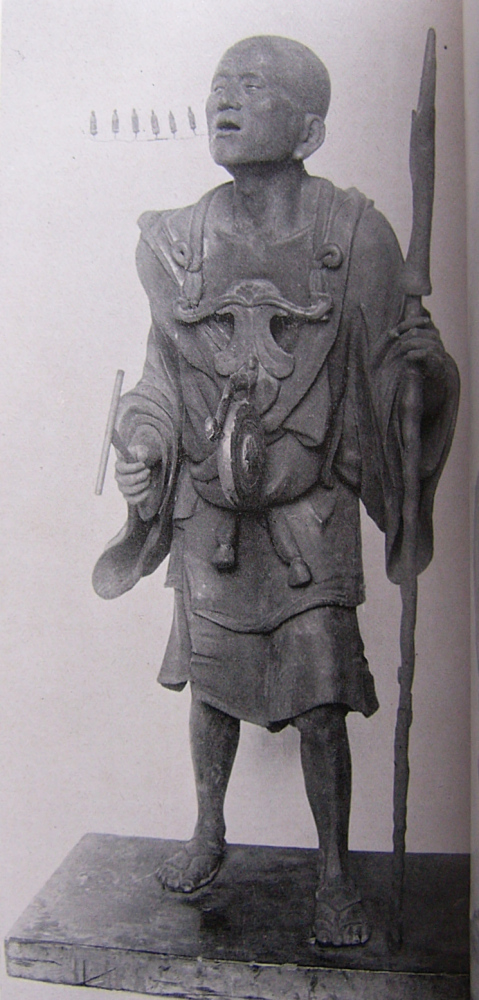
Statue of Kūya by Kōshō, son of Unkei, at Rokuharamitsu-ji (六波羅蜜寺), Kyoto, dating to the first decade of the thirteenth century and an Important Cultural Property. The six Chinese characters of the nembutsu, 南無阿弥陀仏 (na-mu-a-mi-da-butsu), are represented by six small figures of Amida streaming from Kūya's mouth. He walks as if on a pilgrimage, holding a staff topped with an antler and striking a gong. Similar statues, all of the Kamakura period and Important Cultural Properties, may be found at Tsukinowa-dera (月輪寺) in Kyoto, Jōdo-ji (浄土寺) in Ehime Prefecture and Shōgon-ji (荘厳寺) in Shiga Prefecture. There are a number of related images of Zendō (Shan-tao), with holes in the mouth thought to be for attaching now lost figures.

Kūya (空也; Japanese pronunciation: [kɯː.ja], 903-972) was an itinerant Japanese Buddhist monk, or hijiri (聖), later ordained in the Tendai Buddhist sect, who was an early proselytizer of the practice of the nembutsu amongst the populace. Kūya's efforts helped promote the Pure Land teaching of Buddhism to the capital at a time when the movement was first gaining traction in Japan. For his efforts, Kūya earned the name ichi hijiri (holy man of the marketplace) and Amida hijiri. Kūya was known for taking images with him on his travels and added musical rhythm and dance to his prayers, known as odori nembutsu. Like Gyōki, he is said to have performed works for the public benefit such as building roads and bridges, digging wells, and burying abandoned corpses.

== Biographies ==
Biographies of Kūya were written by his friends and followers Jakushin and Minamoto-no-Tamenori, and Number 18 of the Ryōjin Hishō derives from 'Kūya's Praise'. The late tenth-century collection of biographies of those who had attained rebirth in the Pure Land, the Nihon ōjō gokuraki ki, attributes to Kūya the devotion of all Japan to the nembutsu. He is also known as founder of Rokuharamitsu-ji where he later died.

Details of Kūya's life are very scant prior to 938, but in the existing biographies it is said that Kūya, possibly of Imperial lineage, took tonsure at a temple in Owari Province in his youth and traveled to various holy sites and performing good works in the community. Later, Kūya traveled to Awa and Tosa provinces before undertaking austerities at a place called Yushima (湯島) before a statue of Kannon. After attaining a vision of Kannon, he traveled to other provinces and eventually came to the capital in 938. Due to an ongoing revolt at the time, people from the provinces were displaced and came to the capital. Kūya was said to beg for food and then distribute that food to refugees and others who were suffering. Additionally, Kūya constructed Buddhist stupa and hanging scrolls depicting Kannon and Amitābha Buddha. Since his early years traveling the provinces, Kūya employed the nembutsu as a means of magically delivering the dead to the Pure Land, in contrast to the practice at the time where the dead were frequently left to decompose where they were left.

Kūya was fully ordained as a monk in 948 in the Tendai Buddhist sect at Enryakuji temple on Mount Hiei, and continued promoting the practice of the nembutsu while engaging in other activities. In 963, Kūya staged a grand ceremony to commemorate the completion of a copy, begun in 950 and relying on community donations, of the Mahaprajnaparamita Sutra composed in gold ink. Research suggests this sutra project was intended to relieve epidemics and pacify the spirits of the dead. The biographies continue describing further miracles performed by Kūya until his death in 972.

== Beliefs ==
Details of Kūya's religious beliefs are not explicitly explained in the biographies, but it is inferred from his actions that Kūya viewed the nembutsu as a form of thaumaturgy or miracle-working, as well as a form of salvation more common in later Pure Land teachings. Stories of hijiri itinerant monks (cf. Gyōki) were common in the early Heian period, and Kūya is counted among them, but differs somewhat in his employment of the nembutsu as opposed to more widespread esoteric practices. Further, Kūya was not exclusively devoted to Amitābha Buddha, but venerated other Buddhist deities, particularly Kannon Bodhisattva.

=== Bowl-beating ===
Kūya's followers commemorated his death for 48 nights from 13 November onwards, by bowl-beating (hachi-tataki) in and around Kyoto.

The haiku poets were very struck by this practice, making 'cold prayers' (kan-nembutsu) a set topic, and giving rise to Basho's famous tribute: "Dried salted salmon, / Kūya's emaciation also, / During the coldest season".

== See also ==
- Pure Land Buddhism
- Jōdo shū
- Jōdo Shinshū
- Nembutsu
- Kanjin
