= Atago Shrine (Kyoto) =

Shinto shrine in Kyoto, Japan

Atago Jinja 愛宕神社
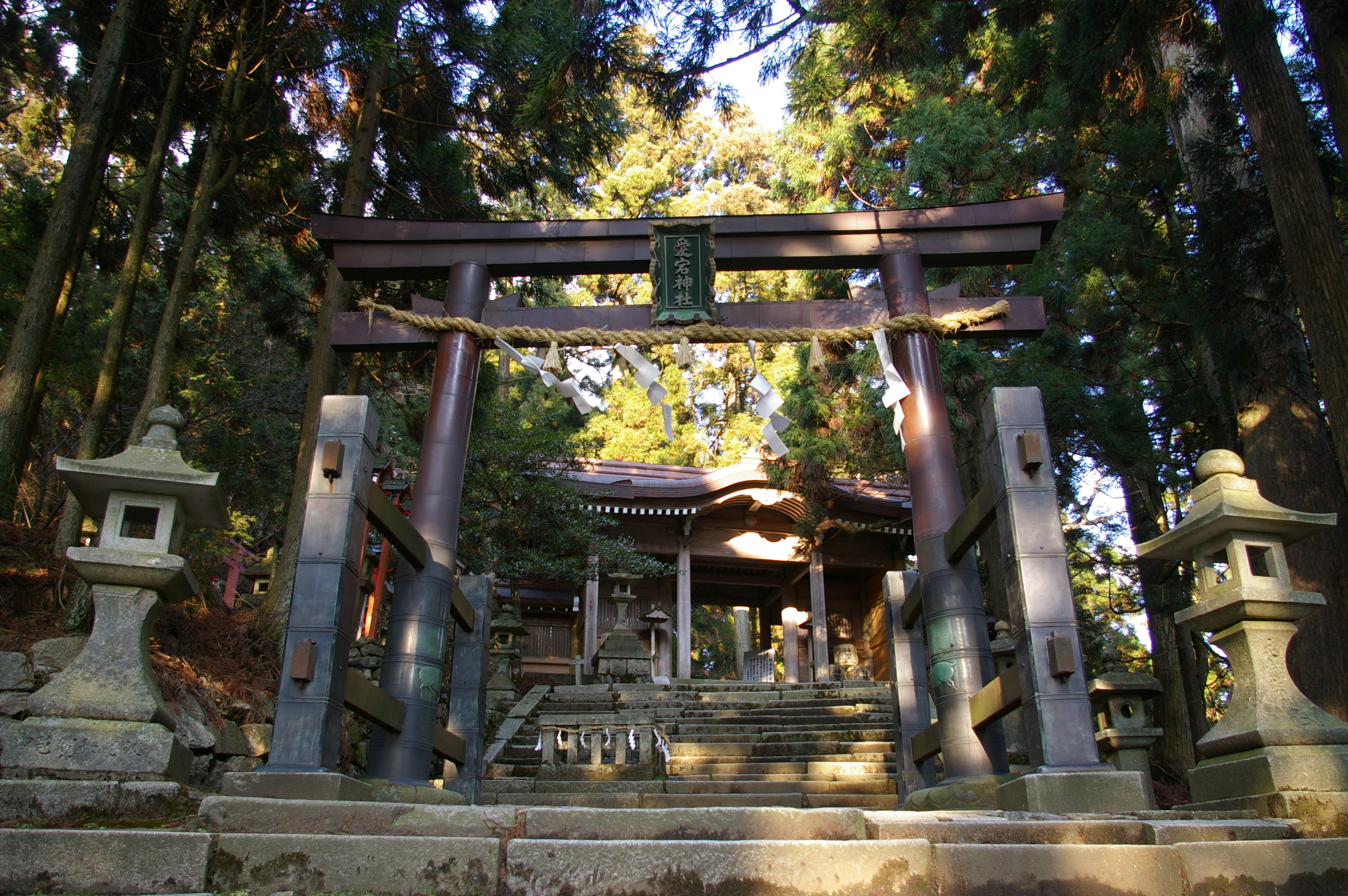
- Torii leading to Atago Jinja in Kyoto

- Location within Japan

Religion
- Affiliation: Shinto
- Deity: Atago Gongen
- Festival: Sen-nichi Tsuyasai (July 31)
- Type: Atago shrine

Location
- Location: Atago-chō, Ukyo-ku, Kyoto
- Coordinates: 35°3′36″N 135°38′4″E

Architecture
- Founder: En no Ozunu, Taichō
- Established: 701 - 704

Website
- atagojinjya.jp

Atago Shrine (愛宕神社, Atago-jinja) is a Shinto shrine on Mount Atago, the northwest of Kyoto, Japan. Enshrined is Atago Gongen who protects Kyoto from fire. Shugendō practices and a place for worship are known from the eighth century. The late-Kamakura period Honden has been designated an Important Cultural Property. (Actually, the late-Kamakura period Honden is located at another Atago-jinja in Kameoka, to the northwest of Kyoto : 35°2′28″N 135°35′13″E) Atago Jinja is the head of nine hundred Atago shrines throughout Japan.

== Deities ==
=== Main hall ===
- Izanami no Mikoto
- Haniyasuhime no Mikoto
- Amenokumahito no Mikoto
- Wakumusubi no Kami
- Toyoukebime no Mikoto

=== Wakamiya ===
- Ikazuchi no Kami
- Kagutsuchi no Mikoto
- Hamushi no Kami

=== Okumiya ===
- Ōkuninushi

== See also ==
- Atago Jinja (Tokyo)
- Shinbutsu shūgō
- Honji suijaku
- Tsukinowa-dera
