= Atago, Tokyo =

District in Tokyo, Japan

Coordinates: 35.6648°N 139.7484°E

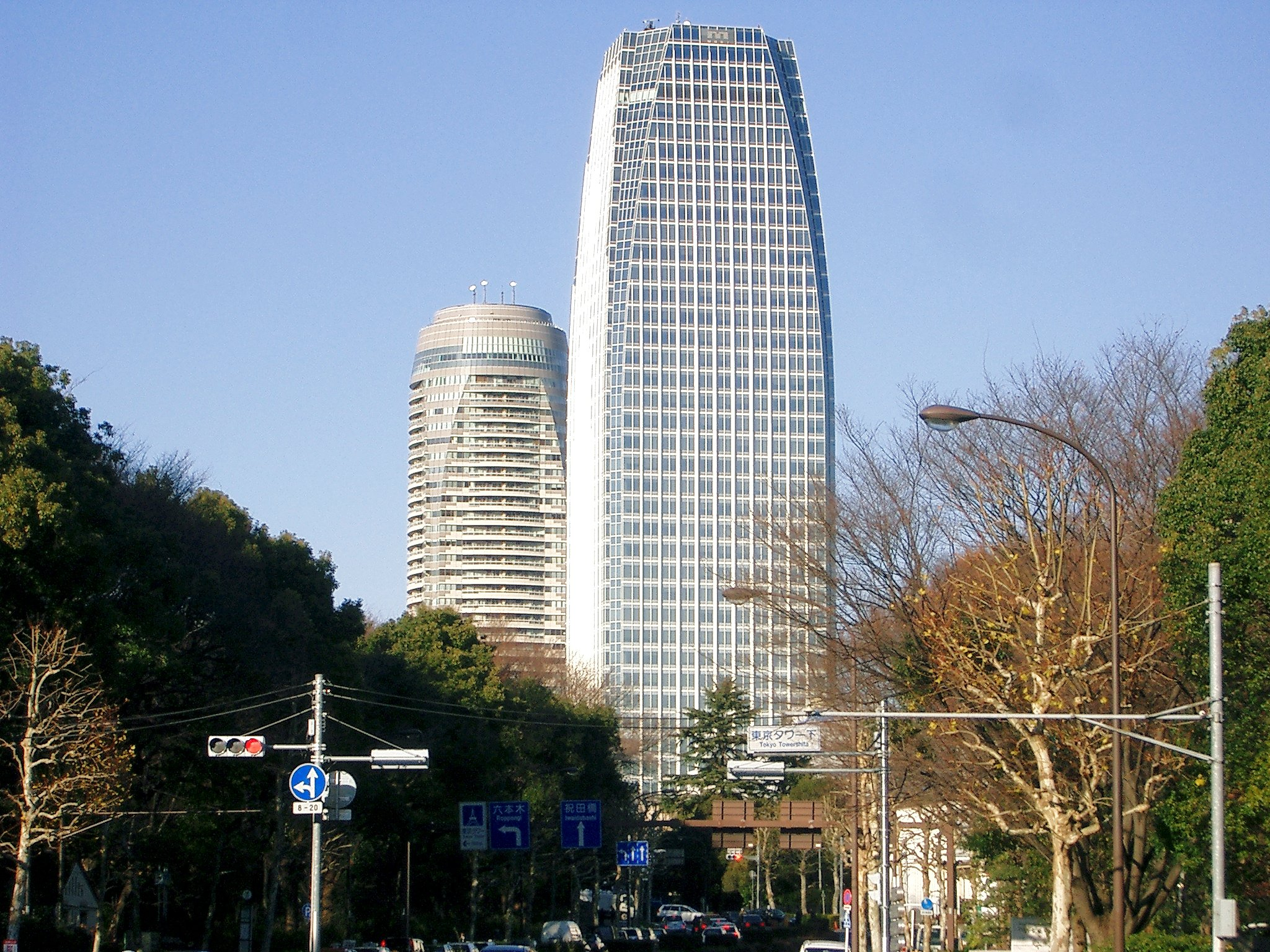
Atago Green Hills

Atago (愛宕) is a district of Minato, Tokyo, Japan. It consists of 1-chōme and 2-chōme. As of April 1, 2025, it has a total population of 1,090.

== Geography ==
Mount Atago (愛宕山, Atago-yama) occupies most of the district. The lower zone located between Mt. Atago and Tokyo Metropolitan Route 301, also known as Atago Shita Dōri Avenue (愛宕下通り, Atago Shita Dōri), was a dense residential neighborhood but recently underwent urban renewal. It is now known as a home to Atago Green Hills, an urban complex constructed by building tycoon Minoru Mori.

=== Mount Atago ===
Located in the Atago district, Mount Atago is the highest natural mountain in the 23 special wards of Tokyo, with an elevation of 25.7 m. The Atago Shrine (愛宕神社, Atago Jinja) is housed on the mountain. The first radio station in Japan, the Tokyo Broadcasting Station (now NHK AM), began broadcasting from Mount Atago in 1925, and its former site is now home to the NHK Museum of Broadcasting.

== Education ==
Minato City Board of Education operates public elementary and junior high schools.

Atago 1-2-chōme are zoned to Onarimon Elementary School (御成門小学校) and Onarimon Junior High School (御成門中学校).

Atago is home to Kanazawa Institute of Technology's Tokyo Toranomon Campus.
