= Atago-class destroyer =

Guided-missile destroyer class in the Japanese Maritime Self-Defense Forces

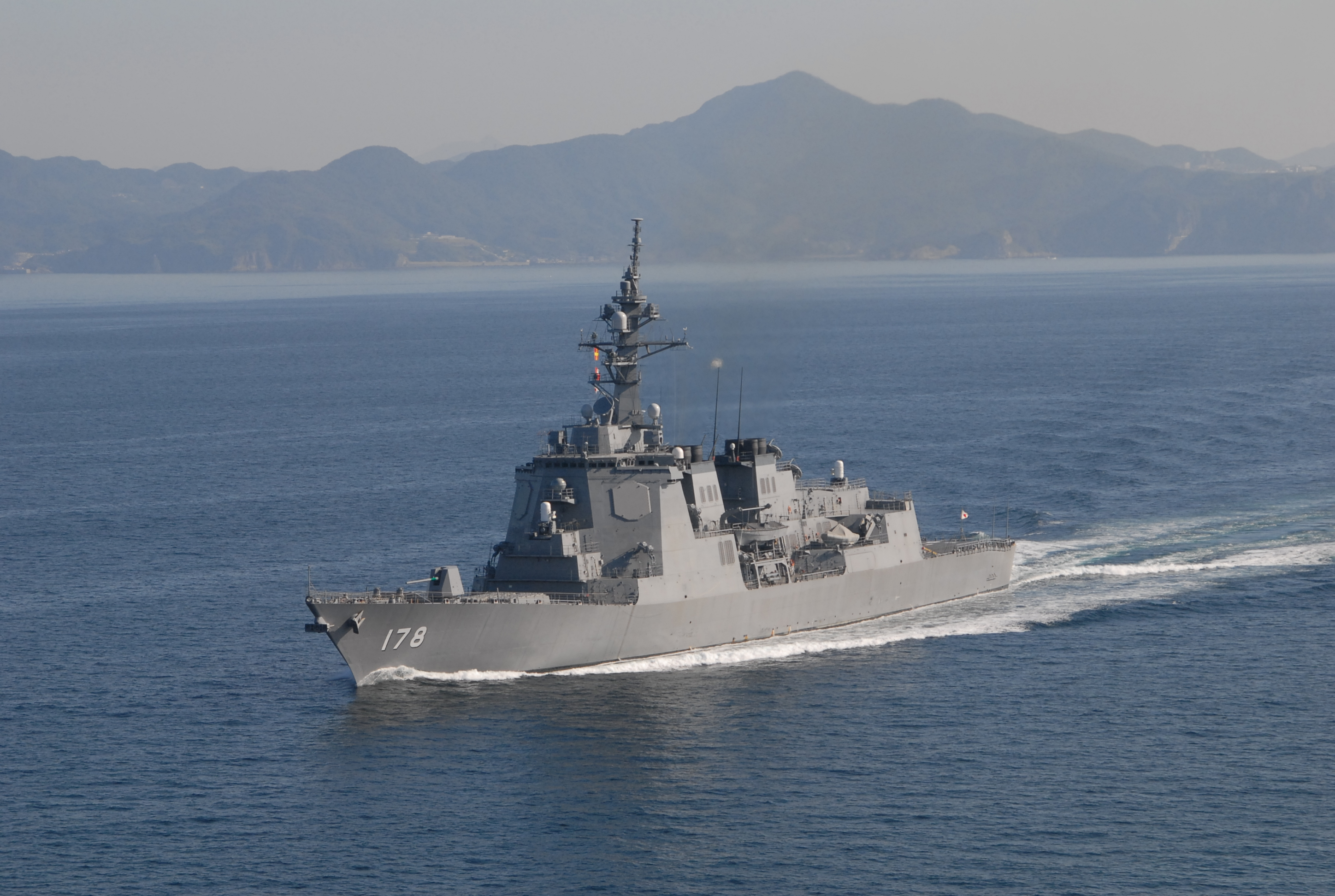
- JS Ashigara

Class overview
- Name: Atago class
- Builders: Mitsubishi Heavy Industries
- Operators: Japan Maritime Self-Defense Force
- Preceded by: Kongō class
- Succeeded by: Maya class
- Cost: ¥140 billion; $1.48 billion (constant 2009 USD)
- Built: 2004–2008
- In commission: 2007–
- Completed: 2
- Active: 2

General characteristics
- Type: Large guided-missile destroyer
- Displacement: 7,700 tons standard; 10,000 tons full load
- Length: 165.0 m (541 ft 4 in)
- Beam: 21.0 m (68 ft 11 in)
- Draft: 6.1 m (20 ft 0 in)
- Propulsion: 4 IHI/GE LM2500-30 gas turbines; Two shafts 5-bladed CP props; 100,000 shp (75,000 kW)
- Speed: 30 knots (56 km/h)
- Boats & landing craft carried: 2 × 11-meter work boats; 1 × Rigid hull inflatable boat
- Complement: 300
- Sensors & processing systems: AN/SPY-1D(V) multi-function radar; OPS-28E surface search radar (later replaced by SPQ-9B); 3 × AN/SPG-62 illuminators; AN/SQQ-89 with SQS-53C and OQR-2 (later replaced by SQR-20); Mk. 46 Optronic director
- Electronic warfare & decoys: NOLQ-2B intercept and jammer; 4 × Mk. 36 SRBOC Chaff and Decoy Launching System
- Armament: 1 × 5-inch (127 mm)/62 Mk 45 Mod 4 gun; 8 × Type 90 (SSM-1B) anti-ship missile in quad canisters; 2 × 20 mm Phalanx CIWS; 2 × HOS-302 triple torpedo tubes: Mark 46 torpedo; Type 73 torpedoes; 96-cell Mk 41 Vertical Launching System: SM-2MR surface-to-air missiles; SM-3 anti-ballistic missiles; VL-ASROC anti-submarine missiles; RIM-162 surface-to-air missiles
- Aircraft carried: 1 × SH-60K helicopter
- Aviation facilities: Flight deck and enclosed hangar for one helicopter

The Atago class of large guided-missile destroyers (あたご型護衛艦, Atago-gata Goeikan) in the Japan Maritime Self-Defense Force is a modified version of the Kongō class equipped with the Aegis Combat System.

== Background ==
The Maritime Self-Defense Force (MSDF) began construction of the Aegis-equipped Kongō class in FY1988 as the core ship for air defense of its fleet. With the commission of the Kongo class, each of the four escort flotillas (護衛隊群, Goei-tai-gun) had one Tartar-equipped destroyer and one Aegis-equipped destroyer.

In the 2000s, the steam-powered Tachikaze-class destroyers were nearing the end of their life, and their Tartar Weapon Systems were becoming obsolete. As their replacements, two Aegis-equipped destroyers, Atago class, were built in the FY2002 and 2003 budget.

== Design ==
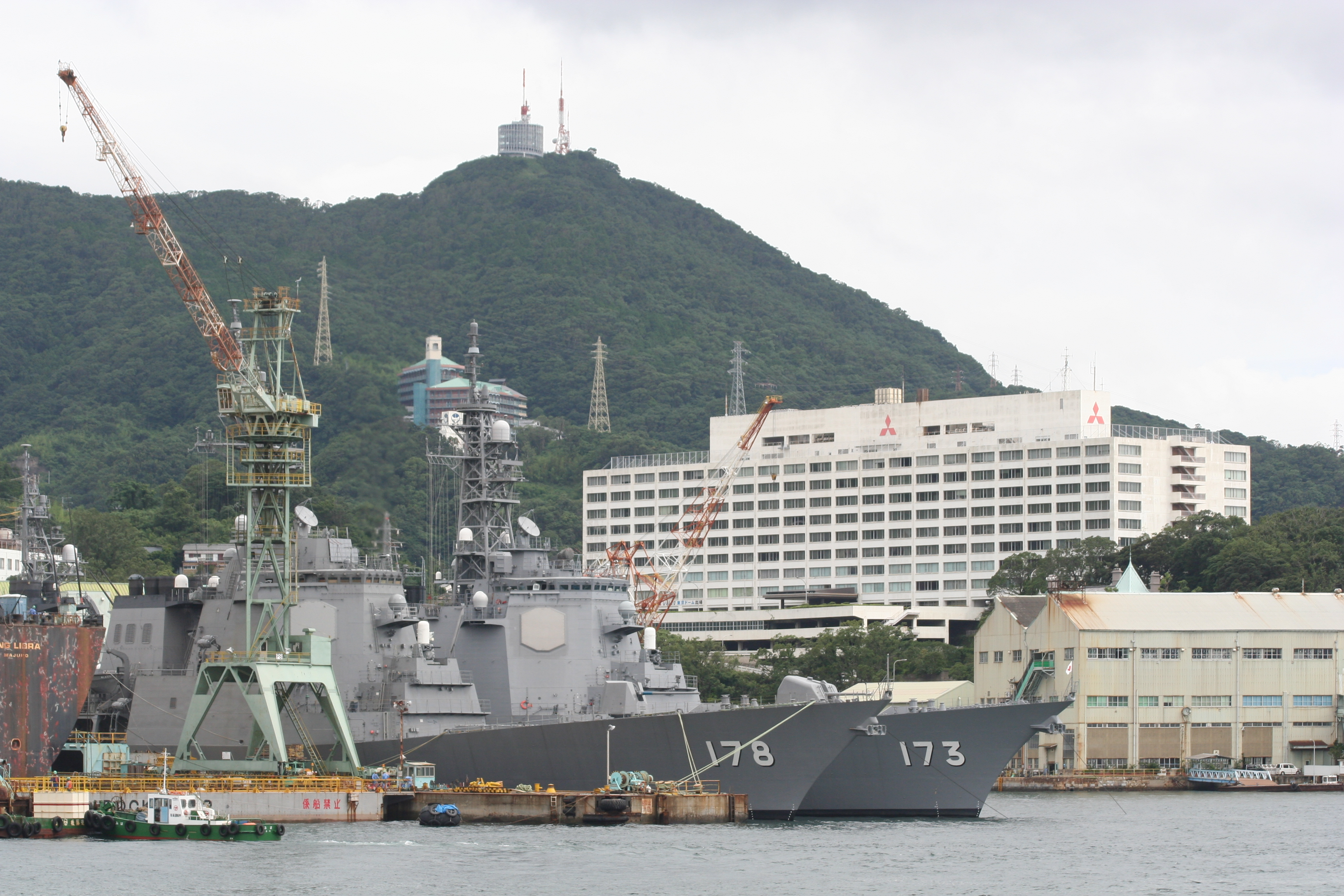
JS Kongō with JS Ashigara under construction at Mitsubishi in Nagasaki.

The design is fundamentally an improved and scaled-up version of the Kongō-class destroyers with a 4-meter extension of the hull. Just as the Kongō class, the superstructure is larger than aboard the American counterparts, Arleigh Burke-class Flight IIA.

One of the most obvious changes is an additional hangar to carry one SH-60K helicopter. In comparison to the Kongō class which only had a helicopter deck, these ships have better helicopter handling facilities.

Another external feature is the reduction of the radar cross-sectional area. For example, the Atago class use a new stealthier plain-structure mast, which was originally designed in Japan, rather than familiar sturdy truss mast. A new modified smokestack and other improvements were also introduced to make the Atagos stealthier.

The propulsion systems are almost the same as those of the Kongō class and Arleigh Burke class, powered by four Ishikawajima-Harima LM2500 gas turbines giving them a top speed of 30 knots (56 km/h; 35 mph). The installation of three generators is also retained, but the output per unit is increased to 2,800 kilowatts.

== Equipment ==
The class is equipped with the Aegis Weapon System (AWS). The system version was Baseline 7.1 immediately after they were put into service; then both ships have been updated to Baseline 9C with modernization.

As surface-to-air missiles, The SM-2MR Block IIIA/B has been used. Since FY 2016, they have also been equipped with a missile defense capability with an Aegis BMD 5.0CU system to launch SM-3 Block IA and IB anti-ballistic missiles.

The missile launcher is the same Mark 41 Vertical Launching System as the Kongo class, but the missile reloading crane has been omitted, so the number of missile cells is increased by 3 cells each on the bow and stern sides. The Kongo class had 29 cells on the foredeck and 61 cells on the afterdeck, but the Atago class has a hangar, so 64 cells are placed on the foredeck and 32 cells on the afterdeck.

These cells contain not only RIM-162, SM-2, and SM-3, but also VL-ASROCs. Additionally, they are equipped with HOS-302, one of the Japanese variant of the Mark 32 Surface Vessel Torpedo Tubes, as anti-submarine weapons. While the Kongō class is equipped with domestic sonar and ASW combat system, the Atago class is equipped with American-made AN/SQQ-89(V)15 with AN/SQS-53C sonar. Only the towing sonar was a domestic OQR-2D-1, which was later replaced with an American-made SQR-20 Multi-Function Towed Array (MFTA).

The 127mm bore gun's barrel has been extended from the 54 caliber of the Kongō class to the 62 caliber with strengthened powder charge enabling a 38 km (24 mi) firing range. As with other Japanese ships being refit, the American-made Harpoon missiles (such as in the initial configuration of the Kongō class) can be replaced with the Japanese-made Type 90 (SSM-1B) surface-to-surface missiles; those interfaces are compatible.

== Ships in the class ==
Building No.	Pennant No.	Name	Laid down	Launched	Commissioned	Home port
2317	DDG-177	Atago	5 April 2004	24 August 2005	15 March 2007	Maizuru
2318	DDG-178	Ashigara	6 April 2005	30 August 2006	13 March 2008	Sasebo

== See also ==
- List of destroyer classes in service

Equivalent destroyers of the same era

- Sejong the Great class (Batch I)
- Type 45
- Kolkata class
- Type 052C
