= Atago Shrine (Tokyo) =

Shinto shrine in Tokyo, Japan

Atago Shrine (愛宕神社, Atago Jinja)
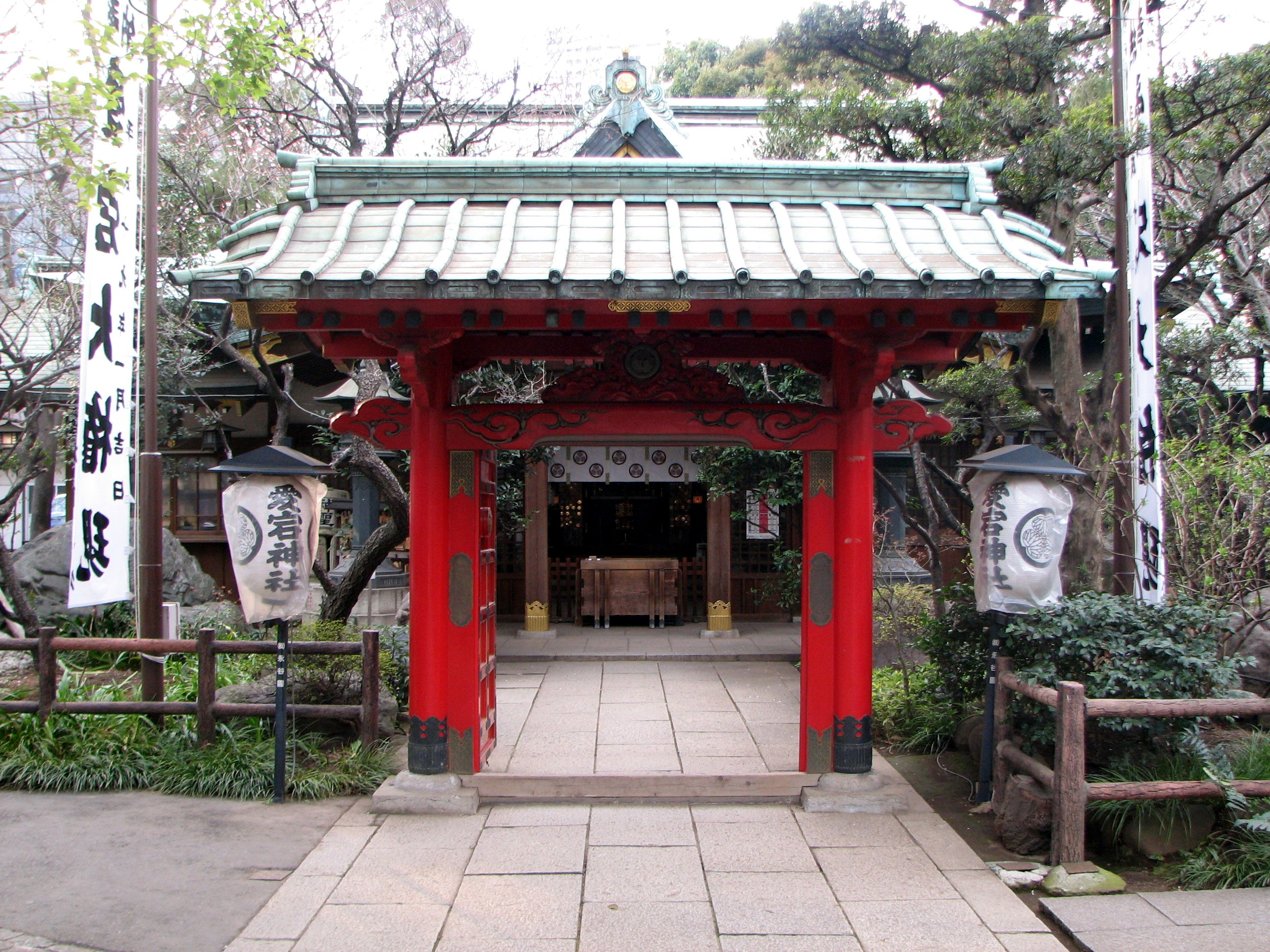
- Main building of the Atago shrine in Tokyo

- Location within Japan

Religion
- Affiliation: Shinto

Location
- Interactive map of Atago Shrine (愛宕神社, Atago Jinja)
- Coordinates: 35°39′53″N 139°44′54″E

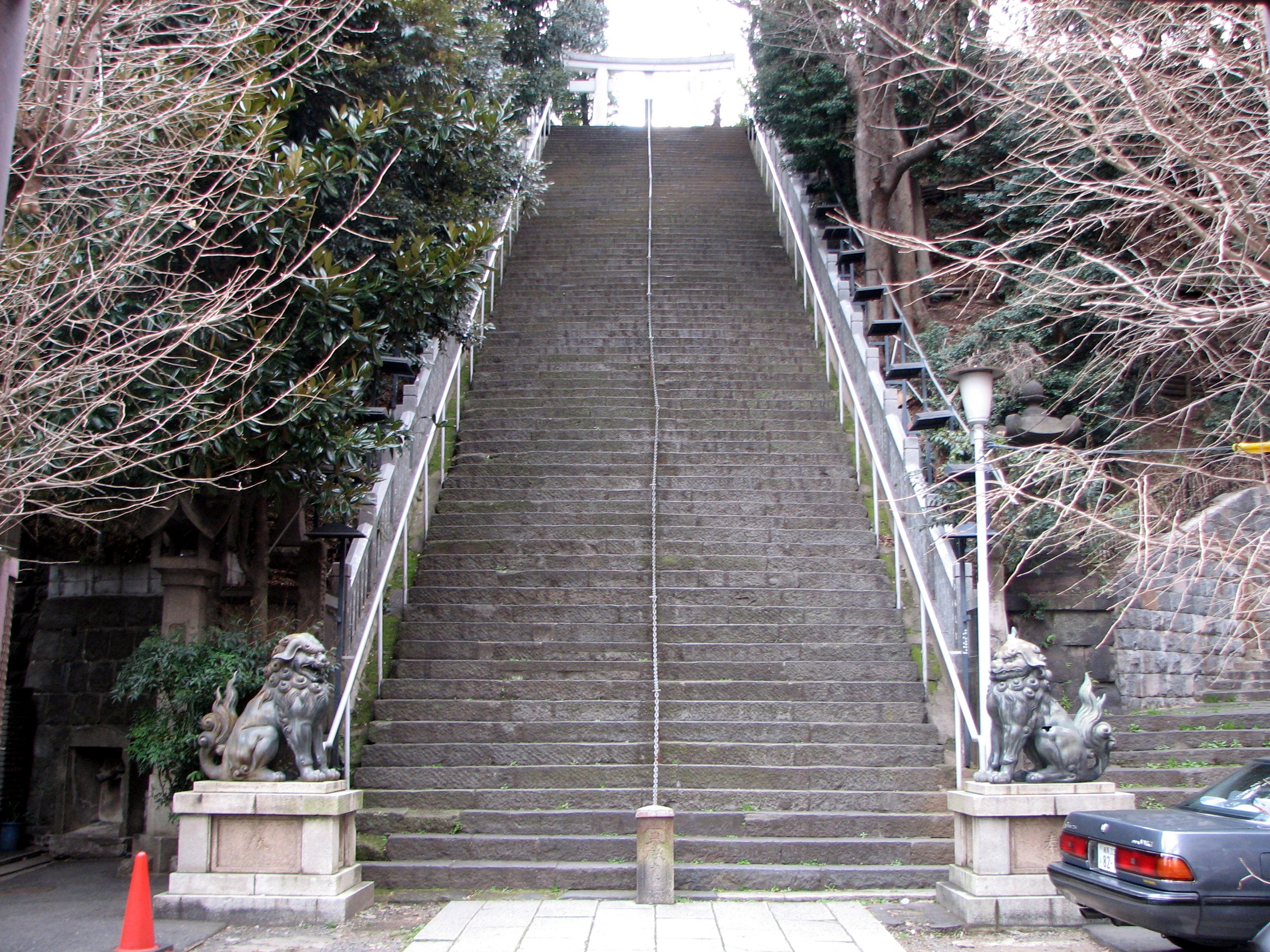
Stairs to the Atago shrine in Tokyo

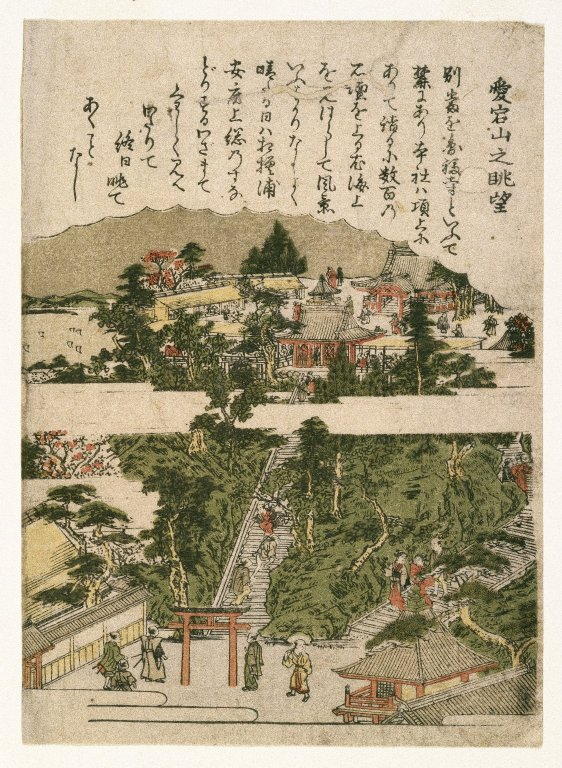
Panoramic view of Atagoyama circa 1770, by Kitao Shigemasa

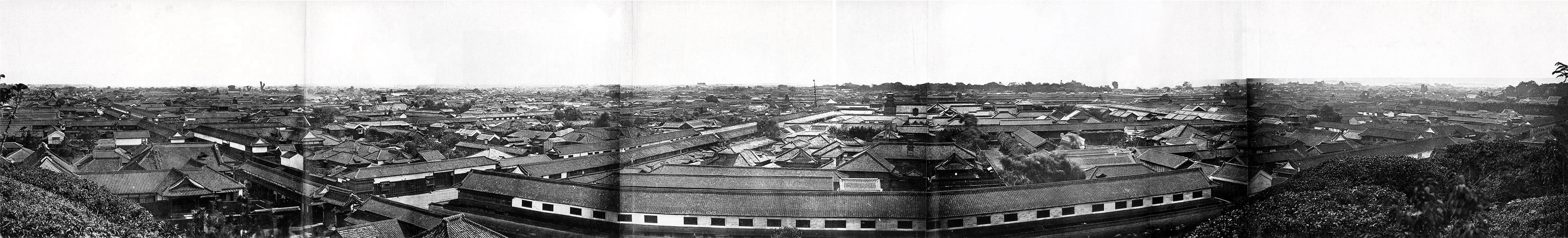
Panorama of Yedo (Tokyo) from Atagoyama, Felice Beato 1865

The Atago Shrine (愛宕神社, Atago Jinja) in Minato, Tokyo, Japan is a Shinto shrine established in 1603 (the eighth year of the Keichō era) on the order of shōgun Tokugawa Ieyasu. The current shrine buildings on the site date from 1958.

The shrine is located on Atagoyama, a hill rising 26 meters above sea level. In old times, the shrine had a splendid view of Tokyo, now obscured by high rises. The very steep stairs leading to the shrine are also famous, as they represent success in life.

According to legend, a young samurai dared to ride his horse up the stairs to deliver plum blossoms to the shōgun. It took his horse only one minute to get up, but 45 minutes to get down, and the horse was utterly exhausted afterwards. This scene is depicted in a painting in the main shrine hall.

The shrine was erected to protect residents from fire, since its formerly excellent views were well suited to watch for fires, and therefore the main Shinto god worshipped in this shrine is the fire god Homusubi no Mikoto. Other gods worshipped are Mizuhanome no Mikoto (a god of water), Ōyamazumi no Mikoto (a god of mountains), and Yamato Takeru no Mikoto (a god of the military).

== See also ==
- Atago Gongen
- Atago Jinja (Kyoto)
