= Mount Atago =

Popular shrine atop Mount Atago in Japan

- 愛宕山
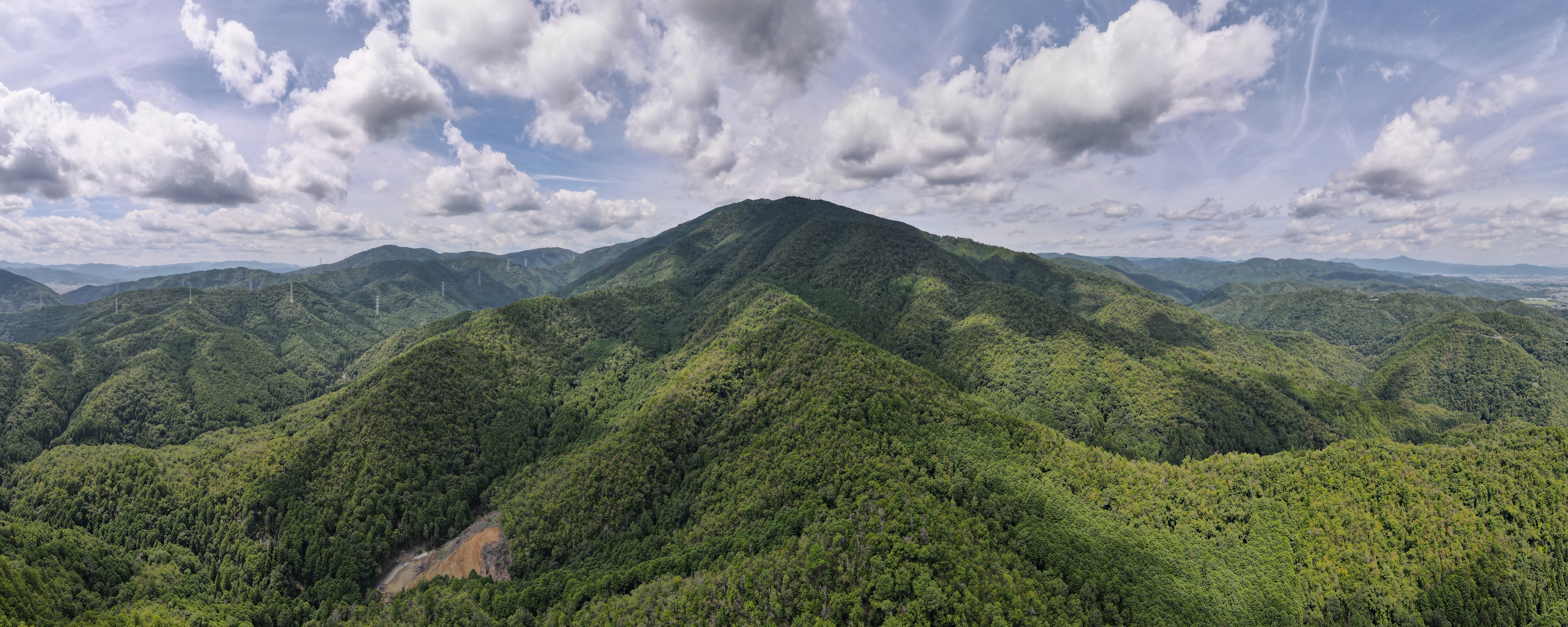
- Aerial drone panorama of Mount Atago, as taken from the south

Highest point
- Elevation: 924 m (3,031 ft)
- Listing: List of mountains and hills of Japan by height
- Coordinates: 35°3′36″N 135°38′3″E

Geography
- Location: Kyoto, Japan
- Topo map(s): Geographical Survey Institute 25000:1 京都西北部, 50000:1 京都及大阪

Mount Atago (愛宕山, Atago-yama/san) is a 924m mountain in the northwestern part of Ukyo-ku, in the city of Kyoto, Kyoto Prefecture, Japan. The Atago Shrine is located on the top of the mountain.

== Gallery ==
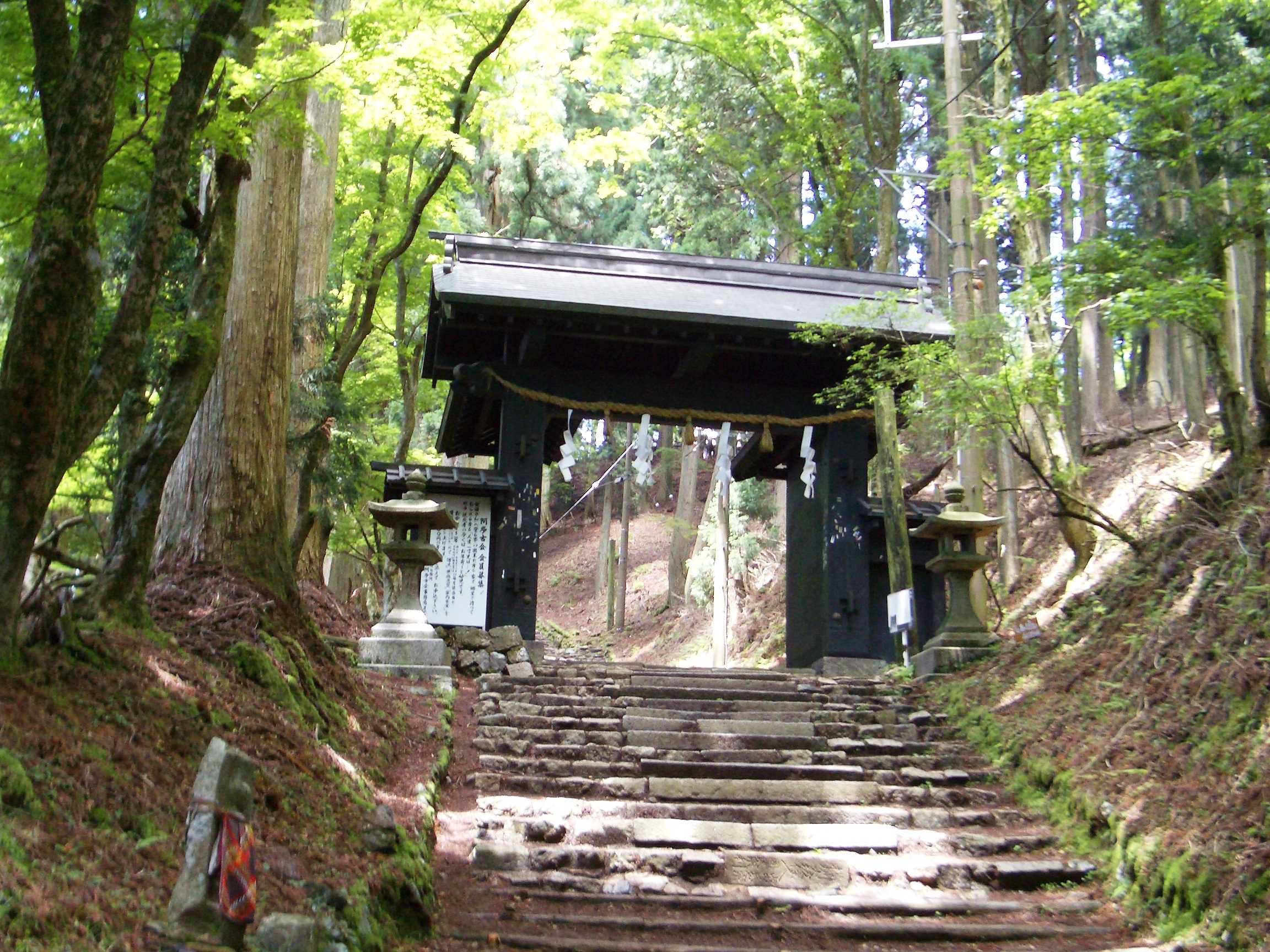
The Kuromon Gate of Mount Atago

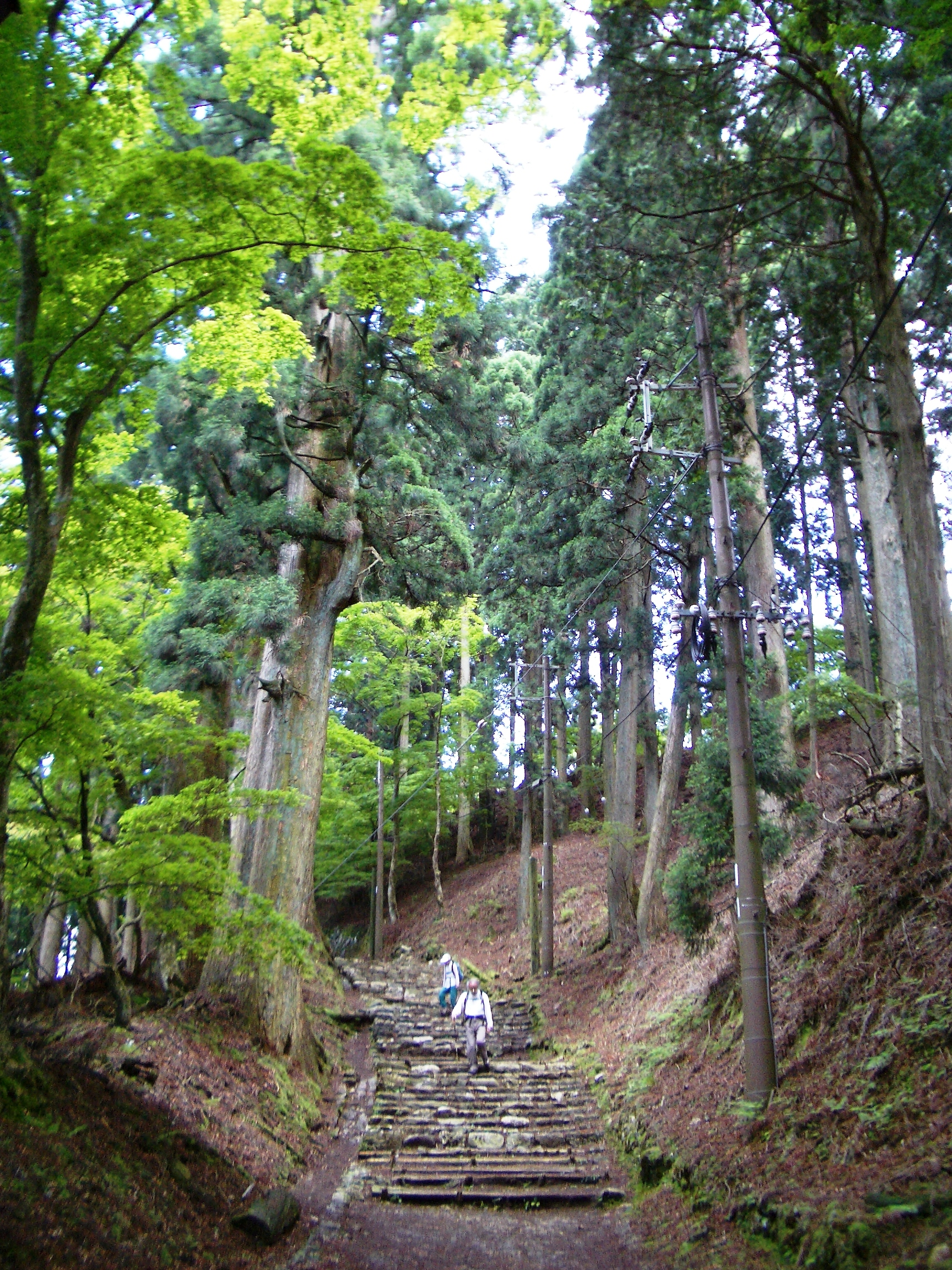
The way to the top of Mount Atago

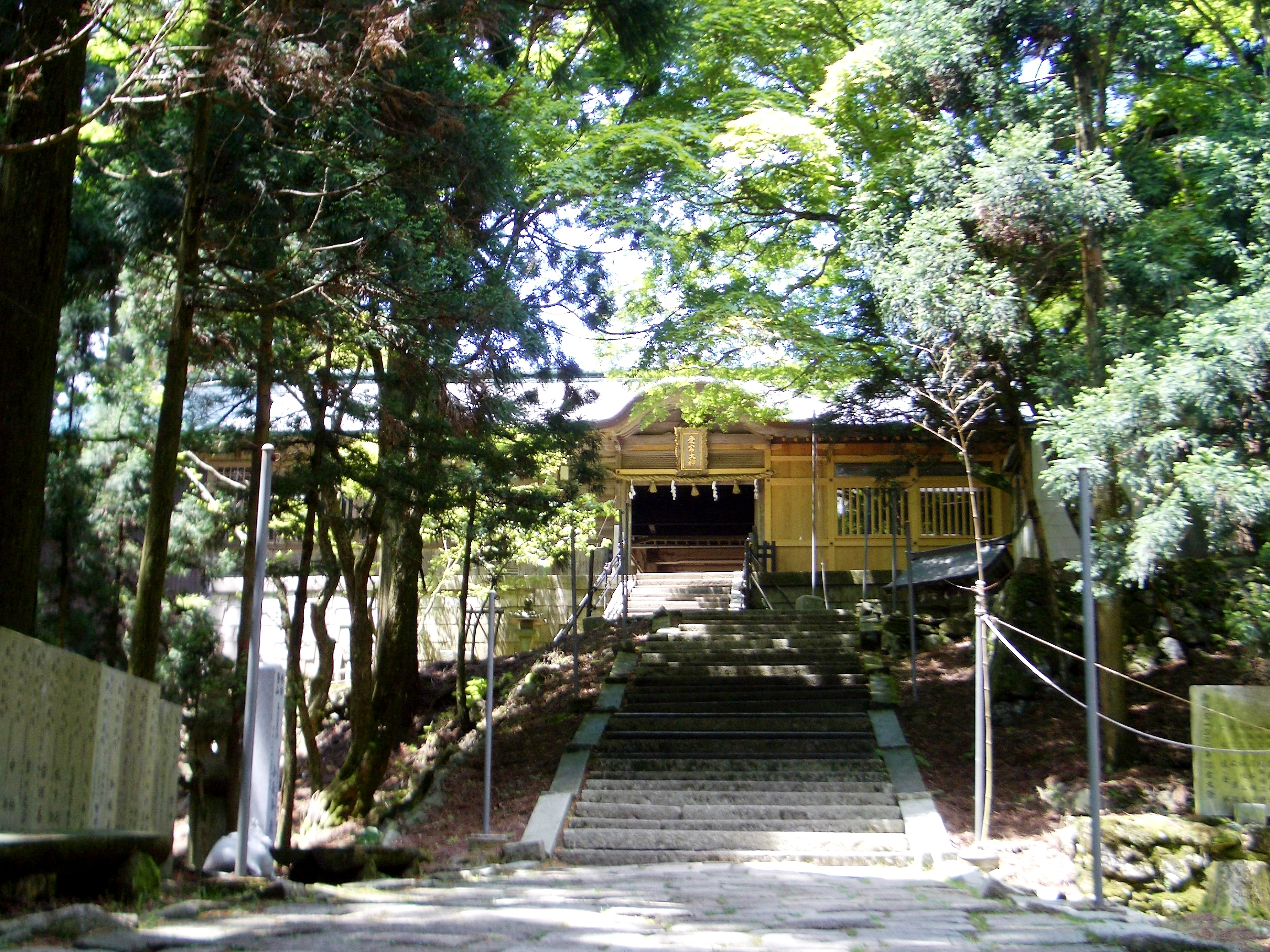
Atago Shrine on the top of Mount Atago

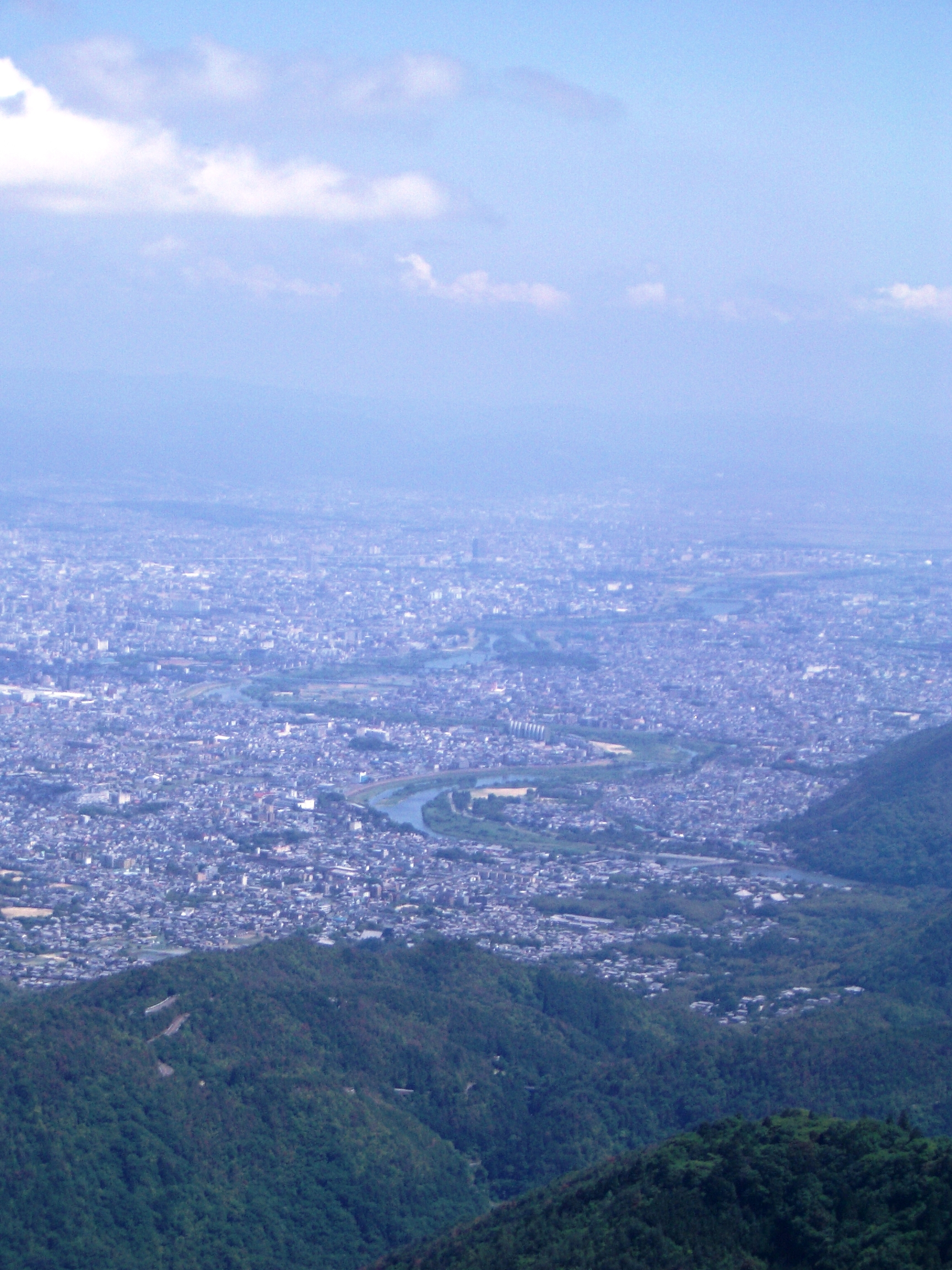
Katsura River from Mount Atago

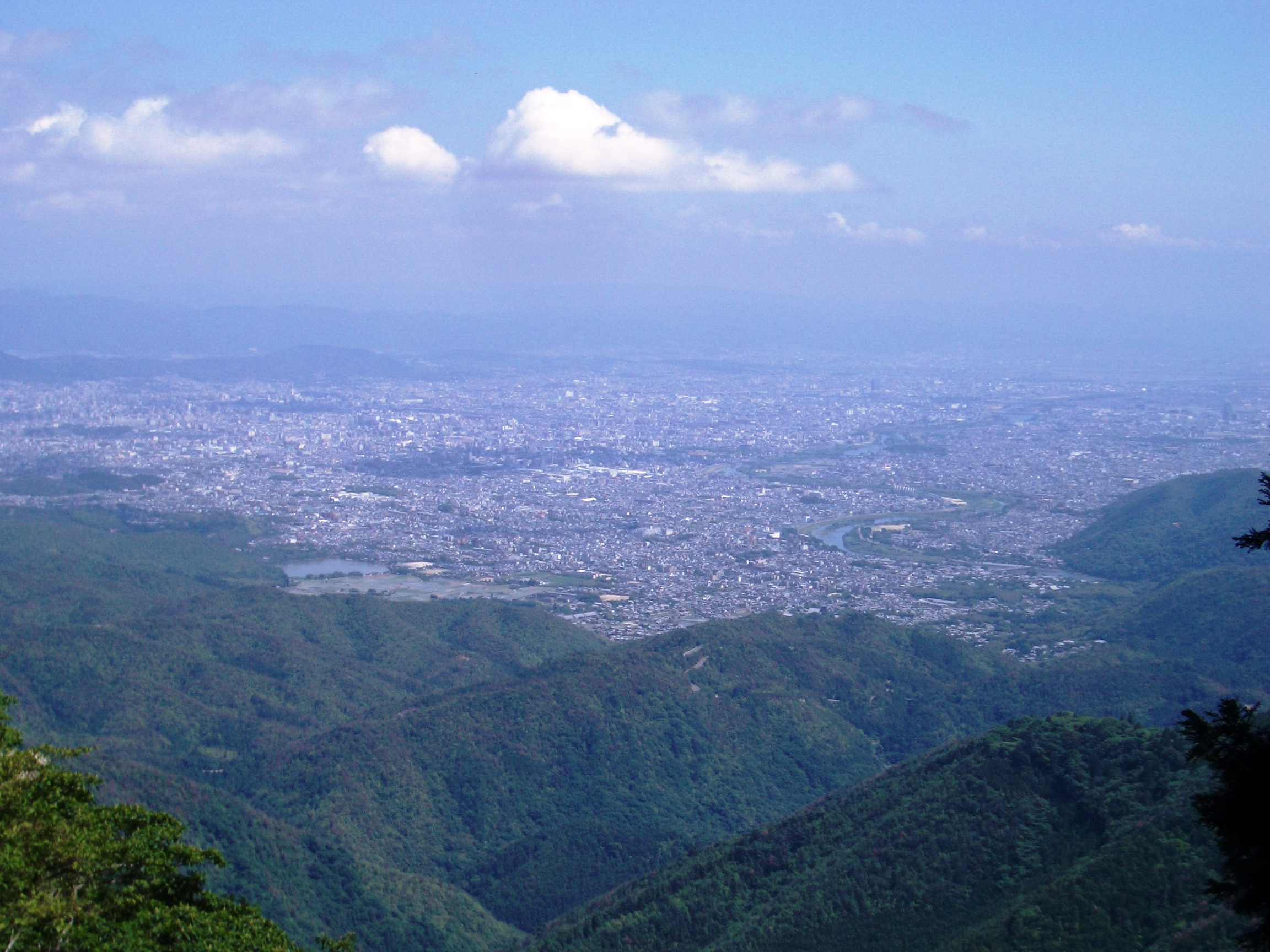
Kyoto City from Mount Atago

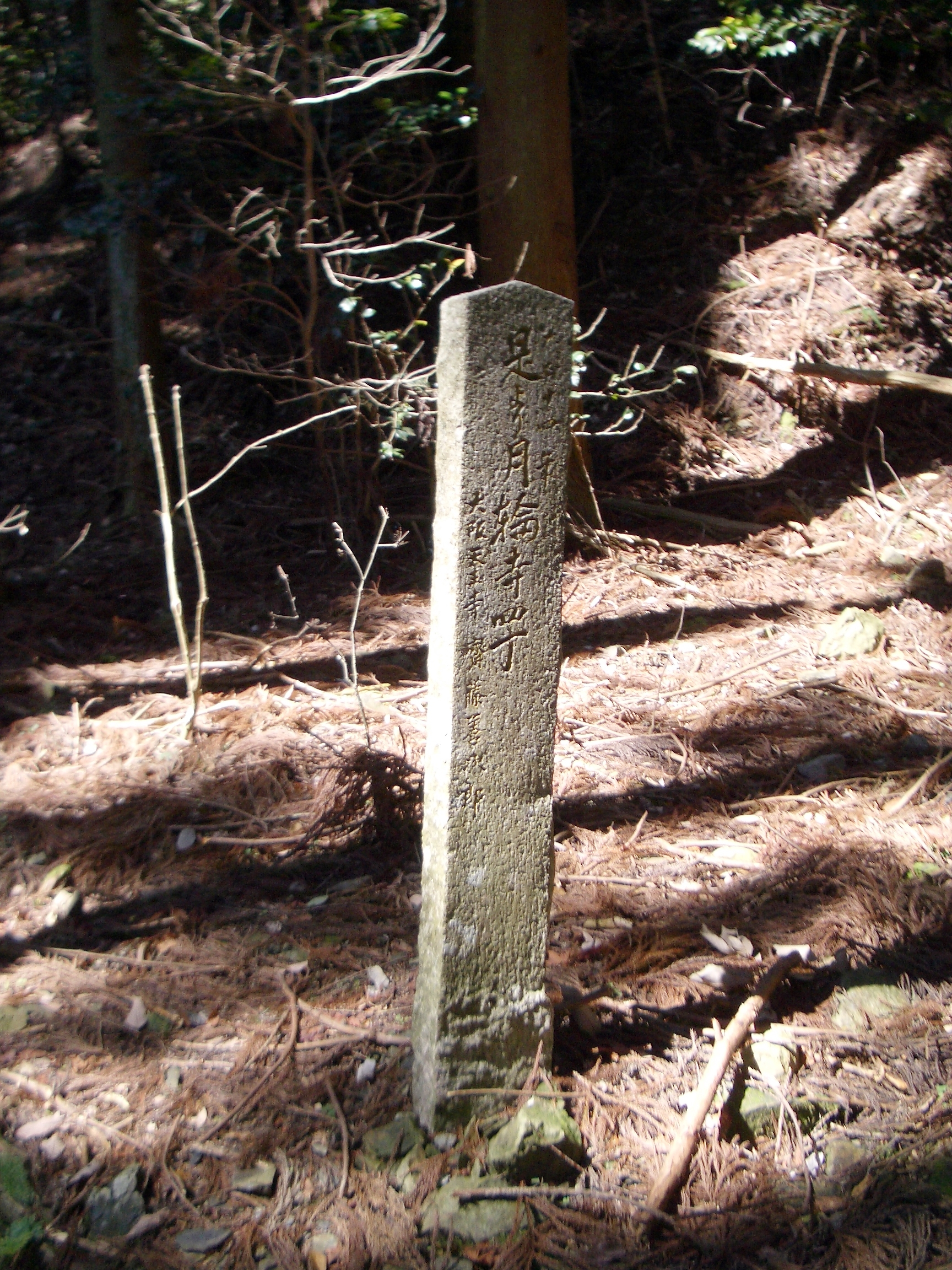
A guidepost in Mount Atago

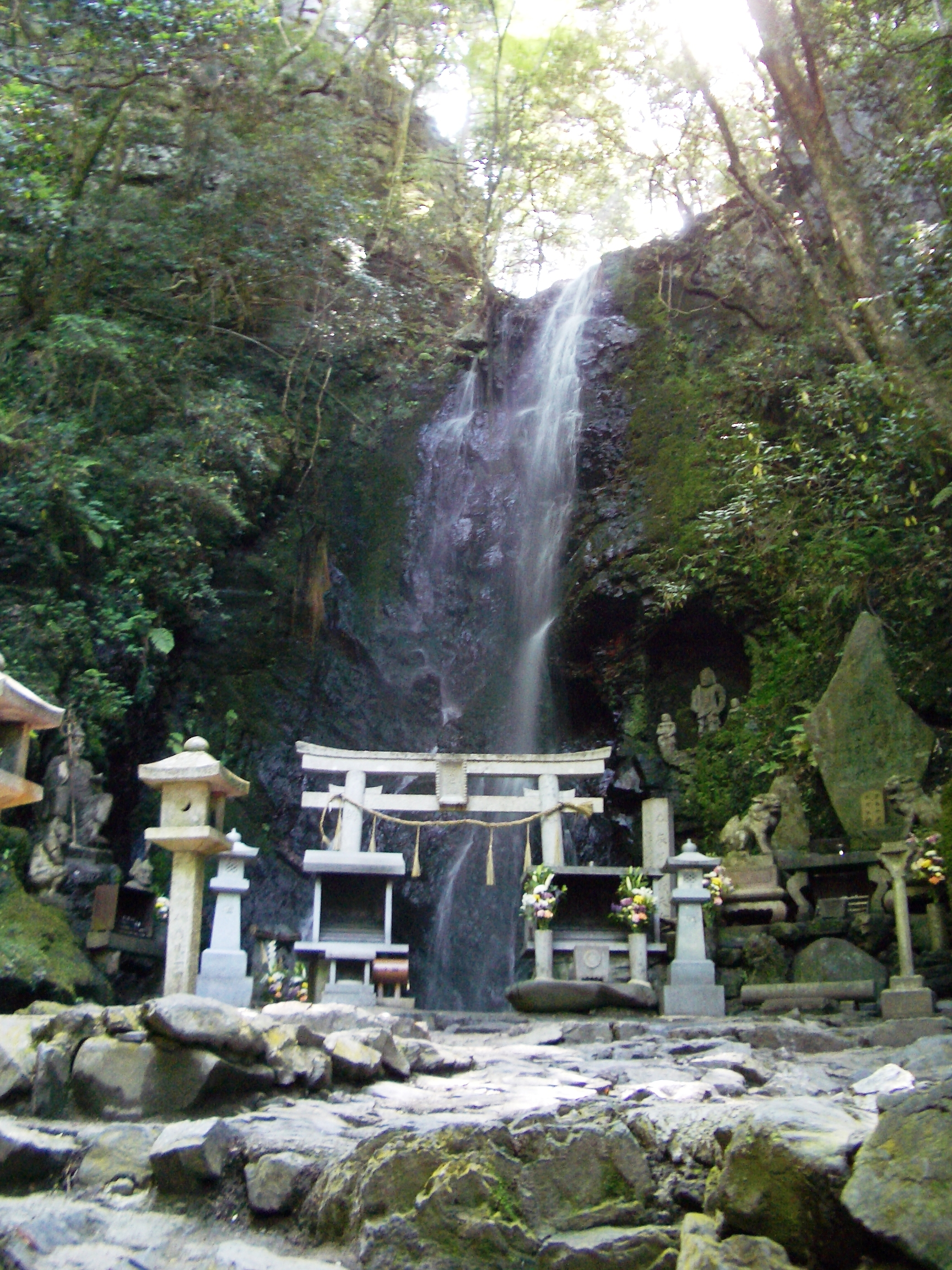
Fudo Waterfall in Mount Atago

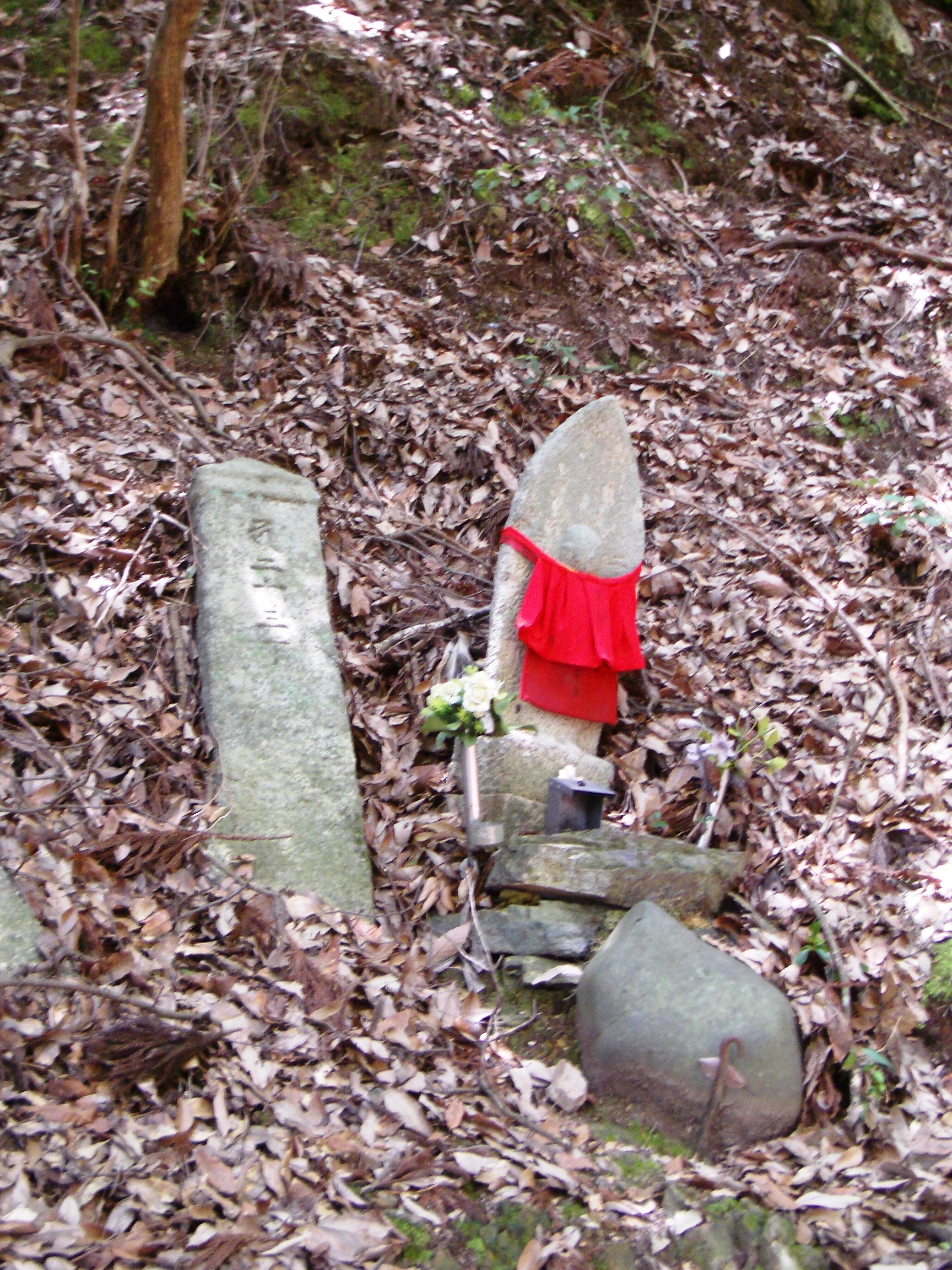
Religious objects in Mount Atago

== See also ==
- Atago class destroyer
- Japanese cruiser Atago
