= Mori Tower =

Mori Tower may refer to:

- Roppongi Hills Mori Tower, a 54-story skyscraper
- Atago Green Hills MORI Tower, a 42-story skyscraper
- Ark Hills Sengokuyama Mori Tower
- Toranomon Hills Mori Tower, a 52-story skyscraper
- Jakarta Mori Tower
