= Azabudai Hills =

Skyscraper complex in Tokyo, Japan

- 麻布台ヒルズ

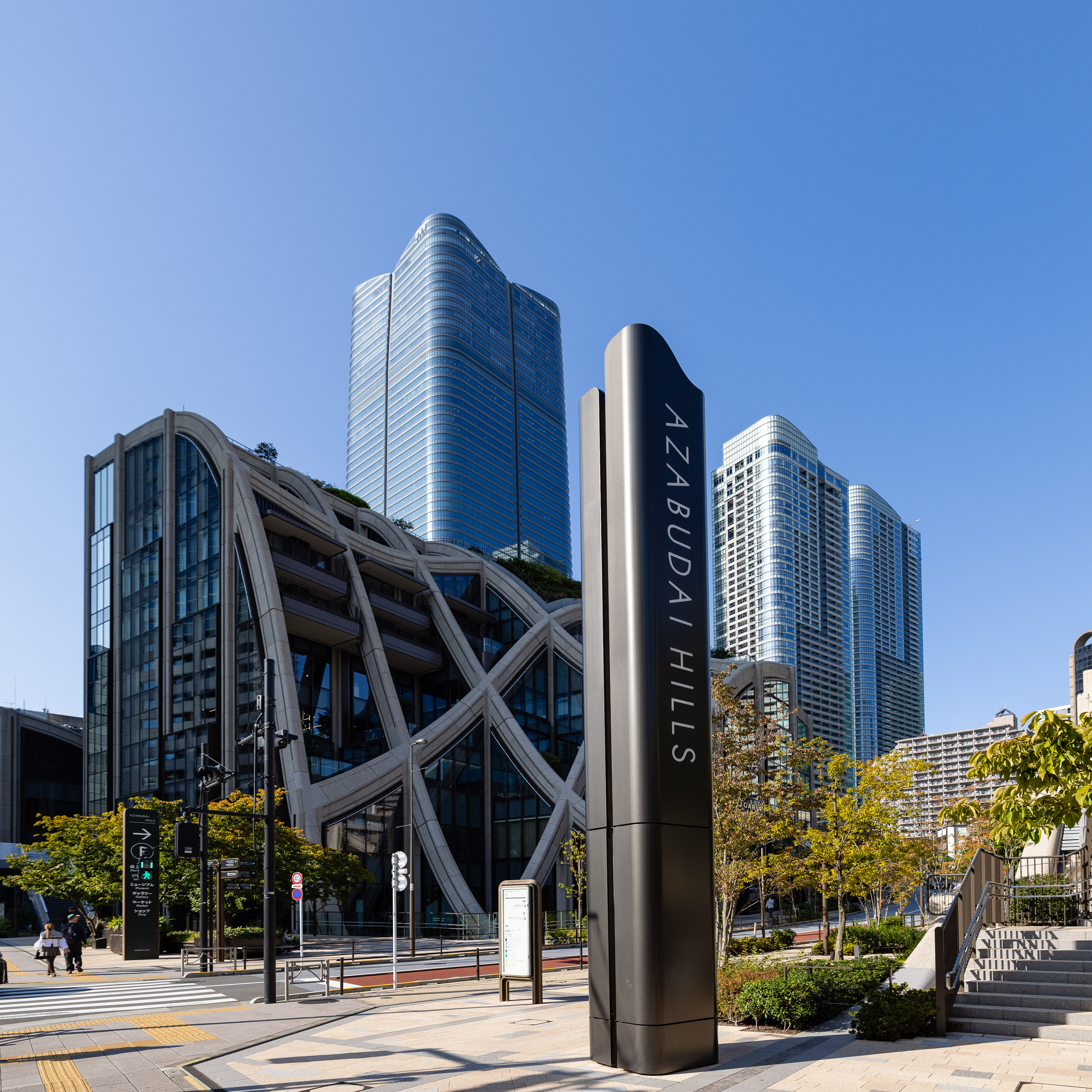
- Azabudai Hills in November 2025
- Former names: Toranomon-Azabudai District; Toranomon-Azabudai Project

Record height
- Tallest in Japan since 2023^{[I]}
- Preceded by: Abeno Harukas

General information
- Status: Completed
- Type: Mixed-use
- Architectural style: Modern; Neo-futurism
- Location: Minato, Tokyo, Japan
- Coordinates: 35°39′38″N 139°44′25″E
- Construction started: August 2019; 7 years ago
- Completed: October 2023; 3 years ago
- Cost: ¥640 billion ($5.3 billion)
- Owner: Mori Building
- Operator: Mori Building

Height
- Height: Mori JP Tower: 325.2 m (1,067 ft)
- Architectural: 325.2 m (1,067 ft) (Mori JP Tower); 262.8 m (862 ft) (Residence B Tower); 237.2 m (778 ft) (Residence A Tower)
- Roof: 323.1 m (1,060 ft)
- Top floor: 322 m (1,056 ft)
- Observatory: Sky Lobby (33rd floor, Mori JP Tower)

Technical details
- Structural system: Steel; Reinforced concrete Concrete encased steel
- Floor count: 64 (Mori JP Tower); 64 (Residence B Tower); 54 (Residence A Tower)
- Floor area: Total: 861,700 m^{2} (9,275,000 sq ft) Mori JP Tower: 461,774 m^{2} (4,970,490 sq ft) Residence B: 185,300 m^{2} (1,995,000 sq ft) Residence A: 169,000 m^{2} (1,820,000 sq ft)
- Grounds: 8.1 hectares (20 acres)

Design and construction
- Architecture firm: Pelli Clarke Pelli Architects; Heatherwick Studio
- Developer: Mori Building
- Main contractor: Mori Tower only: Obayashi Corporation

Other information
- Public transit: Kamiyachō Station; Toranomon-Gochōme; Azabudai Hills

Azabudai Hills (麻布台ヒルズ, Azabudai Hiruzu) is a complex of three skyscrapers in the Azabudai business district in the ward of Minato, Tokyo, Japan. Upon its completion in 2023, the Azabudai Hills Mori JP Tower in the development became the tallest building in Tokyo and Japan, surpassing Abeno Harukas in Osaka. The tower also has large floor spaces.

The complex was developed by the Mori Building Company at a project cost of about 640 billion yen ($5.3 billion). Negotiations with landowners and residents on the site started in March 1989, and the redevelopment was authorised by the government in September 2017. The construction started in August 2019 and was completed in 2023. The architectural firm Pelli Clarke Pelli Architects won the contract for the exterior design of the skyscrapers, while Sou Fujimoto and Thomas Heatherwick were commissioned to design the interiors and the exteriors of the low-level structures respectively.

The complex lies between sister Mori Building projects Roppongi Hills to the west, Toranomon Hills to the east, and Ark Hills to the north. The complex is also directly connected to the Kamiyachō Station of the Hibiya Line and both the Toranomon-Gochōme and Azabudai Hills bus stations of the Toei Bus, while also sharing a close distance to the Roppongi-itchōme Station of the Namboku Line from the northwest.

== Design ==
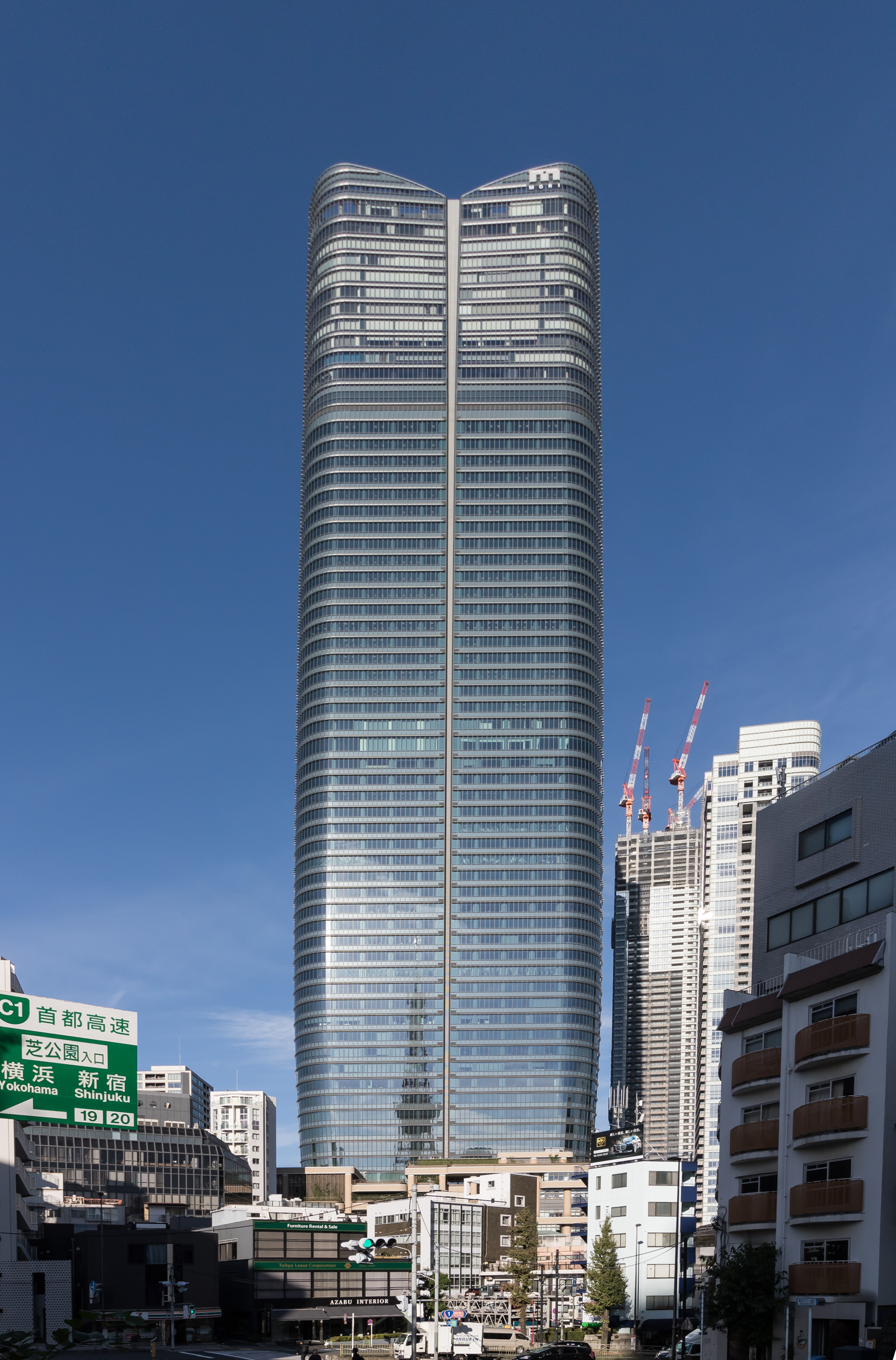
The tallest building of the complex, Azabudai Hills Mori JP Tower

Tentatively known as the Toranomon-Azabudai District or Toranomon-Azabudai Project, its official name, "Azabudai Hills", was announced by Mori Building on 14 December 2022. Azabudai Hills consists of three buildings: Azabudai Hills Mori JP Tower, Azabudai Hills Residence A and Azabudai Hills Residence B. Mori JP Tower, measuring 325.2 metres (1,067 ft) and featuring 64 floors, was the first supertall to be built in Tokyo. Its appearance was designed to complement the nearby Ark Hills Sengokuyama Mori Tower, a project by the same architect and developer located 250 metres (820 ft) away. The two accompanying buildings, Residence A and Residence B, measure 237.2 and 262.8 metres (778 and 862 ft) in height and feature 54 and 64 floors. The three skyscrapers were designed by Pelli Clarke Pelli Architects, the firm of Argentine architect César Pelli. Upon completion in 2023, the Azabudai Hills Mori JP Tower became the tallest building in Tokyo, surpassing the nearby Toranomon Hills Station Tower, as well as in Japan, surpassing Osaka's Abeno Harukas.

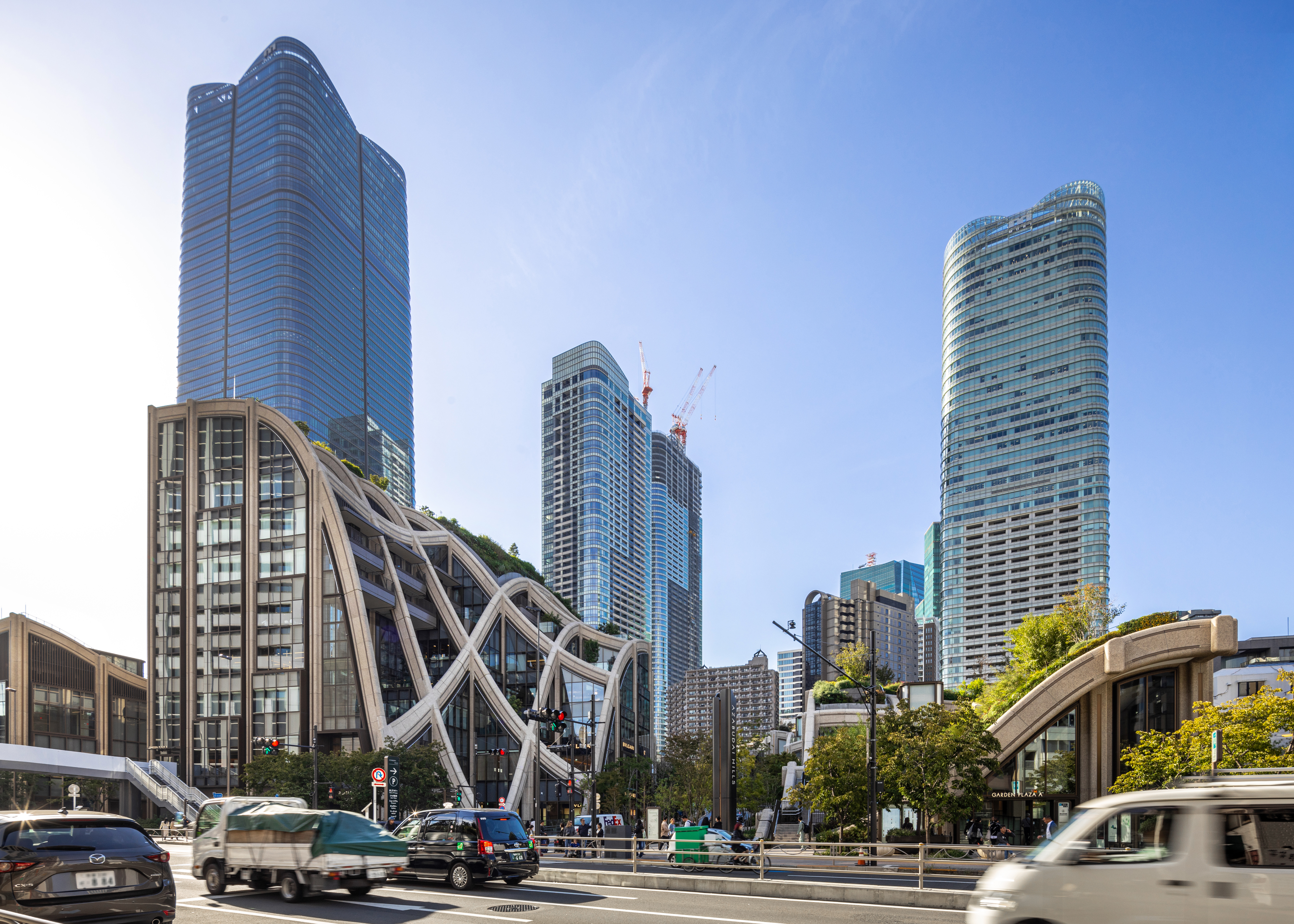
The low-rise shopping buildings called the Garden Plaza

Accompanying the skyscrapers are a series of low-rise buildings that creates a landscape pergola, designed by London-based Heatherwick Studio. The 8.1-hectare (20-acre) area is surrounded by lush greenery and features 24,000 m^{2} (260,000 sq ft) of green space, including a 6,000 m^{2} (65,000 sq ft) central square, 214,500 m^{2} (2,309,000 sq ft) of office spaces, 3,300 m^{2} (36,000 sq ft) of two-level working space named the Hills House located at the 33rd and 34th floors, and 23,000 m^{2} (250,000 sq ft) of retail spaces, which features 150 shops. According to Mori, the design embodies the concept of a "modern urban village". Additionally, 9,000 m^{2} (97,000 sq ft) of cultural facilities will also be included. The complex is also a Platinum-level LEED-certification in two categories, the LEED Core and Shell Development (BD+C) and the LEED Neighborhood Development (ND).

== Usage ==
The project has a total floor area of 861,700 m^{2} (9,275,000 sq ft), including 213,900 m^{2} (2,302,000 sq ft) of office space and approximately 1,400 residential units. The main tower is the largest skyscraper by floor area in the world. The main building, known as the Mori JP Tower, contains office space in lower and middle floors, while residential spaces will be located on the upper floors, from the 56th to the 65th floor, which is named the Aman Residences Tokyo. Some media outlets have reported that the largest units of the residential floors in the main tower were sold for approximately 20 billion yen each. The complex's low-rise residential complex is the Azabudai Hills Garden Plaza Residence, which features 31 residential units located on the 6th to 8th floors of the Garden Plaza B Mall.

The lower floors also include a supermarket and a multi-language child care facility, as well as an international school, The British School in Tokyo. It is projected that the complex will house offices for about 20,000 workers and residences for about 3,500 people.

== Gallery ==
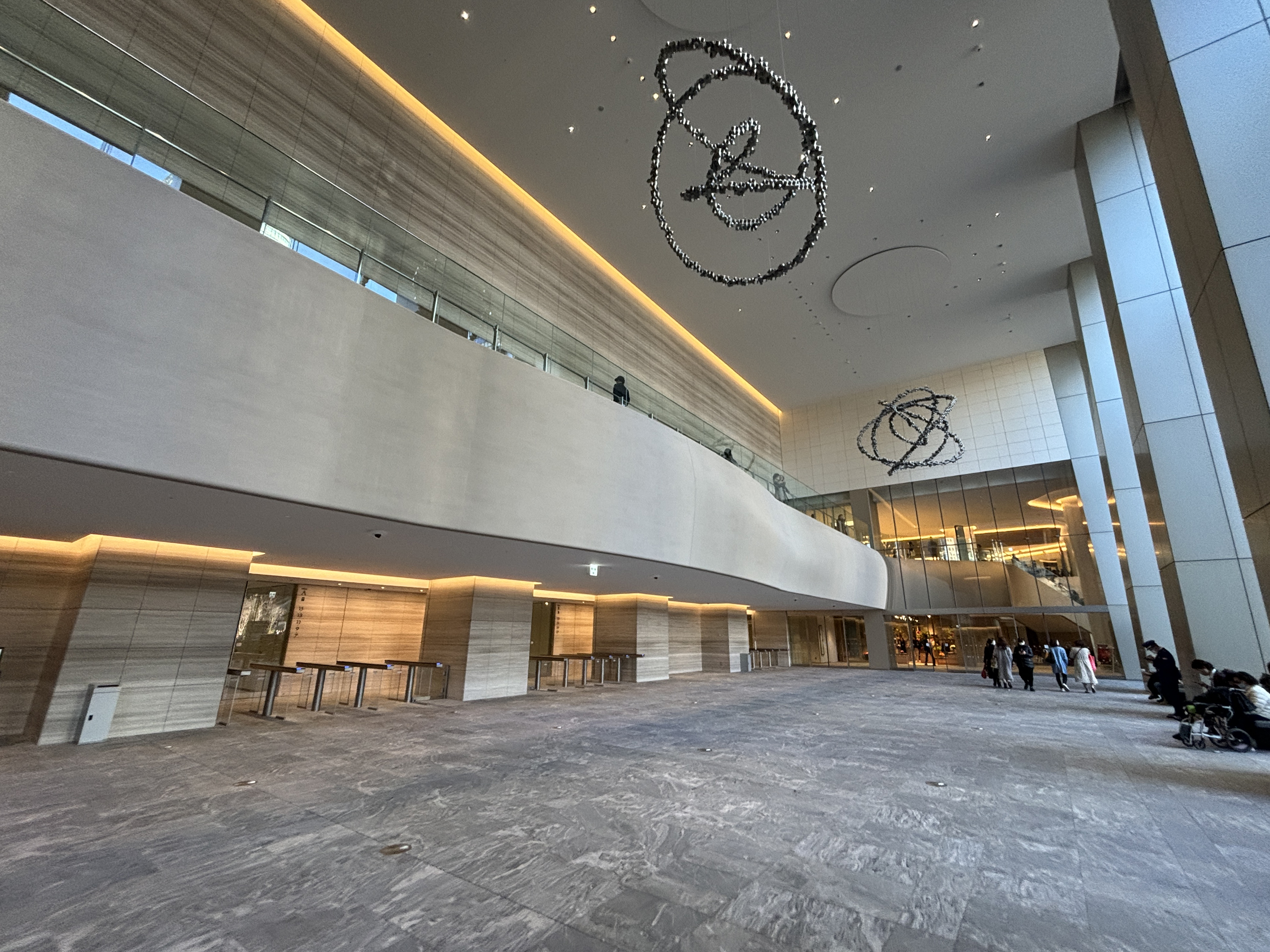
Tower Plaza Mori JP Tower Office Lobby

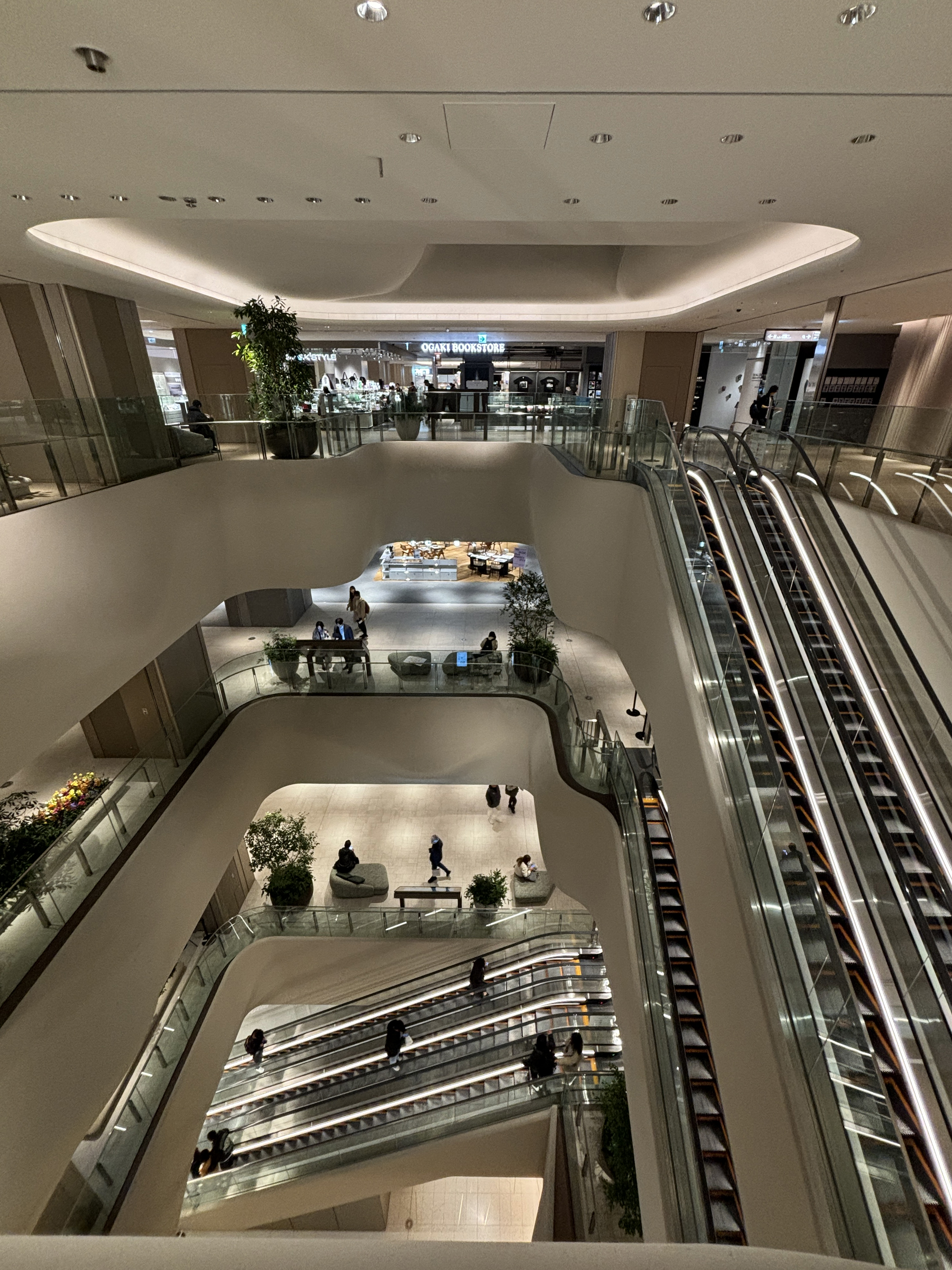
Atrium of Tower Plaza Mori JP Tower

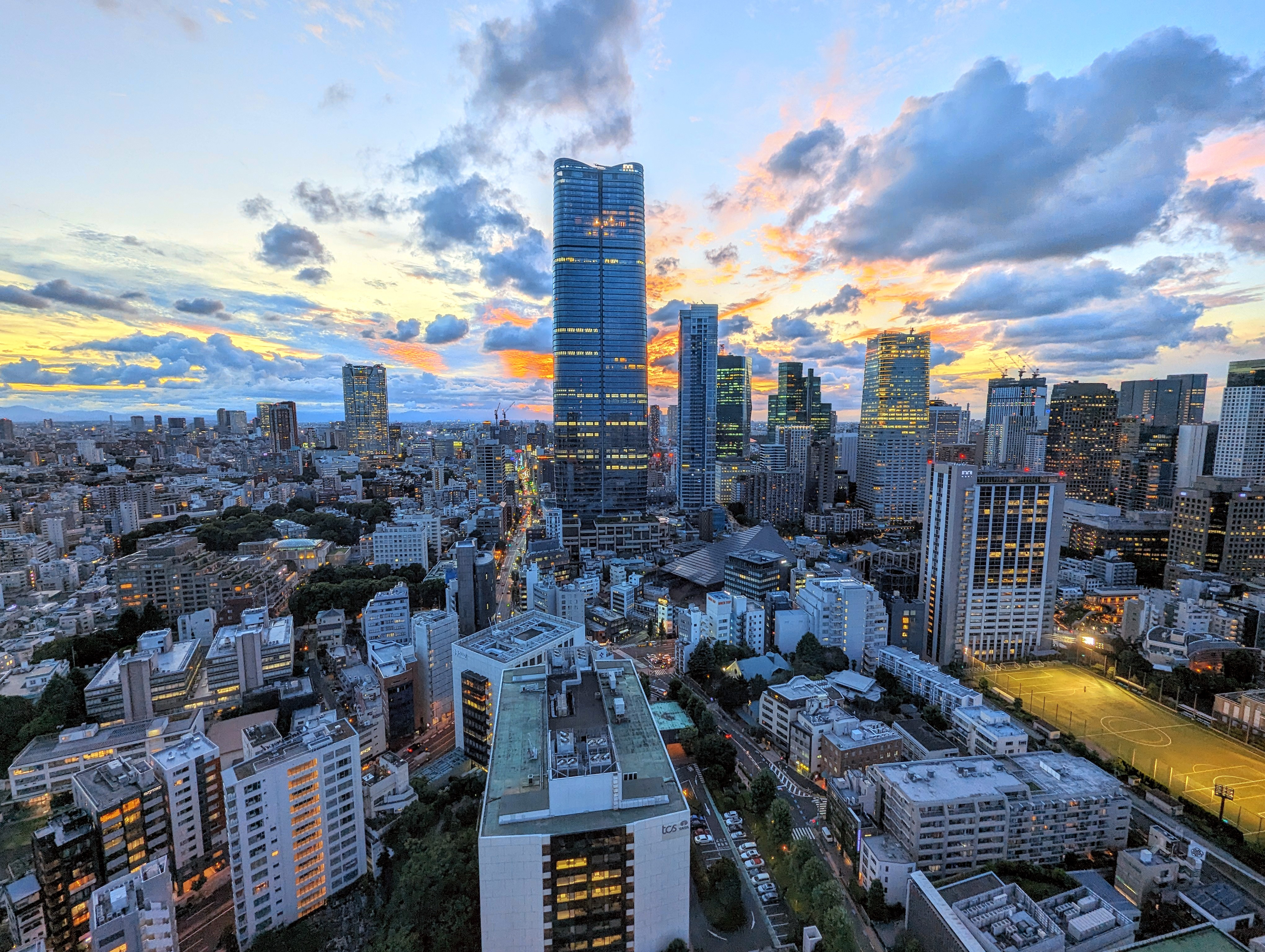
Azabudai Hills Mori JP Tower from Tokyo Tower, Minato City

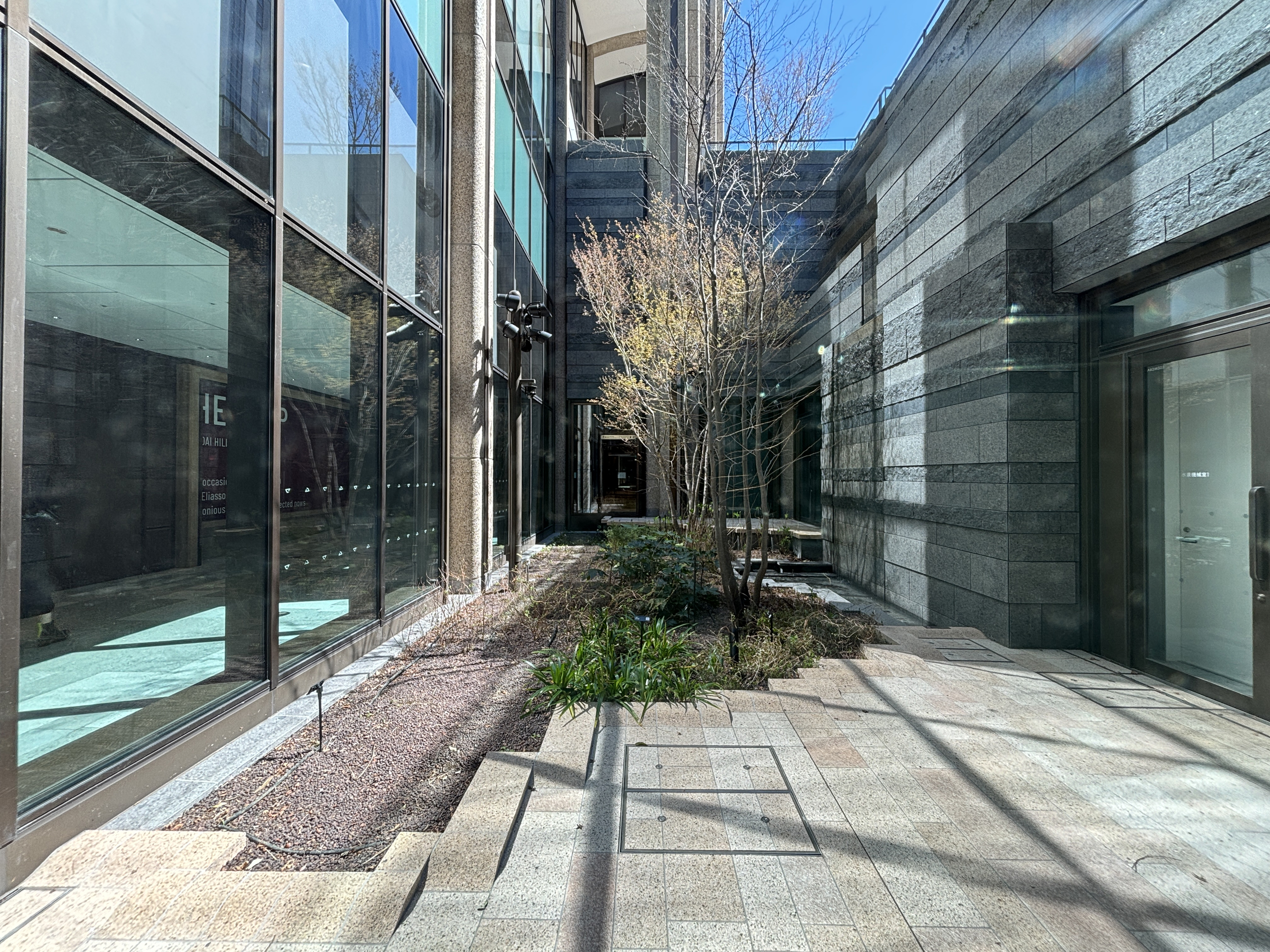
Azabudai Hills Gallery courtyard in B1

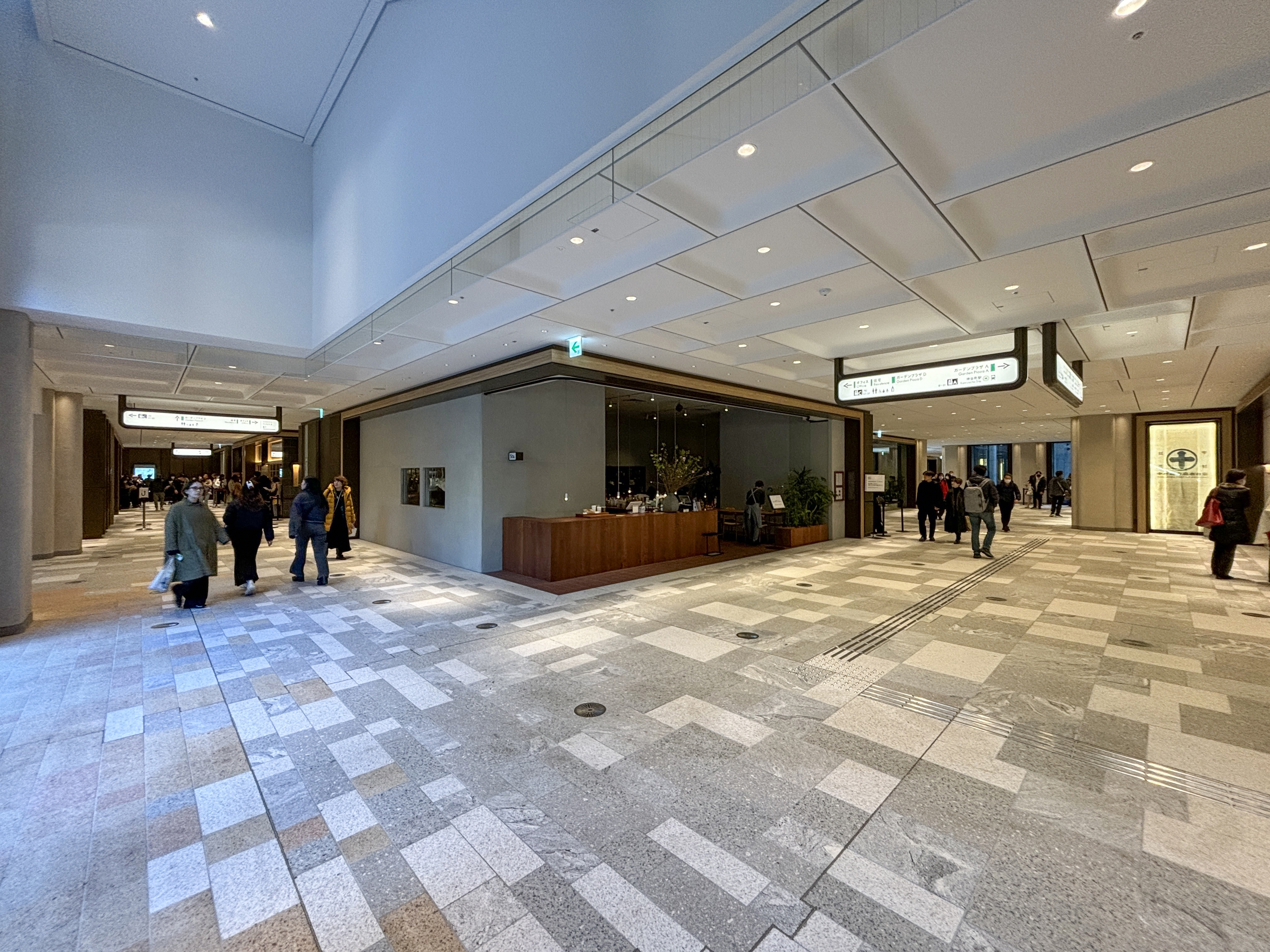
Restaurants in Garden Plaza B B1

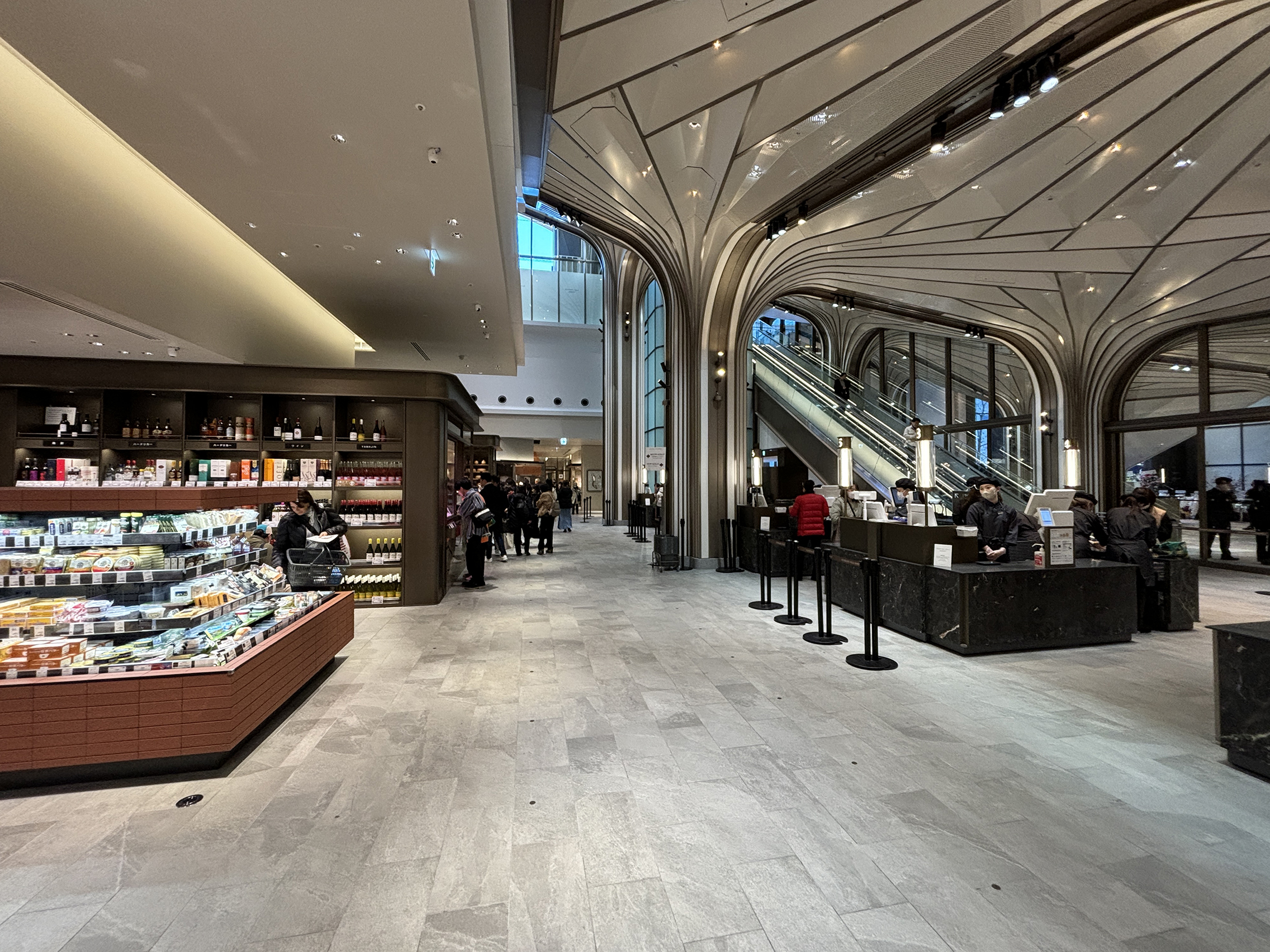
Azabudai Hills Market in B1

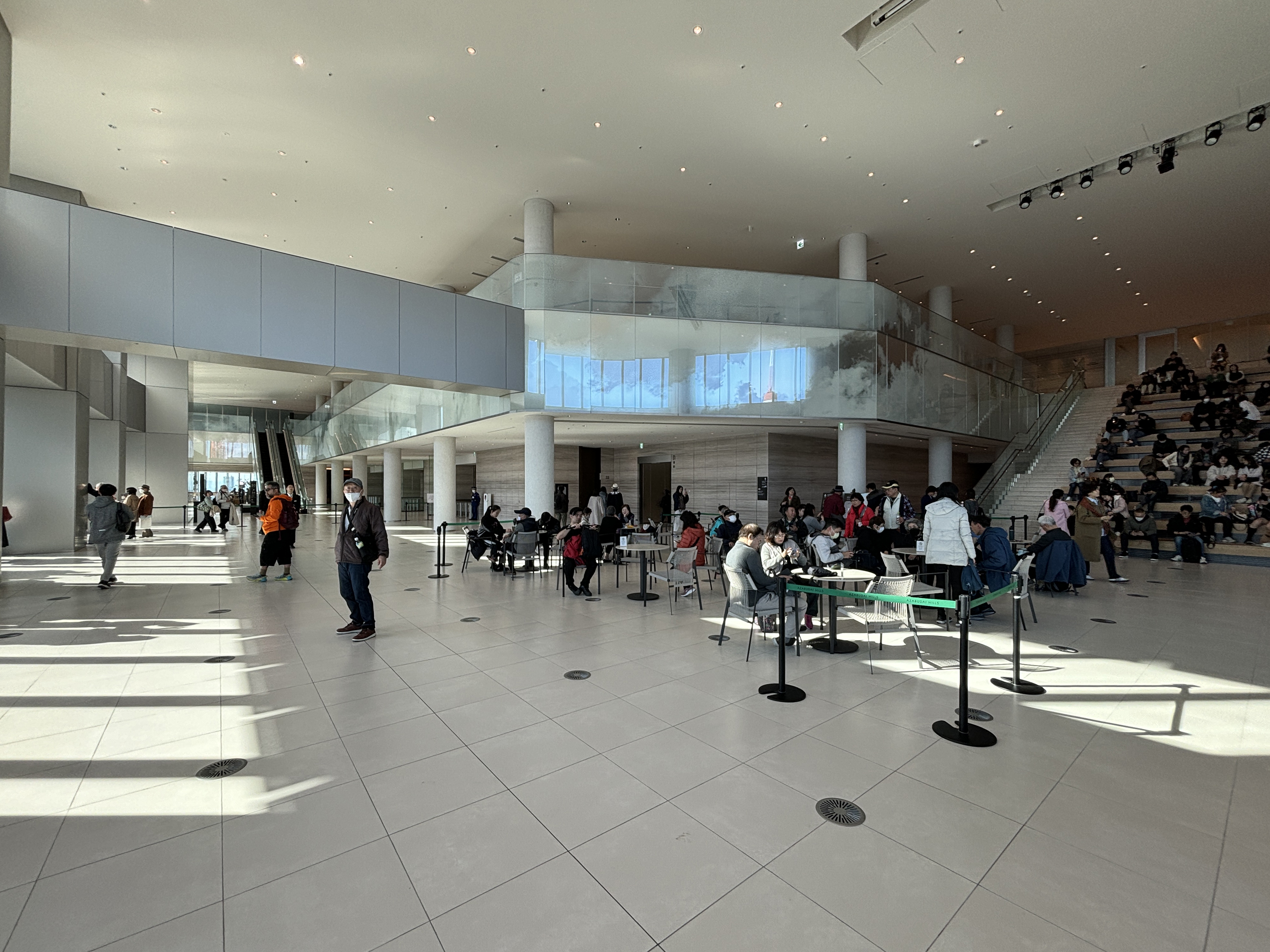
Tower Plaza Mori JP Tower Lobby in 33F

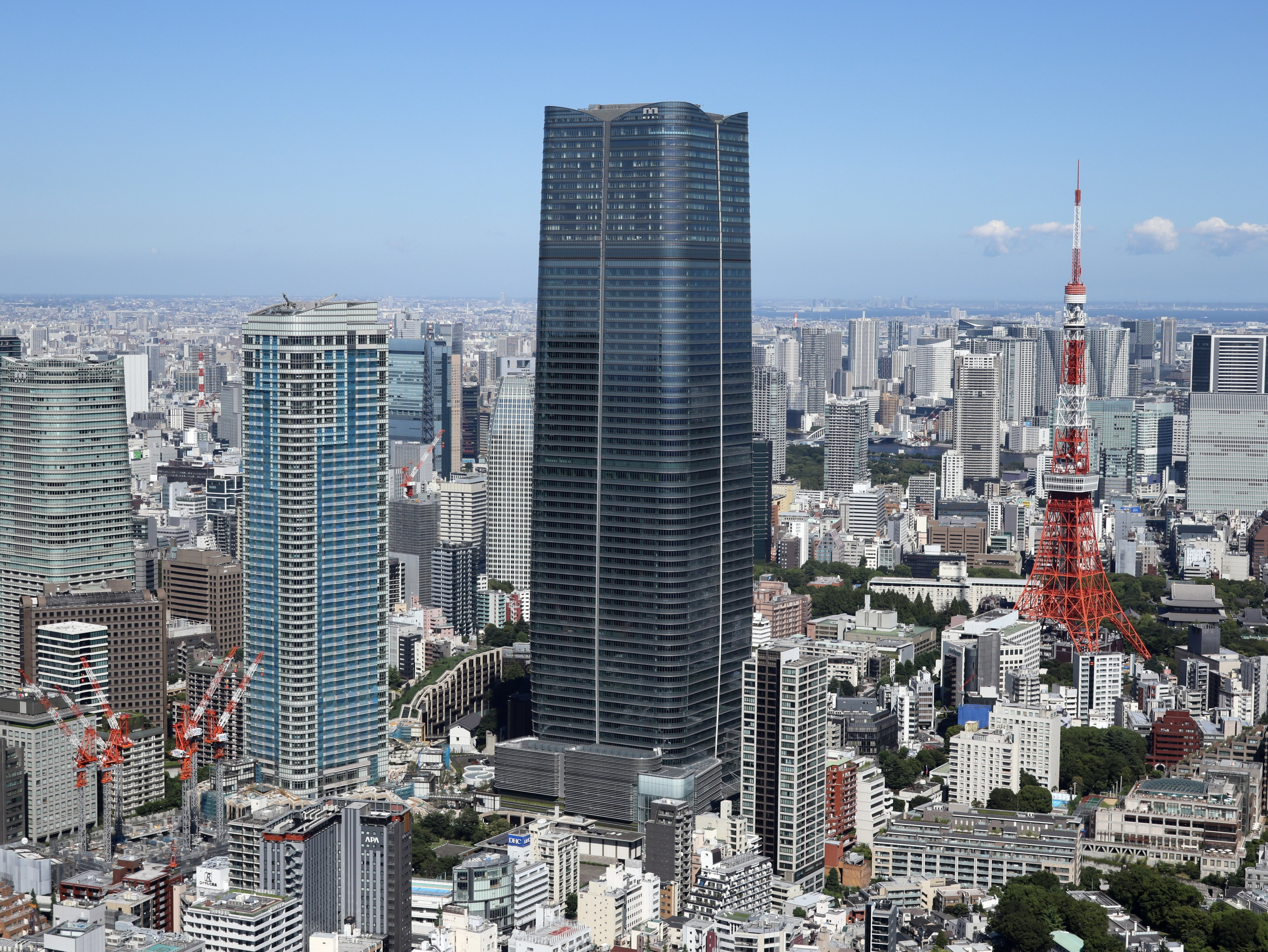
Azabudai Hills in July 2023

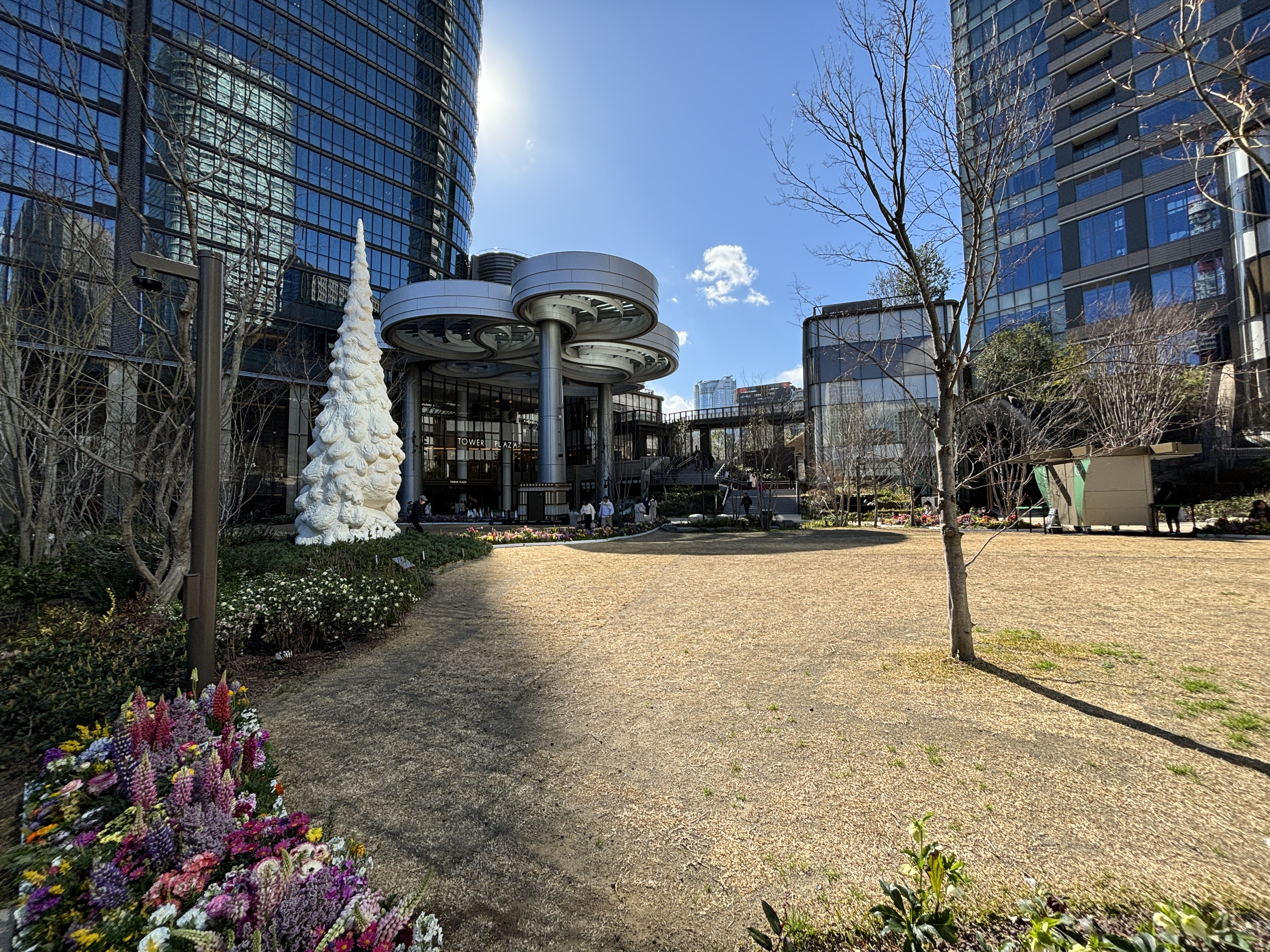
Central Green in Azabudai Hills

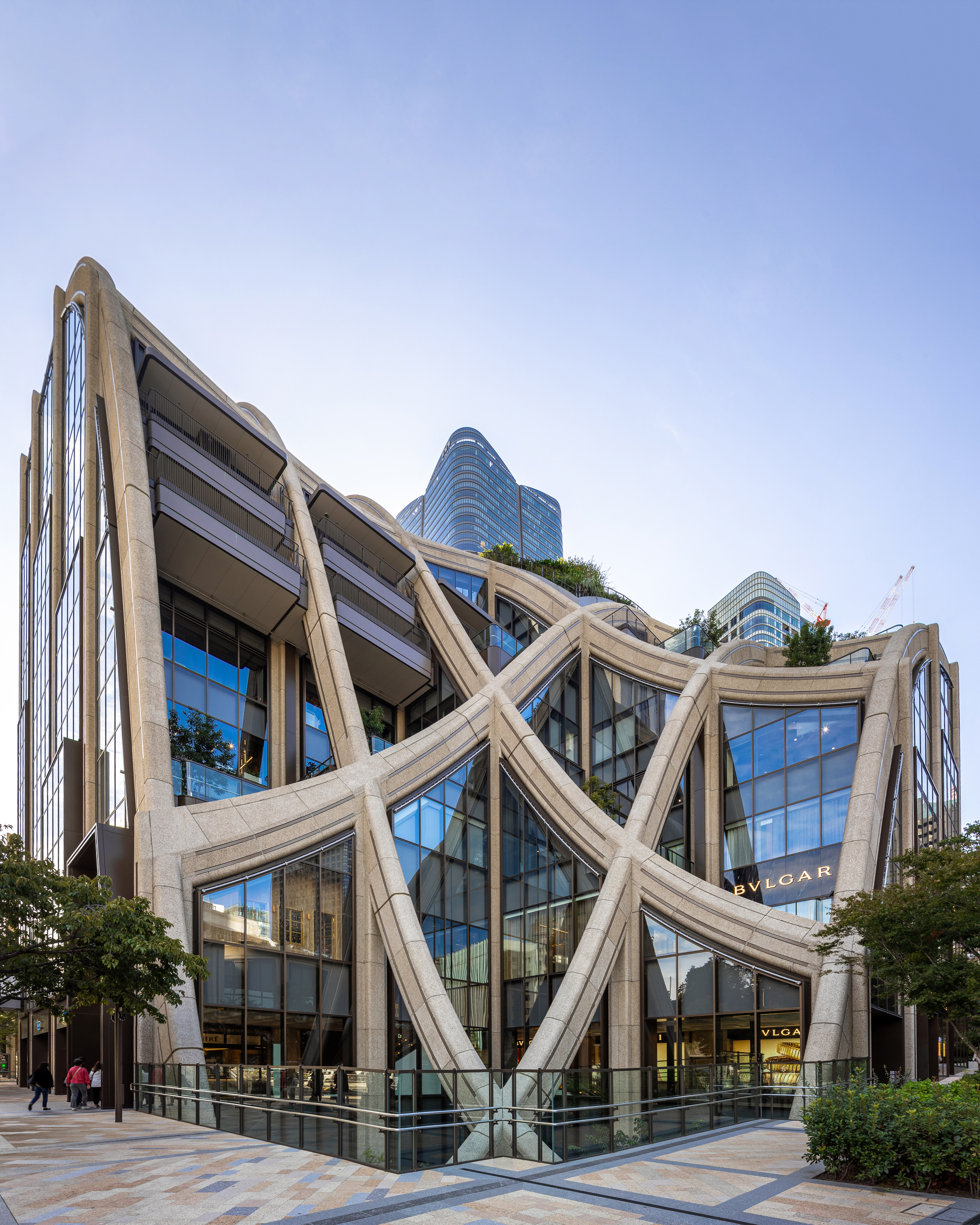
A closer look of the Garden Plaza A Mall

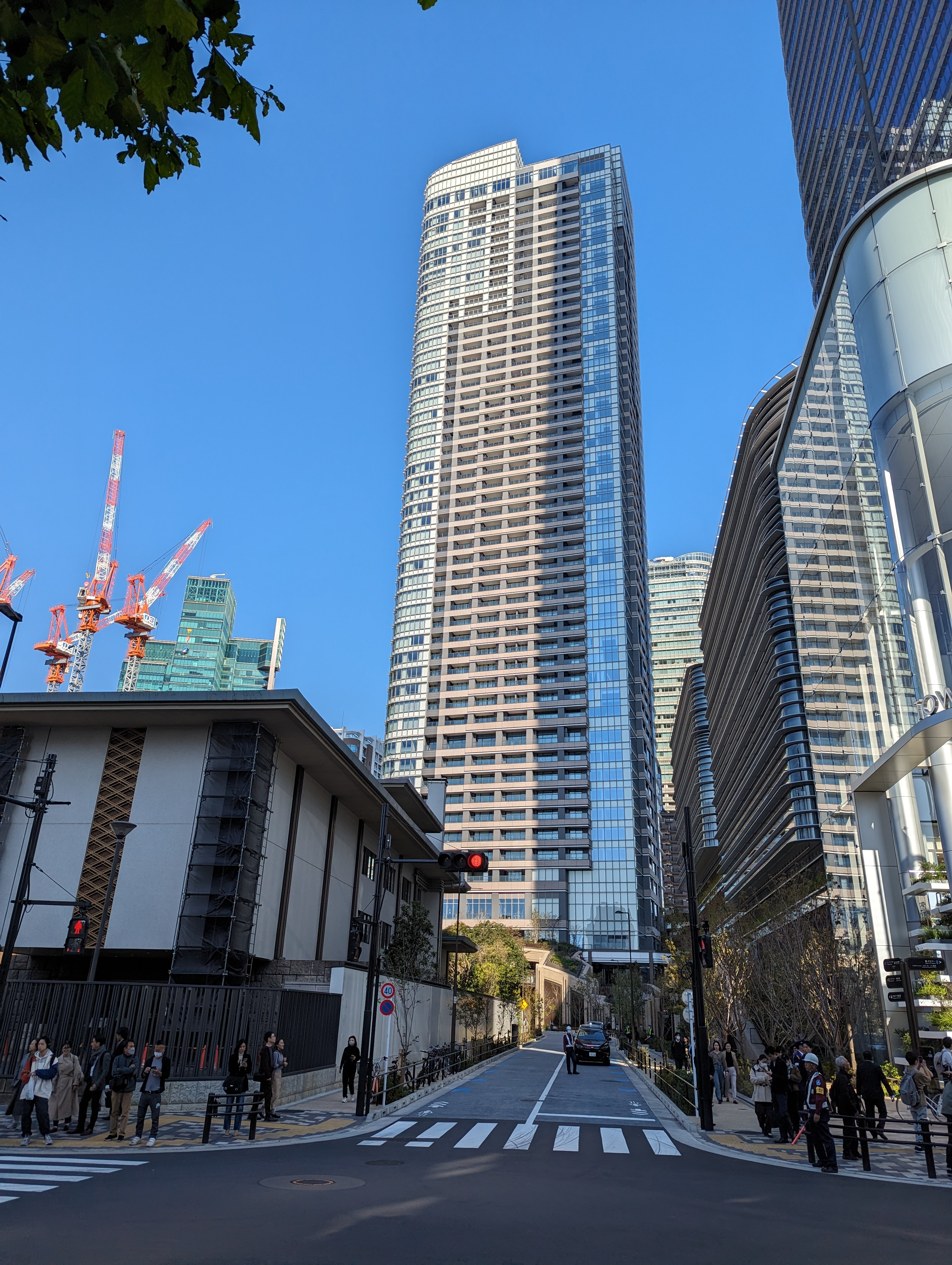
The Azabudai Hills Residence A Tower

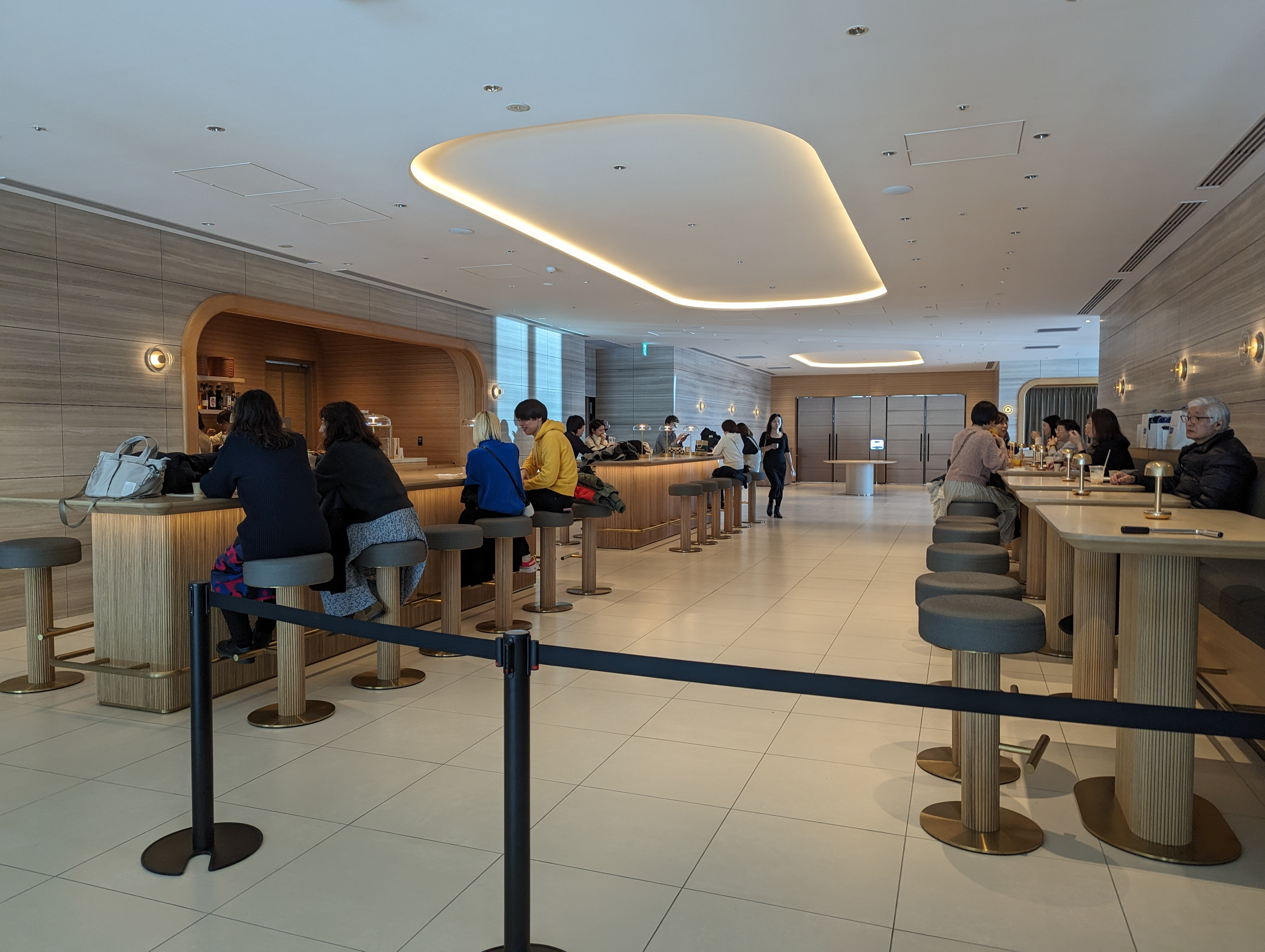
Hills House Azabudai at Mori JP Tower 33F

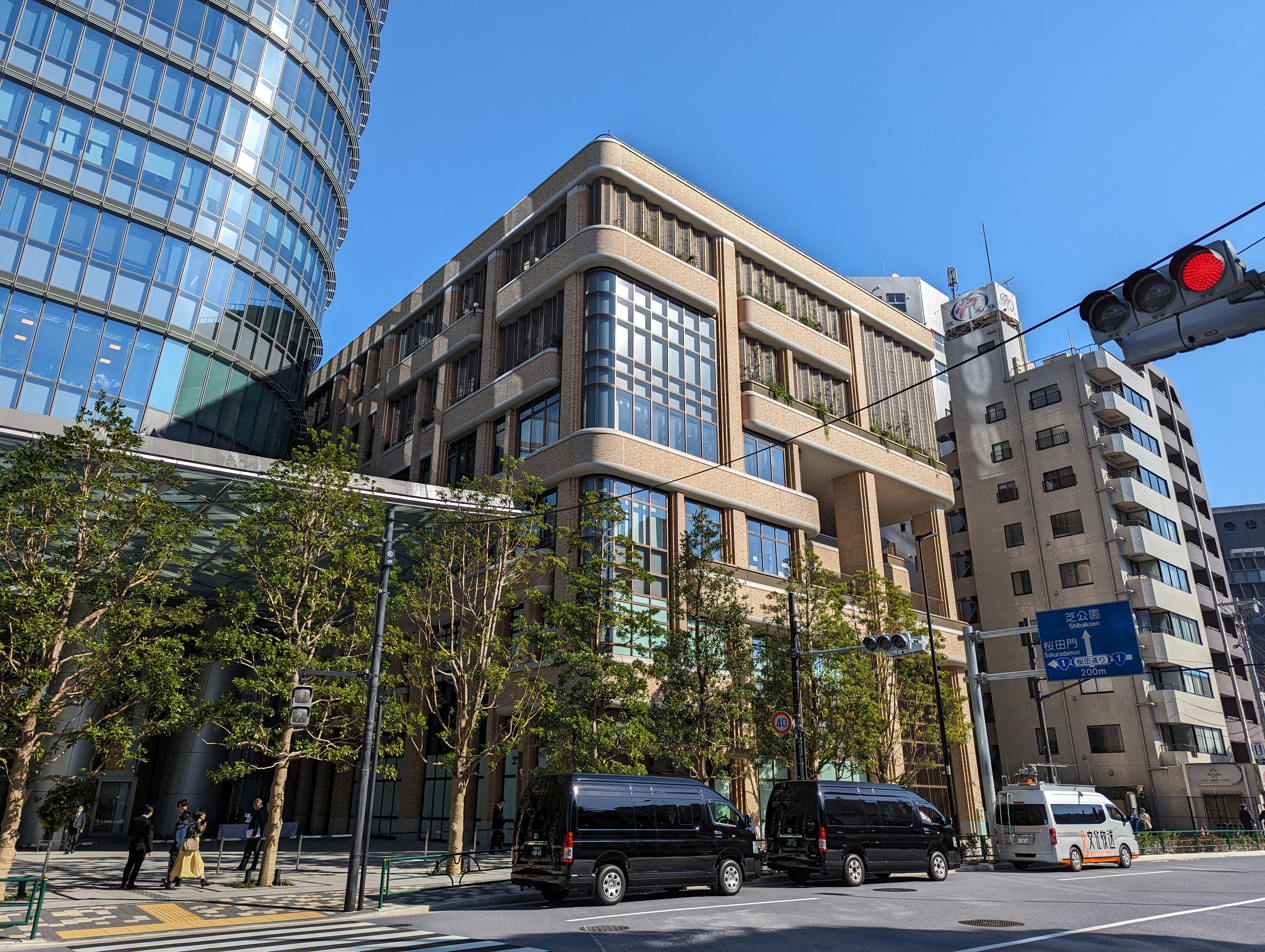
The British School in Tokyo, Azabudai Hills Campus

== See also ==
- List of tallest buildings in Japan
- List of tallest buildings in Tokyo
