= Ark Hills =

Office complex in Tokyo, Japan

- アークヒルズ

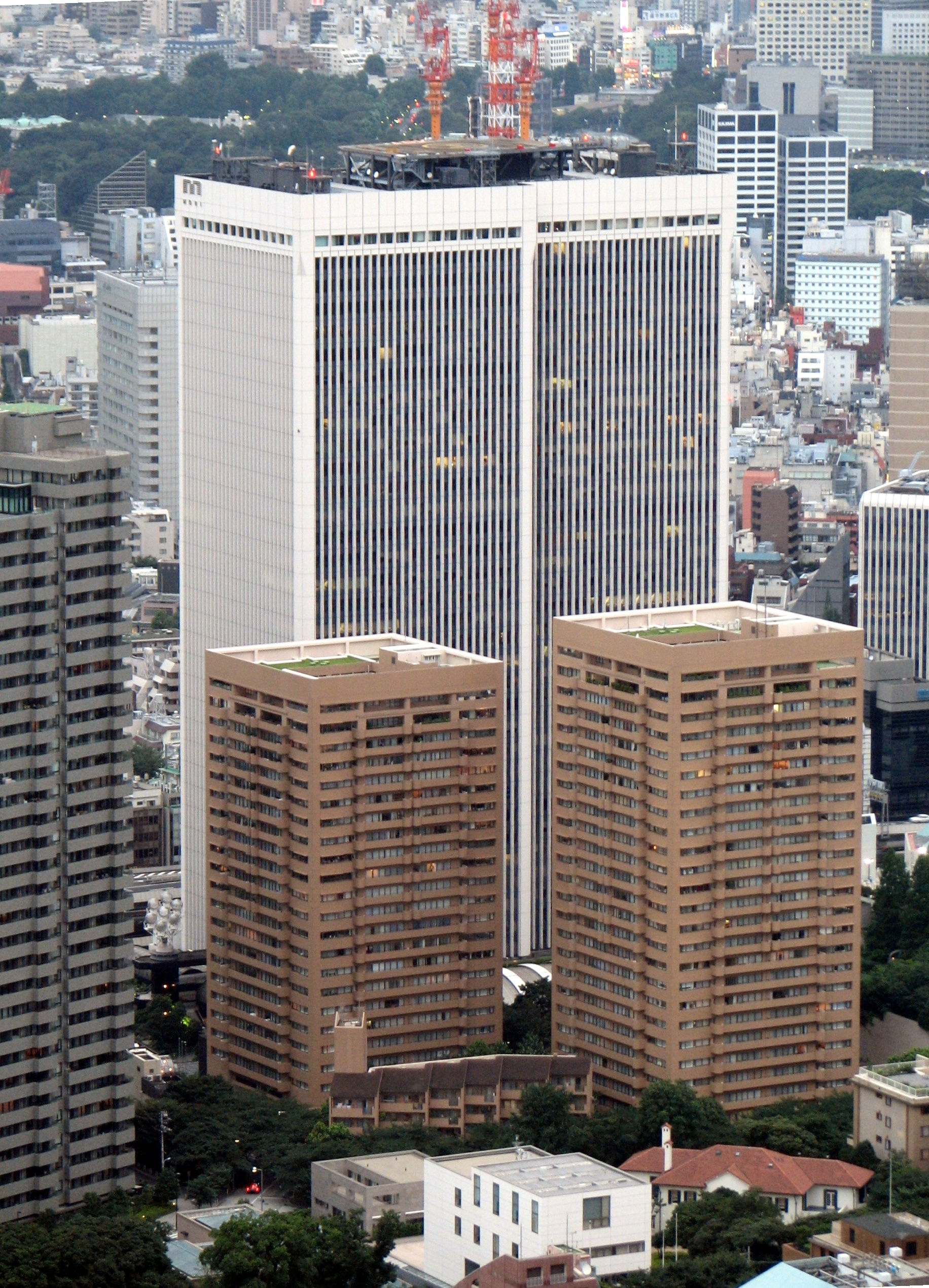
- Ark Hills (brown) as seen from the Tokyo Tower

General information
- Status: Completed
- Type: Mixed-use, High Rise
- Location: Akasaka, Minato, Tokyo, Japan, Tokyo, Japan
- Coordinates: 35.6670°N 139.7407°E
- Construction started: November 1983; 43 years ago
- Completed: March 1986; 40 years ago (Complex); January 31, 2012; 14 years ago (Ark Hills Front Tower); August 2012; 14 years ago (Ark Hills Sengokuyama Mori Tower); August 2013; 13 years ago (Ark Hills South Tower)
- Owner: Mori Building
- Operator: Mori Building

Height
- Height: Ark Hills Sengokuyama Mori Tower: 206.7 m (678 ft)
- Architectural: 206.7 m (678 ft) (Ark Hills Sengokuyama Mori Tower); 153.34 m (503 ft) (Ark Mori Building); 133 m (436 ft) (ANA InterContinental Tokyo); 108 m (354 ft) (Ark Hills South Tower); 106 m (348 ft) (Ark Hills Front Tower); 76.69 m (252 ft) (Ark Towers East Tower); 67.99 m (223 ft) (Ark Towers West Tower)
- Roof: 206.7 m (678 ft) (Ark Hills Sengokuyama Mori Tower)

Technical details
- Floor count: 51 (Ark Hills Sengokuyama Mori Tower); 37 (Mori Building); 36 (ANA InterContinental Tokyo); 22 (Ark Hills Front Tower); 20 (Ark Hills South Tower); 25 (Ark Towers East Tower); 22 (Ark Towers West Tower); 9 (Ark Hills Executive Tower)
- Floor area: Total Floor Area: 360,608.87 m^{2} (3,881,561.6 sq ft) Ark Hills Sengokuyama Mori Tower: 143,462 m^{2} (1,544,210 sq ft) Mori Tower:181,833 m^{2} (1,957,230 sq ft) ANA InterContinental Tokyo: 98,331.68 m^{2} (1,058,433.4 sq ft) Ark Hills Front Tower: 24,823.41 m^{2} (267,197.0 sq ft) Ark Hills South Tower: 53,043 m^{2} (570,950 sq ft)
- Grounds: 5.6 hectares (14 acres)

Design and construction
- Architecture firm: General Site Master Plan: Irie Miyake Architects & Engineers (IMA); Ark Hills Sengokuyama Mori Tower only: Pelli Clarke Pelli Architects
- Developer: Mori Building
- Main contractor: Kajima Corporation (Ark Mori Building); Taisei Corporation ANA Intercontinental Tokyo only); Takenaka Corporation (Ark Hills Executive Tower only)

Other information
- Public transit: Kamiyachō Station; Tameike-sannō Station; Roppongi-itchōme Station Akasaka Ark Hills

Ark Hills (アークヒルズ, Āku Hiruzu), also known as Akasaka Ark Hills, is a 5.6 hectares (14 acres) mixed-use development complex owned and developed by Mori Building Company in the Akasaka district in Minato, Tokyo. Opened in 1986, the complex is the first and largest private urban redevelopment complex of its kind and includes the Ark Hills Sengokuyama Mori Tower, the Ark Mori Building, the ANA InterContinental Tokyo Hotel, the world-class Suntory Hall concert hall, a TV studio and several apartment buildings. TV Asahi still uses its former headquarters as an annex for some of its departments and subsidiaries while the network's headquarters themselves were moved to the nearby building designed by Fumihiko Maki in 2003. The complex is also known for its annual autumn festival known as the Ark Hills Music Week, that includes music, dancing, food, art and shopping.

== Etymology ==
The name "Ark" is derived from the location of the complex, at the intersection of the Akasaka, Roppongi and Kasumigaseki districts. Another explanation is that the name stands for Akasaka and Roppongi knot. The complex's name also took inspiration to the land's topography as the development sits on a sloping hillside in Toranomon, giving the name hills to be added in the name of the development. The name Ark Hills also served as the foundation of other related mixed-use developments owned by Mori Building Company that bears the Hills name as part of the company's branding for its other large scale "mini-city" mixed-use development projects such as the Atago Green Hills in 2001, Roppongi Hills in 2003, Omotesando Hills in 2005, Toranomon Hills in 2014, and the Azabudai Hills in 2023.

== History ==
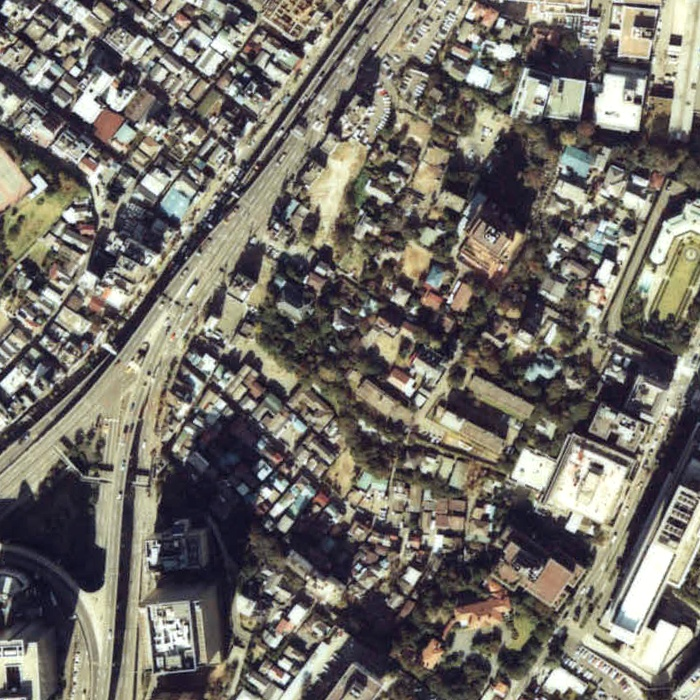
An aerial photograph of the site of the Ark Hills development, taken on November 6, 1979

The Ark Hills redevelopment plan was first initiated in 1967 when Mori Building Company purchased the 5.6 hectares (14 acres) from various private-owned land plots. The land that used to occupy the current Ark Hills development formerly served as a densely populated hillside residential neighborhood, surrounded by various religious structures such as the Yosenji Temple and the Reinanzaka Church. In November 1969, the Mori Building Company laid out a proposal for the construction of a 33-story high-rise building planned development in the area. In March 1971, the Tokyo Metropolitan Government has conducted a survey on the site for the feasibility and suitability of the project and was later deemed as suitable for development.

In May 1971, the development later encountered massive opposition from locals who reside the land, where they also place posters opposing the development. Despite the opposition, the project gained support from both the religious groups and eventually the Tokyo Metropolitan Government, yet due to the difficulty of gaining further approval from the parishioners of the Reinanzaka Church, as well as the worshippers from the Yosenji Temple and later led to the withdrawal of support of the religious organizations. The development of the project was delayed and encountered significant problems that caused problems for the construction of the complex. In April 1972, the Minato Ward drew up a master plan for urban redevelopment.

In 1973 the Minato Ward published the Basic Plan for Redevelopment, which served as the framework for the redevelopment project, and also includes the density, layout, green spaces, and zoning of the future complex. In 1978, the Akasaka-Roppongi Area Redevelopment Preparatory Association was established and on the following year in 1979, the urban plan decision was eventually announced. In 1982, the Akasaka-Roppongi Area Urban District Redevelopment Association was approved and later laid the plan for the area's redevelopment. In early 1983 the rights conversion plan was approved and later led to the construction of the complex in November 1983. The first property to be completed in the complex is the TV Asahi Arc Broadcasting Center, which was completed in September 1985, while the development of the entire complex was completed in March 1986 after 17 years with the completion of the Ark Mori Building and the Ark East and West Towers. The completion of the complex was later followed by the completion and opening of other surrounding properties within the same year, such as the ANA InterContinental Tokyo, which was opened in June 1986, and the full opening of the Suntory Hall on October 12, 1986.

In the later years after the completion of the complex, additional buildings were built within the complex and eventually expanded the development's floor area, such as the Ark Hills Executive Tower in March 1999, and was later further expanded to cater more buildings within the development. The latest of these modern developments were the Ark Hills Front Tower on January 31, 2012, the Ark Hills Sengokuyama Mori Tower in August 2012, and the Ark Hills South Tower in August 2013.

== Buildings ==
=== Ark Mori Building ===
The Ark Mori Building is a 37-storey office building and rises at 153.34 m (503 ft) tall. Built and completed in March 1986, the tower serves as the first office tower to be completed within the complex and also as one of the country's first smart office towers and features a dual-tower configuration in its design with independent disaster prevention systems. The tower features a contemporary architectural design with its facade featuring sleek and energy-efficient windows and carbon fiber-reinforced concrete placed in vertical mullions and curved top edges. The tower also features a protruding design from the center of the tower while sharing a close resemblance to the design of the World Trade Center Twin Towers from afar. The tower also has retail, commercial and restaurant spaces on the ground floor to the third floor while the 4th floor to the 37th floor features office spaces. The tower's office tenants include the AViC Co., Ltd. and Bank of Italy both having office spaces on the 19th floor, DOCOMO Innovation Village, Roland Berger, iStyle, Impact HD Inc., Kaneka Corporation Tokyo Head Office, Japan External Trade Organization (JETRO), Max Law Firm, Monex Group, ReadHub Co., Ltd., Tyton | Capital Advisors, and Works Human Intelligence Co., Ltd.

The tower also features a heliport on the roof of the Building, which was used to provide direct flights between Ark Hills and the Narita International Airport (approximately 20 minutes), until it was discontinued on December 1, 2015.

=== Ark Towers ===
The Ark Towers are a pair of luxury residential towers located adjacent to the Ark Mori Building, the Ark Karajan Place, and the Ark Hills South Tower. The two towers are named the Ark Towers East which stands at 76.69 m (252 ft) and 25 storeys high, and the Ark Towers West rising at 67.99 m (223 ft) and 22 storeys high. The residential complex were completed in March 1986 and sits on a 6,671.46 m^{2} (71,811.0 sq ft) of land, which has a total combined unit count of 405 units split into 260 units on the Ark Towers East and 145 units on the Ark Towers West. The towers also feature serviced apartment units, a resident-only Hills Spa, a swimming pool, a Jacuzzi, a sauna, a gym, a resident and guest-only restaurant and dining lounge, and an indoor golf simulator.

=== ANA Intercontinental Tokyo ===
The ANA Intercontinental Tokyo is a 5-star hotel located within the northern end of the complex. Built and completed in June 1986 as the ANA Tokyo Hotel with Taisei Corporation serving as the main contractor of the project, the hotel is owned and maintained by the IHG ANA Hotel Group, a joint venture company between the ANA Holdings Inc. and the British hospitality brand InterContinental Hotels Group (IHG) in October 2006. The hotel has 36 floors with 500 parking spaces spread out in 3 basement parking levels and rises at a height of 133 m (436 ft), while having a total floor area of 98,331.68 m^{2} (1,058,433.4 sq ft). The hotel features an "A-shared" building design with contemporary architectural styles, wherein the rooms feature an origami-patterned interiors with Japanese aesthetics, while its meeting rooms are designed with modern Japanese designs.

ANA Intercontinental Tokyo has a total of 801 rooms including 30 suites and ranges from the Classic Room, the Premium Room, the Classic / Premium Club Lounge Access room, the Mizu Suite, the Sora Suite, the Tsuki Suite, the Kaze Suite, the Tori Suite, the Hana Suite, and the Miyabi Suite, which serves as the largest room suites of the hotel. The hotel also has a retail lobby at the ground floor, 12 restaurants located within the second and third floors, and 20 small to large meeting halls for various events The ANA Intercontinental also features a Concierge Gallery & Lounge with a meeting room, an open-air swimming pool, a beauty salon, a health and fitness center, the THANN sanctuary spa, the Go Salon "Ranca", and a car rental office.

=== Suntory Hall ===
The Suntory Hall is a concert venue located in the middle of the complex and is flanked by the Ark Karajan Place and the Ark Towers on the south and the Mori Building on the west. The concert venue consists of two halls, the Main Hall which features the concert pipe organ located in the centre rear of the Hall, and the Small Hall for smaller events. The concert hall also consists of The Foyer, a private lounge for VIPs and guests, and also features an open-air landscape gardens at the concert venue's rooftop known as the Four Seasons Garden.

=== Ark Hills Executive Tower ===
The Ark Hills Executive Tower is a 9-storey residential building located across the Suntory Hall. Built and completed in 1999 with Takenaka Corporation served as the main contractor. The building has 9 floors with 2 basement parking levels and has a total of 46 units. The building sits on a 1,269.33 m^{2} (13,663.0 sq ft) of land and features a lounge, meeting rooms, storage spaces and a rooftop garden.

=== Ark Hills Front Tower ===
The Ark Hills Front Tower is a 106 m (348 ft) mixed-use high rise building located across the main 4.06 hectares (10.0 acres) complex. Standing at 22 storeys high, the building was completed and opened on January 31, 2012, and has 24,823.41 m^{2} (267,197.0 sq ft) of floor area. The tower has a basement level, a retail area at the ground level, elevated parking parking spaces at the 3rd floor to the 5th floor, residential units known as the Ark Hills Front Tower RoP at the 6th to 12th floors, and office spaces at the 2nd and 13th to 22nd floor. The building is the first building in the country to be installed with earthquake sway suppression devices installed at the 3rd floor, and also features a sky garden at the topmost floor.

=== Ark Hills Sengokuyama Mori Tower ===
The Ark Hills Sengokuyama Mori Tower is a mixed-use skyscraper located 2 corners across the main complex. Rising at 206.7 m (678 ft), the 51-storey tower is the tallest building within the complex and has 143,462 m^{2} (1,544,210 sq ft) of floor area and a land area of roughly 2 hectares (4.9 acres), which includes the tower's open spaces. Construction of the tower began in October 2009 with Obayashi Corporation serving as the main contractor, and was completed in August 2012. The tower consists of 4 basement parking levels, retail spaces at the ground floor to the second floor, residential units at the 3rd floor to the 24th floor, and office spaces at the 25th to 47th floors.

The architecture of the tower features a modernist style with a mixture of glass curtain walls, steel frames, and stoned balconies inspired from "a flower blooming atop a verdant hill", which features "inverted cone-like" curvatures on the upper levels of the tower and is intersected with a rectangular prism, giving the tower a "soft shape". The tower's office spaces also feature automatic LED dimmers andpillarless spaces that allows flexibility and proper space layouts to the tenants. The tower also philosophizes a "vertical garden city" concept with a green coverage rate of 45.24%, which integrates the tower to 4,000 m^{2} (43,000 sq ft) green urban spaces such as the 3,000 m^{2} (32,000 sq ft) Sengokuyama Plaza located on the tower's western area and the 1,000 m^{2} (11,000 sq ft) Kogera no Niwa in the tower's southern flank, which features indoor ponds and lush greenery.

The tower also houses the Ark Hills Sengokuyama Residence, a 243-unit luxury condominium complex located on the 3rd floor to the 24th floor of the tower, and features a guesthouse, a view lounge, a swimming pool, a roof deck, and the Hills Spa.

=== Ark Hills South Tower ===
The Ark Hills South Tower is a 20-storey office building located across the southern end of the main complex. Rising at 108 m (354 ft) high, the tower features a sleek contemporary design while having a glass and steel facade with external louvers and low-energy double-glazed glass panels. The tower has 53,043 m^{2} (570,950 sq ft) of total floor area and has 1,883 m^{2} (20,270 sq ft) of standard leasing area. It also features restaurants on the floors basement 1 to the 3rd floor, while having a landscaped area on the tower's outer areas and a rooftop sky garden. The tower is also installed with viscous damping walls, viscoelastic dampers, and unbonded braces in each floor. The tower is also directly connected to Roppongi-itchōme Station of the Tokyo Metro Namboku Line.

Its office tenants include Acyan, Asurion Holdings Japan, Cloud Native Community Japan, Warner Music Japan Inc., Nishiwaki Law Offices, Post Lintel Investment Management, Ripple Law Offices, Teleperformance Japan, and Xandr Japan.

=== Ark Hills Side ===
Located across the southern area of the main complex and the Ark Hills West Tower, and beside the Dōgenji Shrine and the Ichiganjizoson Shrine, the Ark Hills Side is a 5-storey mixed-use commercial building and has a total floor area of 838 m^{2} (9,020 sq ft) and is currently home to various retail shops and an art gallery.

=== Ark Hills Annex ===
The Ark Hills Annex is a 1-storey annex building located across the Ark Tower East. The building has 127 m^{2} (1,370 sq ft) of space and was once occupied by the SPROUT Café Sakurazaka until its closure in May 2023.

== Amenities ==
=== Ark Karajan Place ===
The Ark Karajan Place is a 750 m^{2} (8,100 sq ft) open plaza sandwiched between the Mori Building, the Suntory Hall, the TV Asahi Ark Broadcasting Center and the Ark Place West Tower. Named after the Austrian conductor Herbert von Karajan, the plaza features a retractable roof located atop of the plaza, allowing the plaza to be used for all seasons and for various events, such as the annual Ark Hills Music Week. The plaza is also connected to other pocket Ark Garden open-air garden areas around the complex.

== Gallery ==
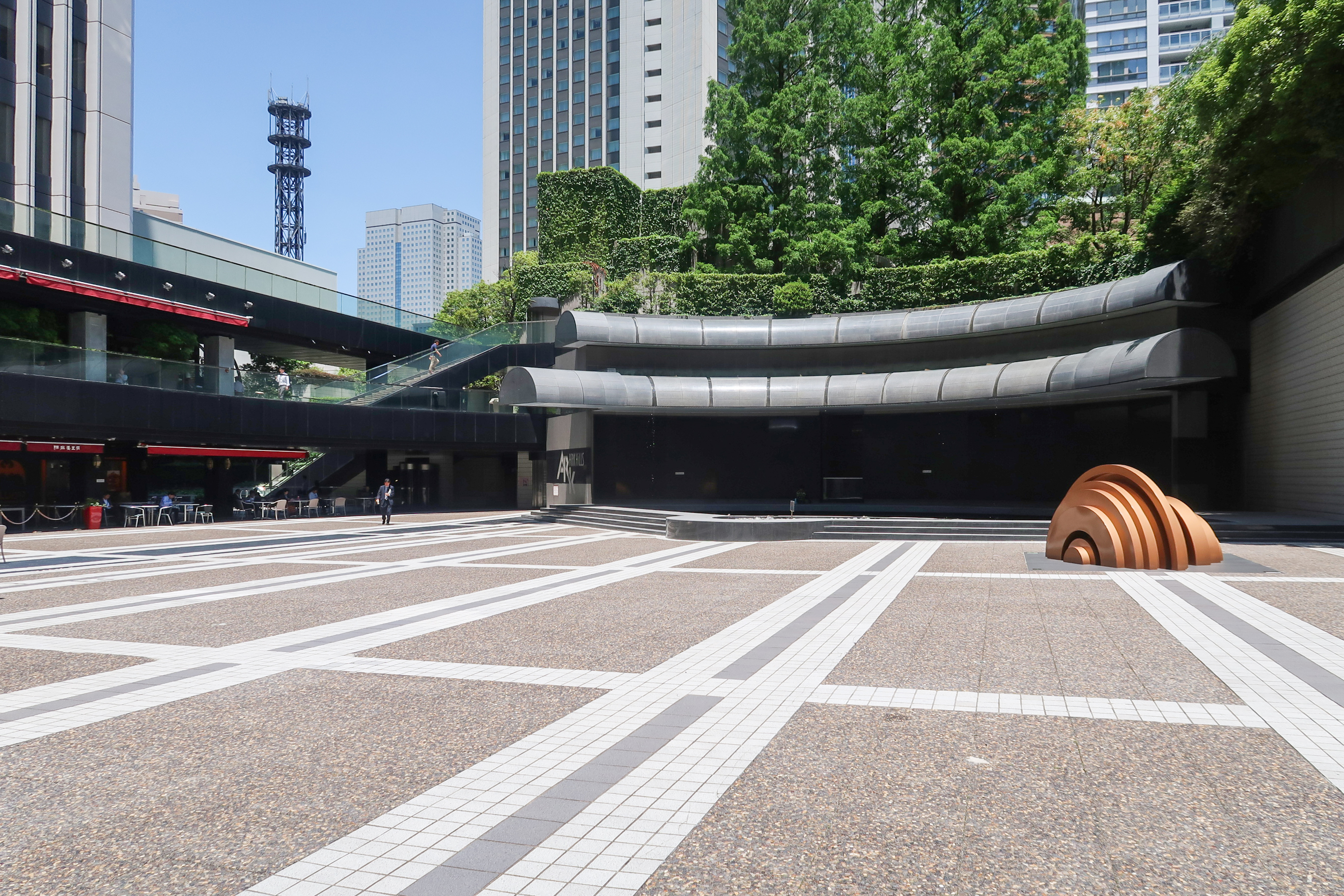
Waterfall

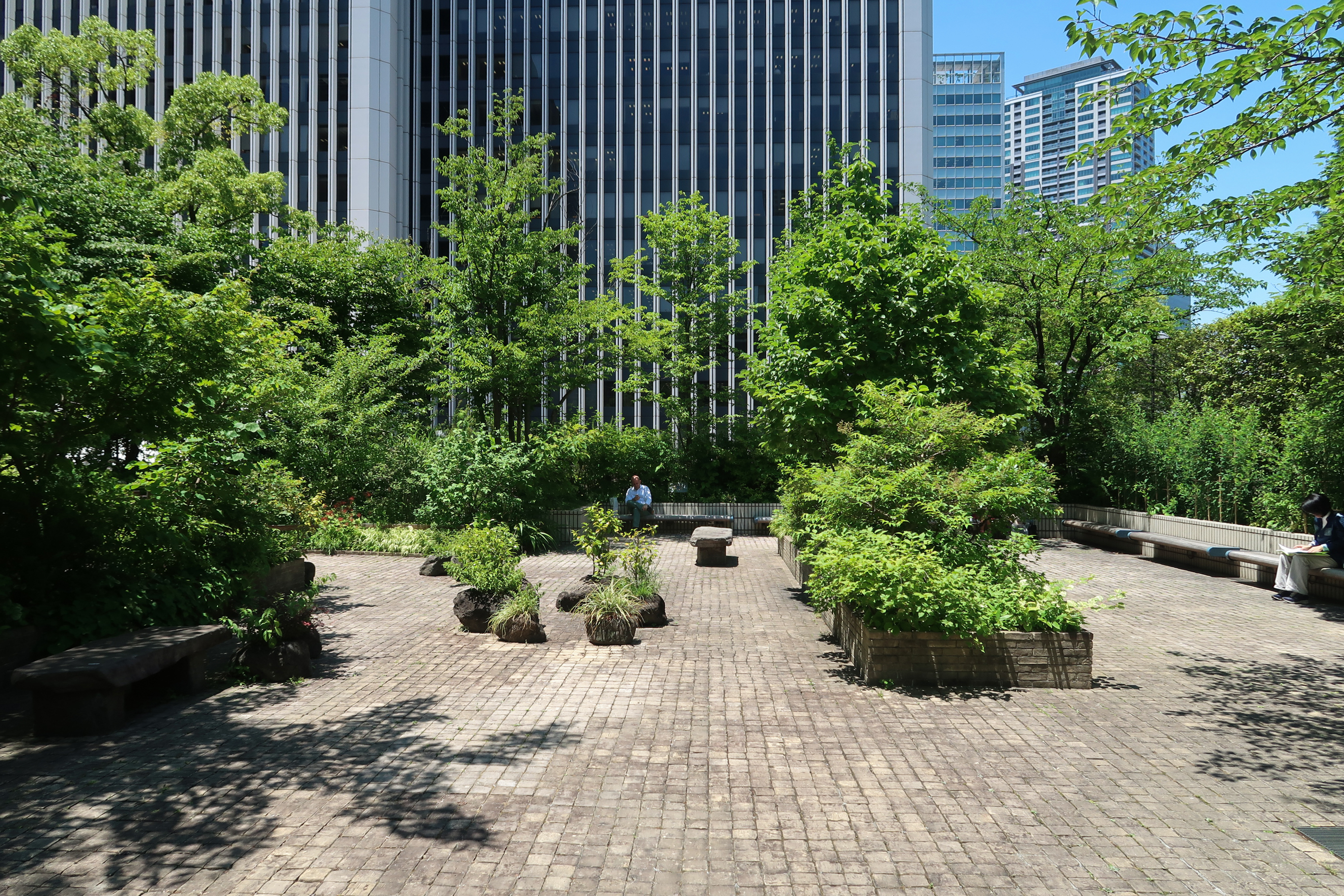
Ark Garden

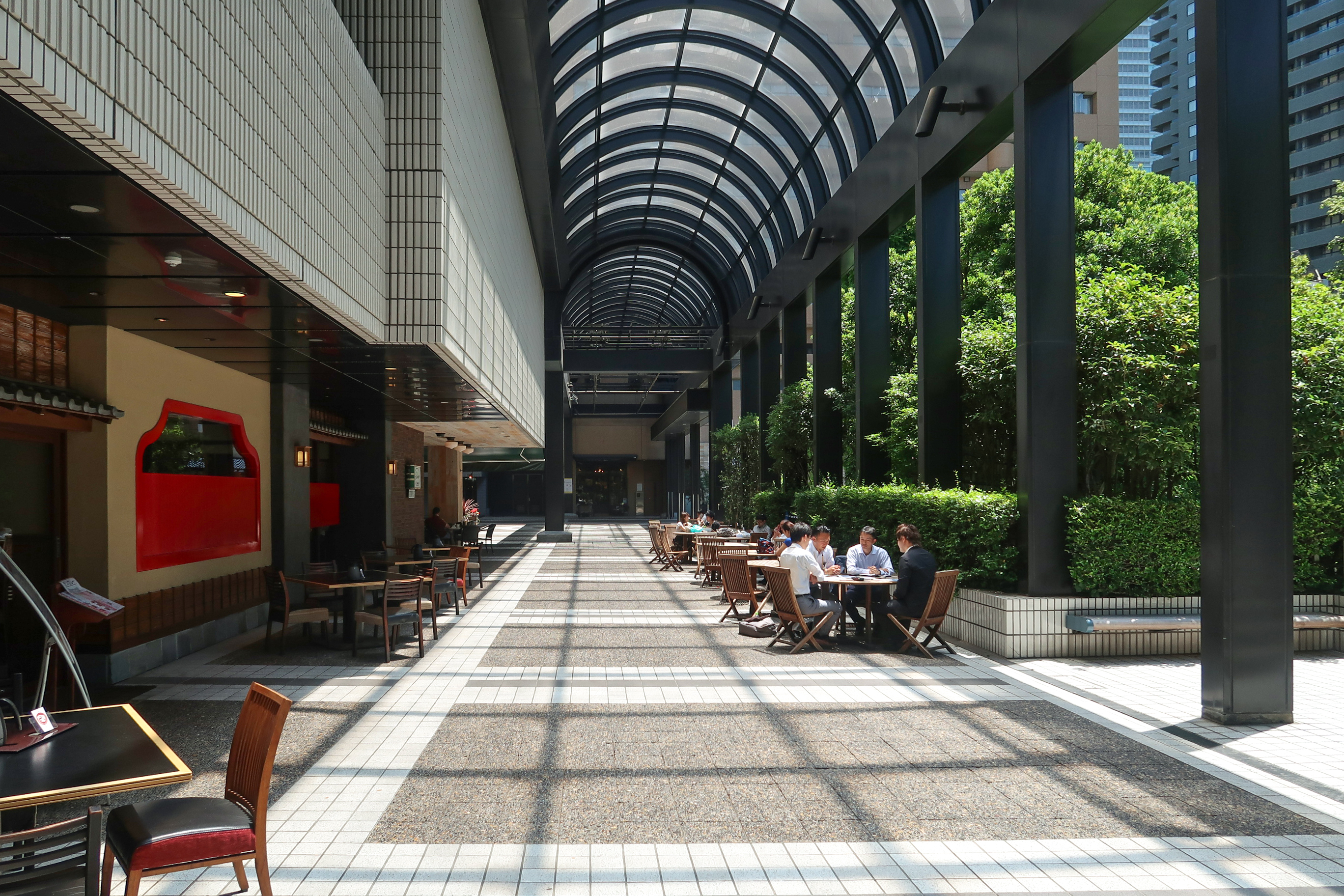
Building skylight

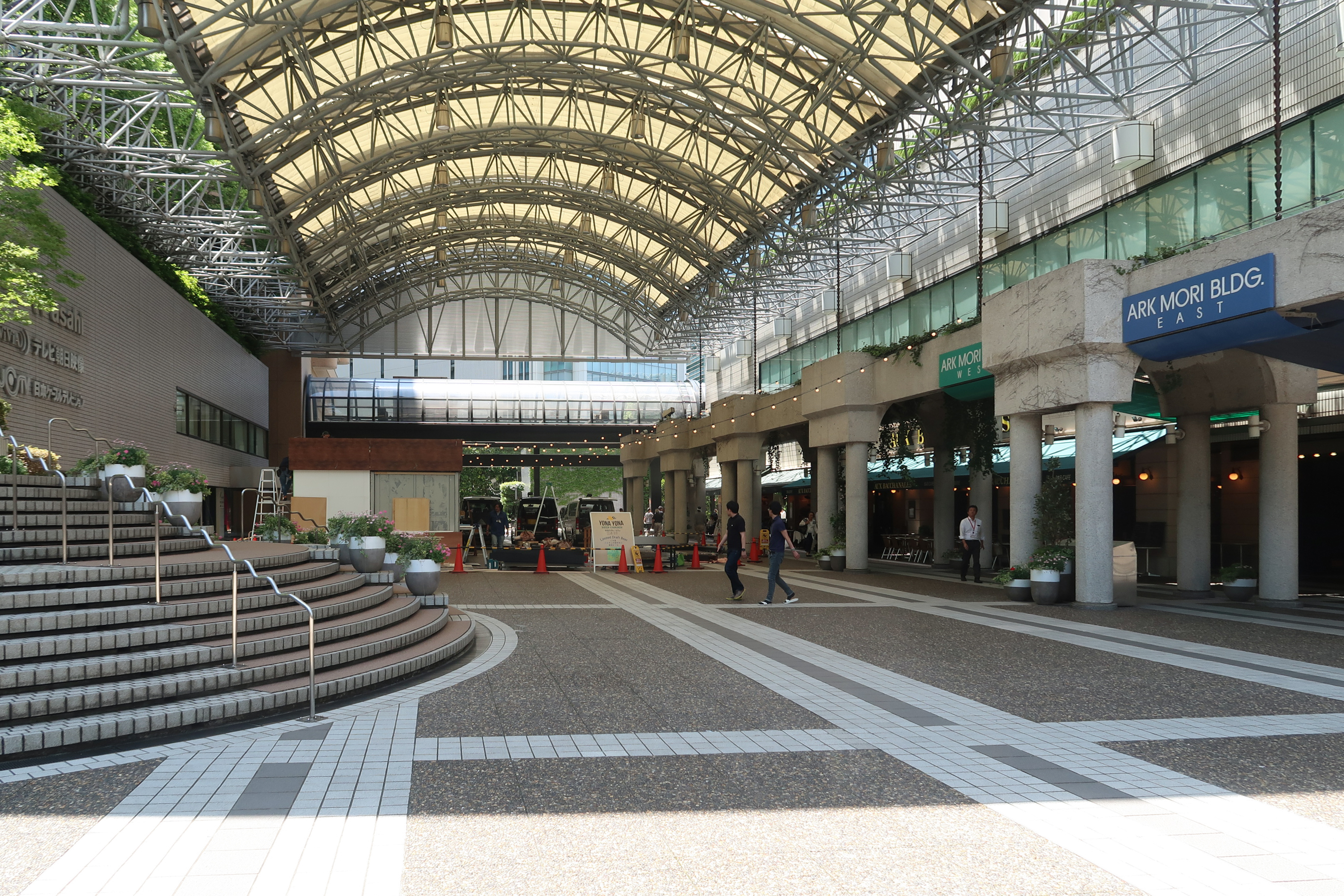
Covered plaza

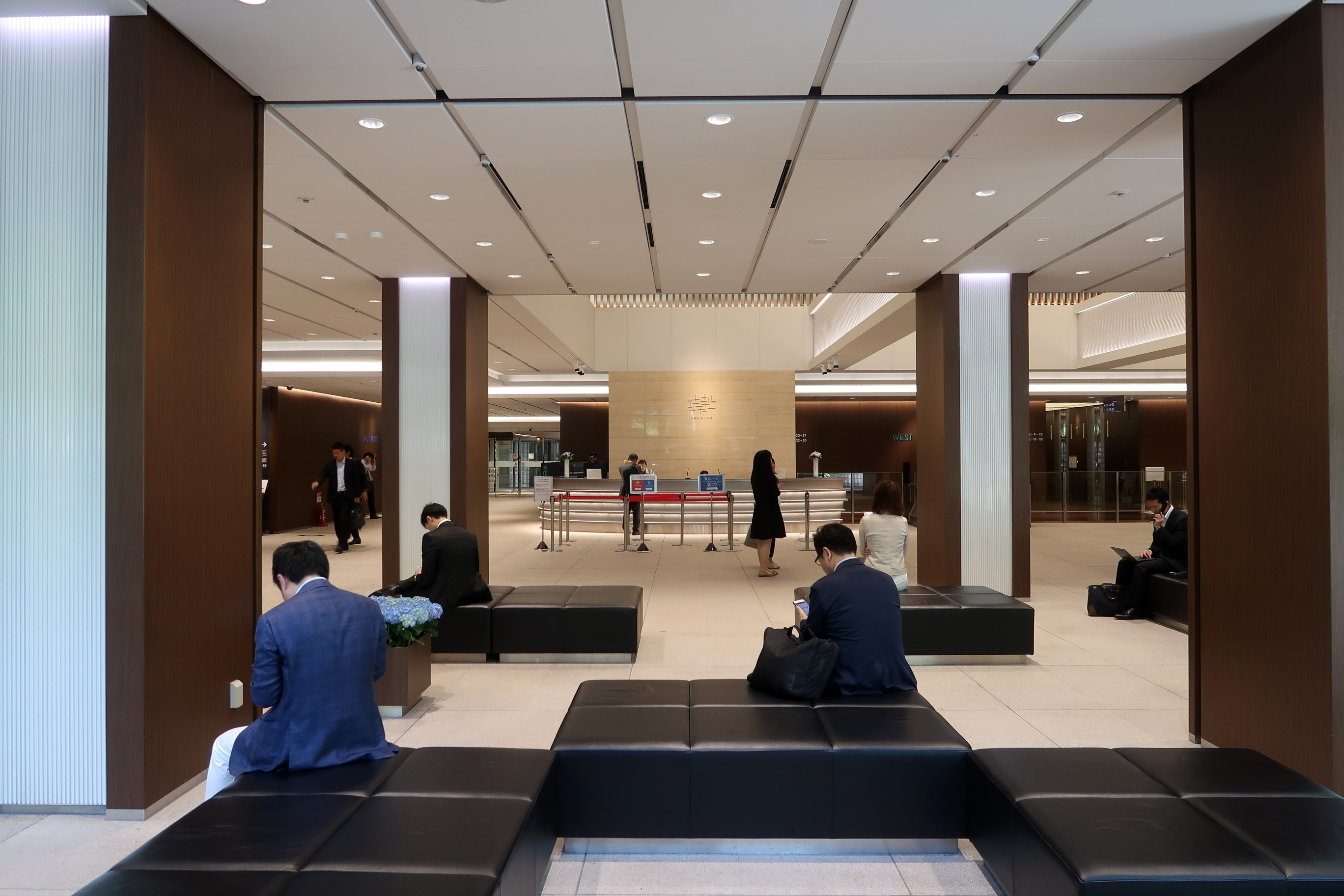
Ark Mori Building lobby

== See also ==
- Toranomon Hills
- Roppongi Hills
- Azabudai Hills
