= Ark Hills Sengokuyama Mori Tower =

Skyscraper in Tokyo, Japan

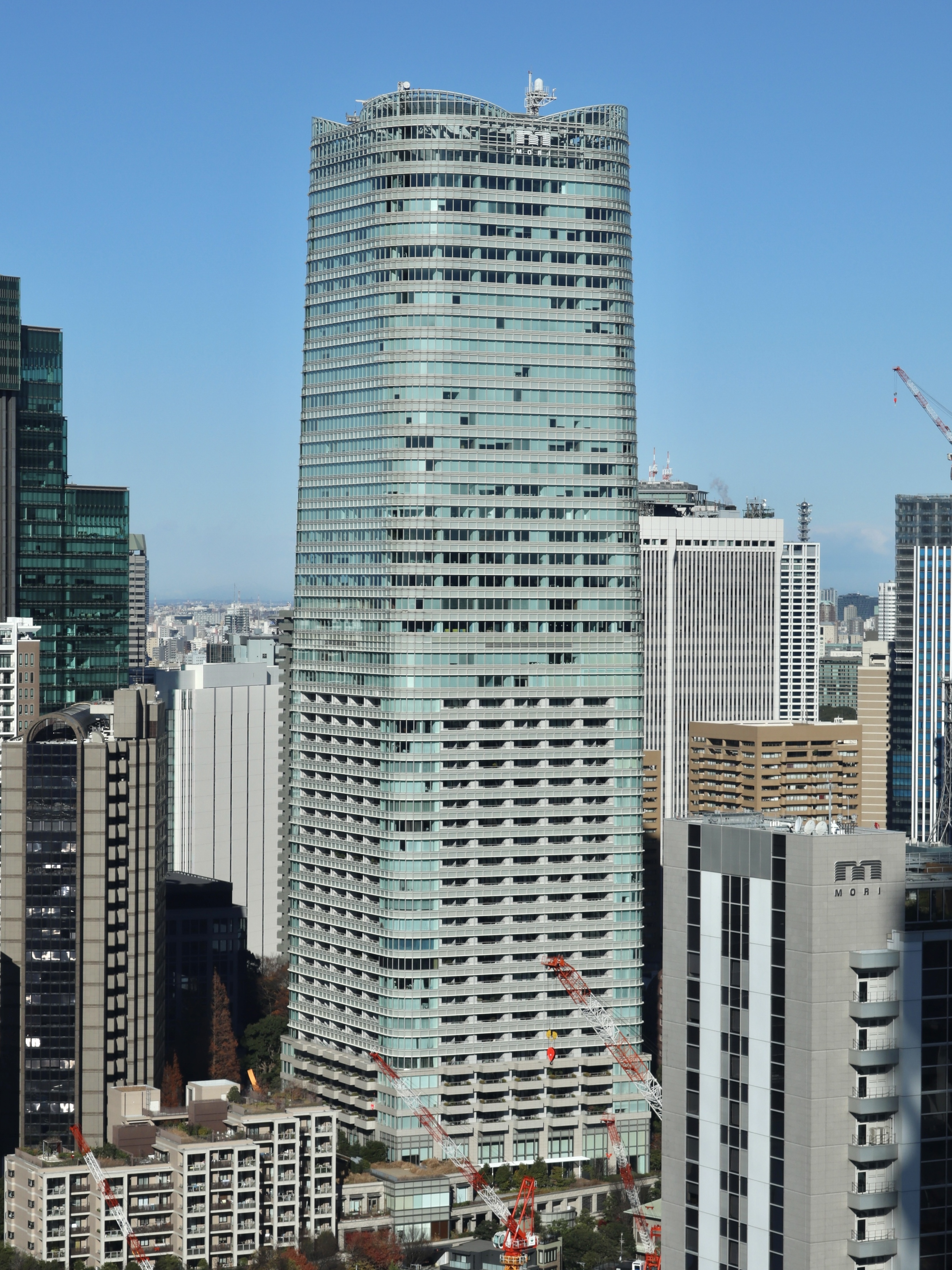

General information
- Status: Completed
- Type: Offices, shops, residences
- Architectural style: Modern
- Location: Roppongi, Tokyo, Japan
- Coordinates: 35.6635993°N 139.7417854°E
- Construction started: October 2009
- Completed: August 2012

Height
- Architectural: 206.7 m (678 ft)
- Tip: 217.1 m (712 ft)
- Top floor: 198.4 m (651 ft)
- Observatory: 198.4 m (651 ft)

Technical details
- Material: Composite
- Floor count: 51 (47 above ground, 4 underground)
- Floor area: 143,462 m^{2} (1,544,210 sq ft)
- Lifts/elevators: 23

Design and construction
- Architects: Irie Miyake Architects and Engineers; Pelli Clarke Pelli Architects
- Developer: Mori Building Company
- Main contractor: Obayashi Corporation

The Ark Hills Sengokuyama Mori Tower (アークヒルズ仙石山森タワー) is a 206.7 m (678 ft) mixed-use skyscraper in Roppongi, Minato ward, Tokyo. The building was designed by Irie Miyake Architects and Engineers and Pelli Clarke Pelli Architects; Mori Building Company was the developer, while the construction process was managed by Obayashi Corporation. Construction of the tower started in 2009 and was completed in 2012.

The building is situated on 2 hectares (4.9 acres) of land area in Ark Hills, near Kamiyachō Station on the Tokyo Metro Hibiya Line and Roppongi-itchōme Station on the Tokyo Metro Namboku Line. The tower is surrounded by gardens that were designed to replicate the natural wildlife in Tokyo.

== Design ==
=== Seismic design ===
The building was designed to withstand earthquakes and strong winds by using two different types of mass dampers. The first damper type is the viscous vibration damping walls (the "sticky wall") that was designed to sustain small- and medium-size earthquakes, (Note: The viscous vibration damping walls are damping devices in which high-viscosity fluid (highly sticky substance) is injected into the box-shaped steel plates that located along the core of the building so that they would create a resistance force by absorbing the floor shake gradually when the structure started to sway. It was previously implemented on Roppongi Hills.) while the second damper type is the brake damper that was designed to sustain major earthquakes. (Note: The brake (seismic friction) damper is a damping device that uses frictional energy of brake pads to absorb vibrations.)

=== Facade and primary uses ===
The primary functions of the building are distinguished by its facade. The retail and commercial uses of the building, which are located on floors 1–2, are represented by the glass and stone facade with the squared-shape building corners; the apartments, which are located on floors 3-24, are distinguished by its balconies with the rounded-shape building corners; while the offices, which are located on floors 25–47, are covered by the glass with the building corners are subtly stepped back, forming the cone-like shape on the upper parts of the building.

== See also ==
- List of tallest structures in Japan
- List of tallest structures in Tokyo
