= Roppongi-itchōme Station =

Metro station in Tokyo, Japan

Roppongi-itchome Station 六本木一丁目駅

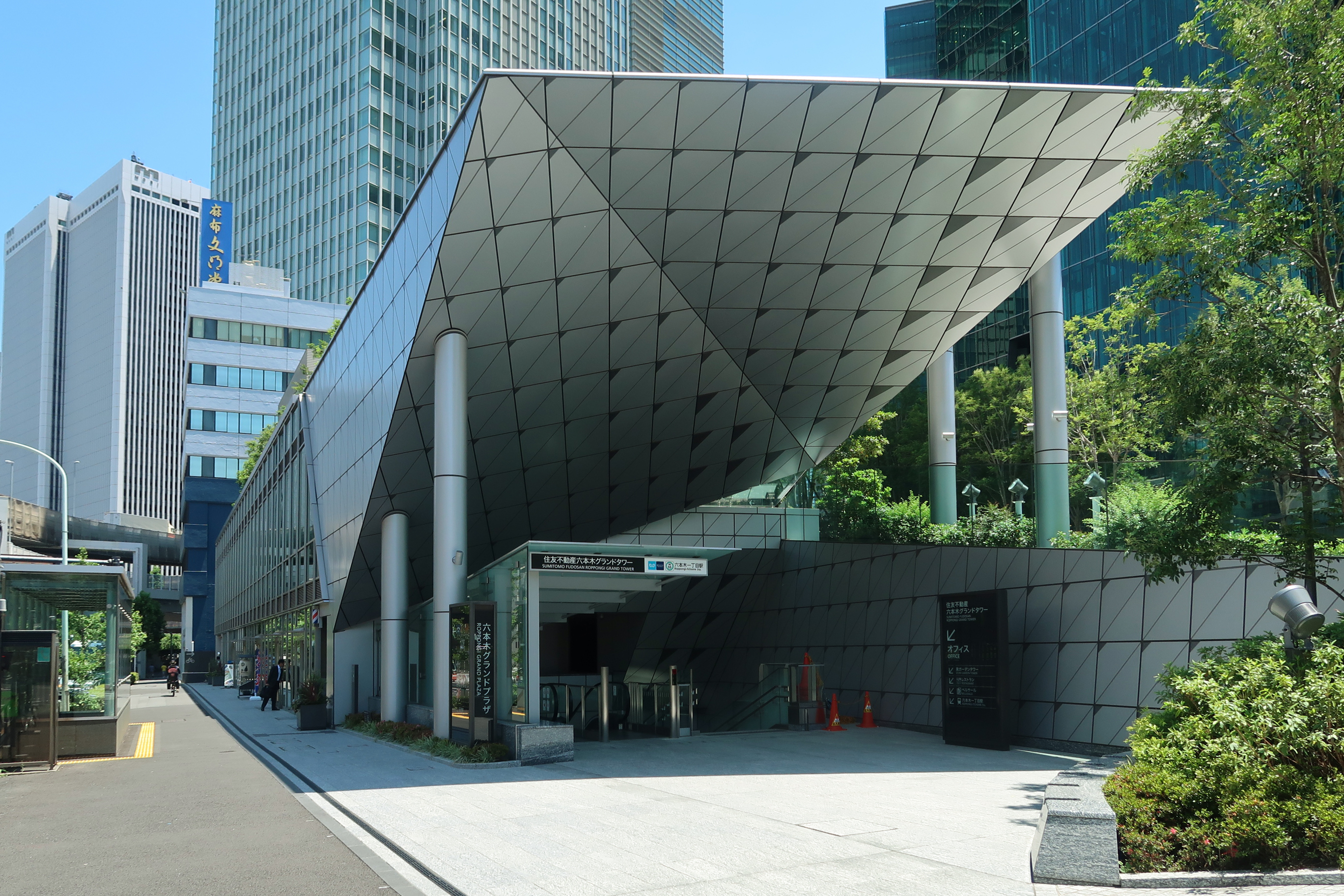
- Exit in May 2018

General information
- Location: 1-4-1 Roppongi, Minato-ku, Tokyo; Japan
- Coordinates: 35.664902°N 139.738884°E
- Operator: Tokyo Metro
- Line: Namboku Line
- Platforms: 1 island platform
- Tracks: 2
- Connections: Bus stop

Construction
- Structure type: Underground

Other information
- Station code: N-05
- Website: Official website

History
- Opened: 26 September 2000; 25 years ago

Passengers
- FY2019: 88,958 daily

Services
Preceding station	Tokyo Metro	Following station
Azabu-juban towards Meguro	Namboku Line	Tameike-sannō towards Akabane-iwabuchi
Location
- Location within Tokyo Yamanote Loop Location within Tokyo wards area Location within Japan

Roppongi-itchome Station (六本木一丁目駅, Roppongi-itchōme-eki) is a subway station on the Namboku Line in Roppongi, Minato, Tokyo, Japan, operated by the Tokyo subway operator Tokyo Metro.

== Lines ==
Roppongi-itchome Station is served by the Namboku Line, and is numbered "N-05". It is 4.8 km from the southern terminus of the line at Meguro. Through services operate to and from Urawa-Misono on the Saitama Rapid Railway Line to the north and Hiyoshi on the Meguro Line to the south. It is also relatively close to Roppongi Station on the Tokyo Metro Hibiya Line and Toei Ōedo Line (located 800 meters to the southwest), although it is not officially recognized as a transfer station and there is no transfer corridor between the two stations.

== Station layout ==
The station concourse and ticket machines are located on the second basement ("B2F") level. The station has one island platform located on the 4th basement ("B4F") level, serving two tracks. It also has 3 exits that lead to different places.

=== Platforms ===
1
Namboku Line
for Iidabashi, Komagome, and Akabane-iwabuchi
Saitama Rapid Railway Line for Urawa-misono
2
- for Shirokane-takanawa and Meguro
- Meguro Line for Hiyoshi
- Tokyu Shin-Yokohama Line for Shin-Yokohama Station
- Sotetsu Main Line for Ebina via the Tokyu/Sotetsu Shin-Yokohama Line

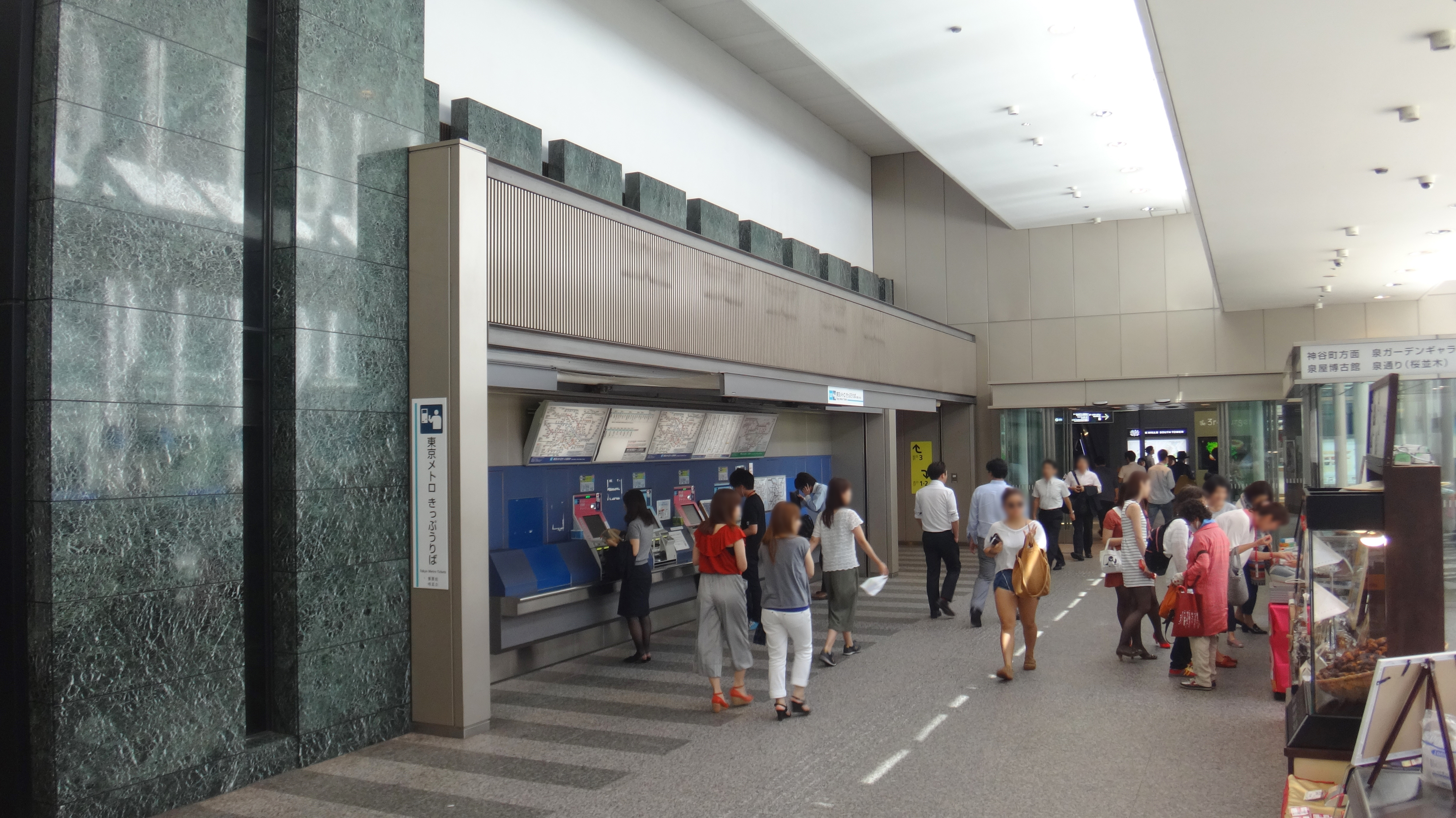
The ticket machines on the second basement level in July 2015

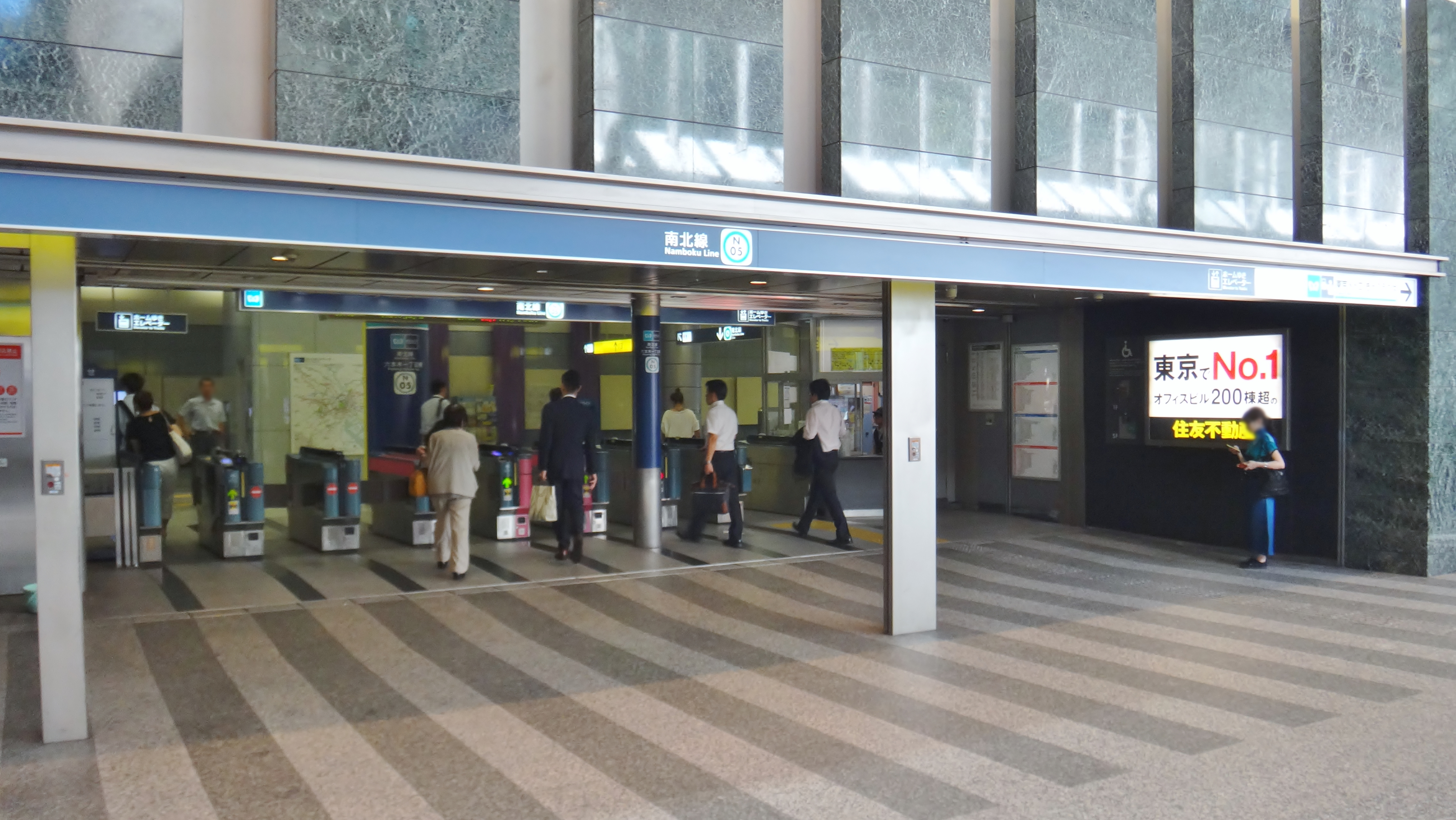
The ticket barriers on the second basement level in July 2015

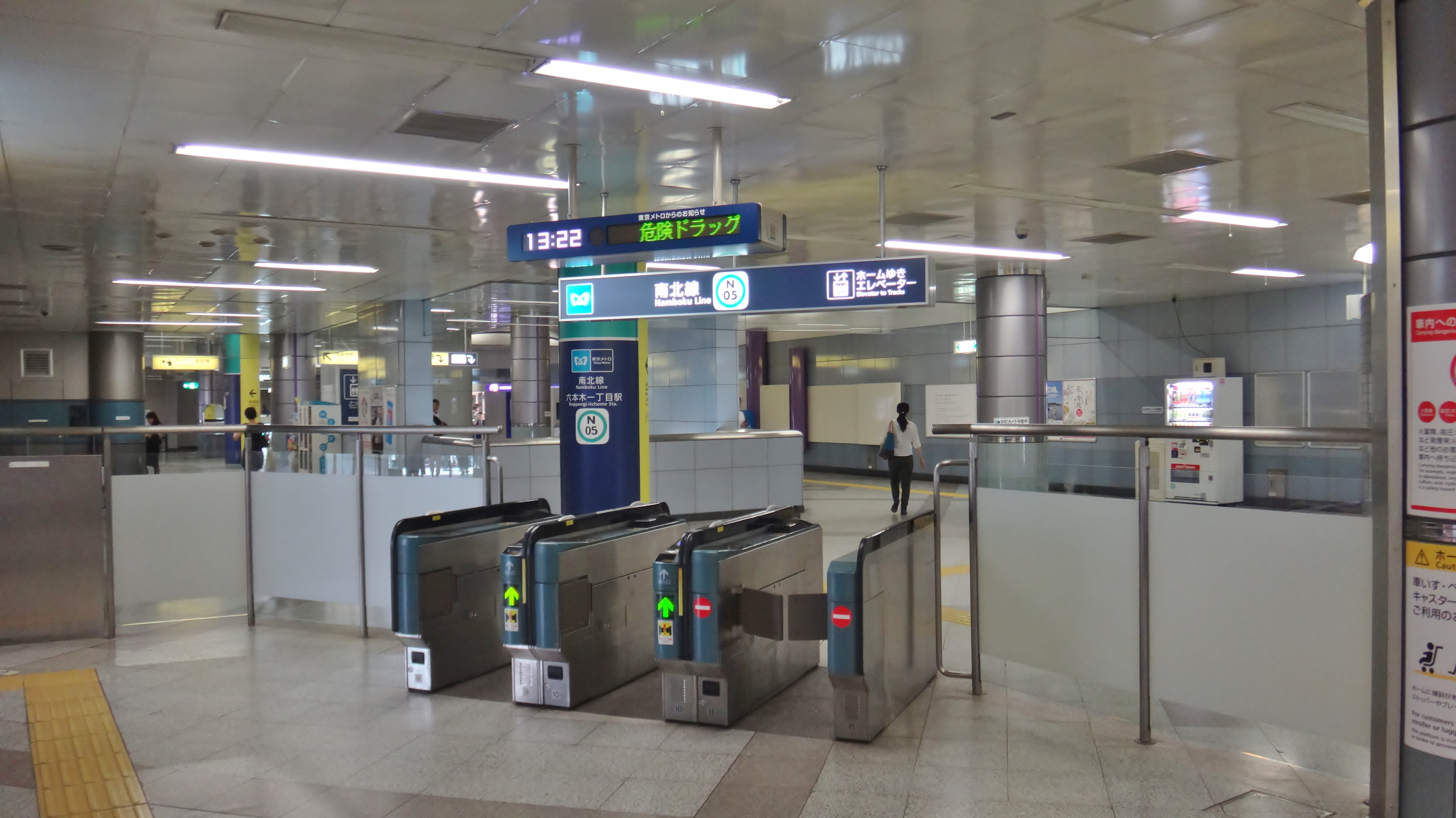
The ticket barriers on the second basement level in July 2015

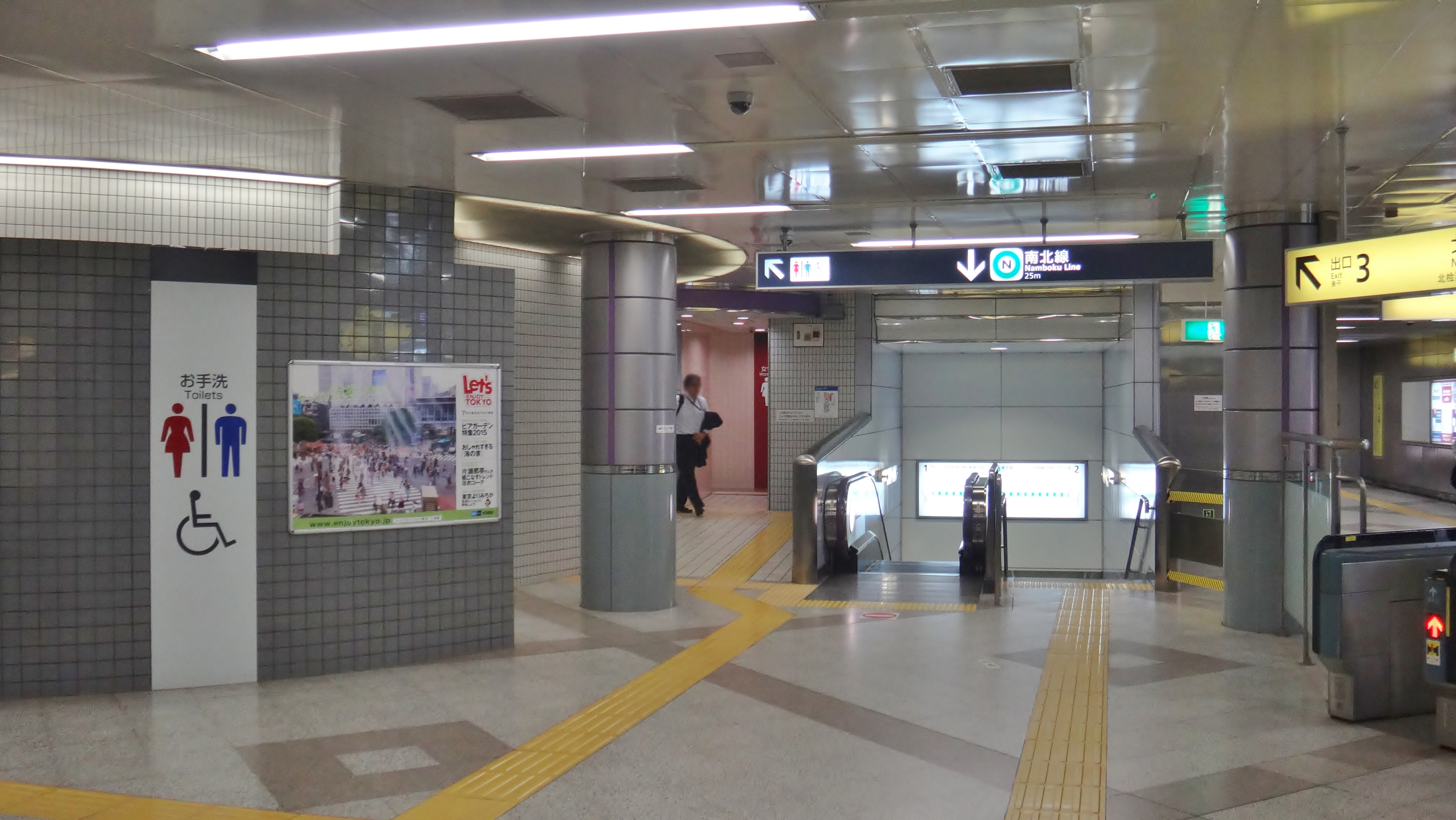
The station toilets on the second basement level in July 2015

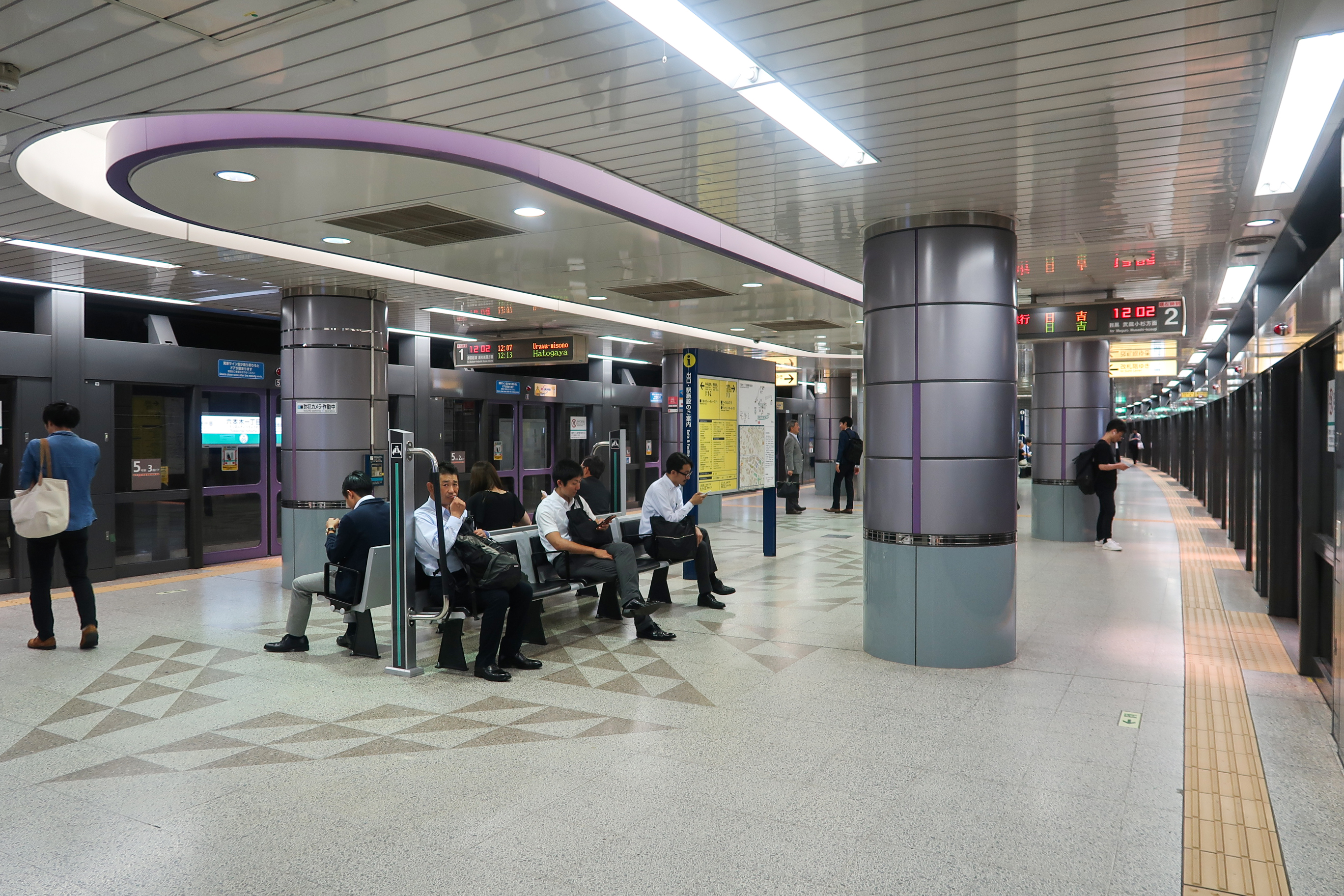
The platforms in June 2018

== History ==
Roppongi-itchome Station opened on 26 September 2000 on the Namboku line. Prior to its opening, the station's provisional name was Higashi-Roppongi Station ("East Roppongi").

The station facilities were inherited by Tokyo Metro after the privatization of the Teito Rapid Transit Authority (TRTA) in 2004.

== Passenger statistics ==
In 2019, the station was used by an average of 88,958 passengers daily.

== Surrounding area ==
The main station exit is connected directly to basement levels of the Izumi Garden Tower building.

- Ark Hills
- Suntory Hall
- Izumi Garden Tower
- Sumitomo Fudosan Roppongi Grand Tower
- TV Asahi studios
- TV Tokyo studios

=== Embassies ===
- The Embassy of the Federated States of Micronesia
- The Embassy of Spain
- The Embassy of Saudi Arabia
- The Embassy of Sweden
- The Embassy of the United States
- The Embassy of Syria

=== Schools ===
- Azabu Elementary School

=== Hotels ===
- ANA Intercontinental Tokyo
- Hotel Okura Tokyo
- Hotel Villa Fontaine Tokyo
- Roppongi Prince Hotel

== See also ==
- List of railway stations in Japan
