= Atago Green Hills =

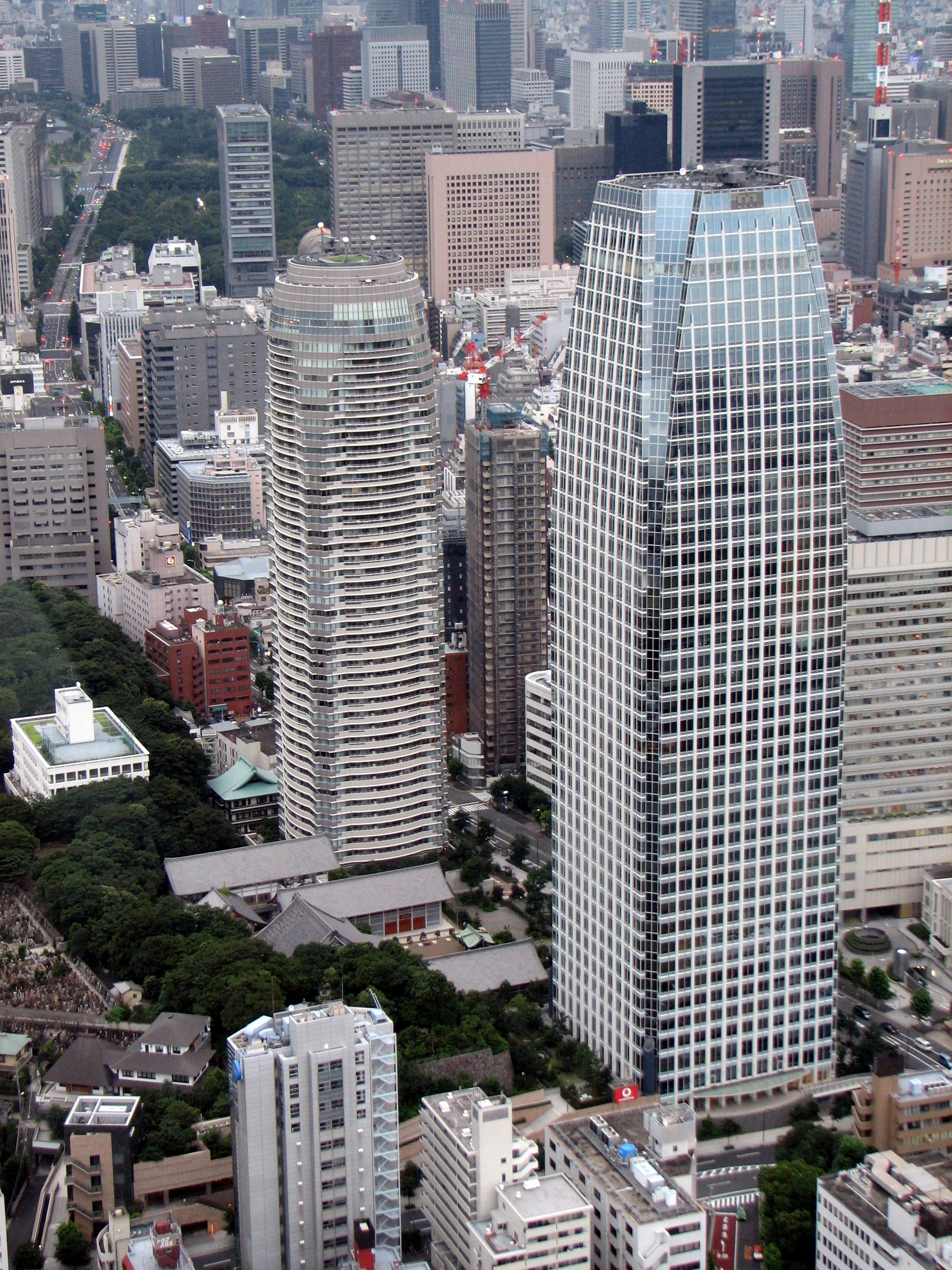
- Forest Tower (left) and MORI Tower (right) viewed from Tokyo Tower.
- Interactive map of the Atago Green Hills area

General information
- Status: Completed
- Type: Office
- Location: Minato, Tokyo, Japan
- Coordinates: 35°39′44″N 139°44′56″E
- Completed: 2001
- Owner: Mori Building

Design and construction
- Architect: Cesar Pelli

Atago Green Hills (愛宕グリーンヒルズ, Atago Gurīn Hiruzu) is an urban complex, located in Atago, Minato-ku in central Tokyo between the Kamiyacho and Onarimon subway stations. Constructed by building tycoon Minoru Mori, the complex incorporates offices, residences, shops, gardens, temples and a museum.

== The development ==
Atago Green Hills is a large-scale redevelopment project built on a 3.8-acre (15,000 m^{2}) site. It was planned with the development philosophy of preserving the culture, topography and greenery of the Mt Atago area while making use of this important inner city landscape resource. Atago Green Hills is also an urban complex embodying Mori Building's concept of bringing home and workplace closer together and the development is dominated by a pair of towers - one residential (Forest Tower) and one office (MORI Tower). The Mori Tower with 42 above ground and 2 below ground was completed in July 2001, and the Forest Tower with 42 above ground 4 below ground was completed in October 2001. The development was eclipsed by Roppongi Hills which opened in 2003.

=== MORI Tower ===
The MORI Tower is 187 m, 42-story high-rise building designed by Cesar Pelli. It houses the offices of foreign banks such as ABN Amro, Commerzbank, Rabobank and EuroHypo, and domestic companies such as Sumitomo Mitsui Asset Management and SoftBank Mobile (formerly Vodafone Japan). The first four levels contain retail space and a clinic. The top floor houses two restaurants with panoramic views of the city.

=== Forest Tower ===
The Forest Tower houses 354 residence units, both furnished serviced apartments for short-term stay as well as long-term rental units. Residents have access to a spa with gym and swimming pool located on the top floor. There is a clinic operated by the nearby Jikei University School of Medicine Hospital on the premises and residents also have access to an open-air viewing platform on the roof.

=== Temples ===
The site houses the Seishoji, Seigan-in and Denso-in Temples.
