= Komainu =

Statues mainly found in Shinto shrines

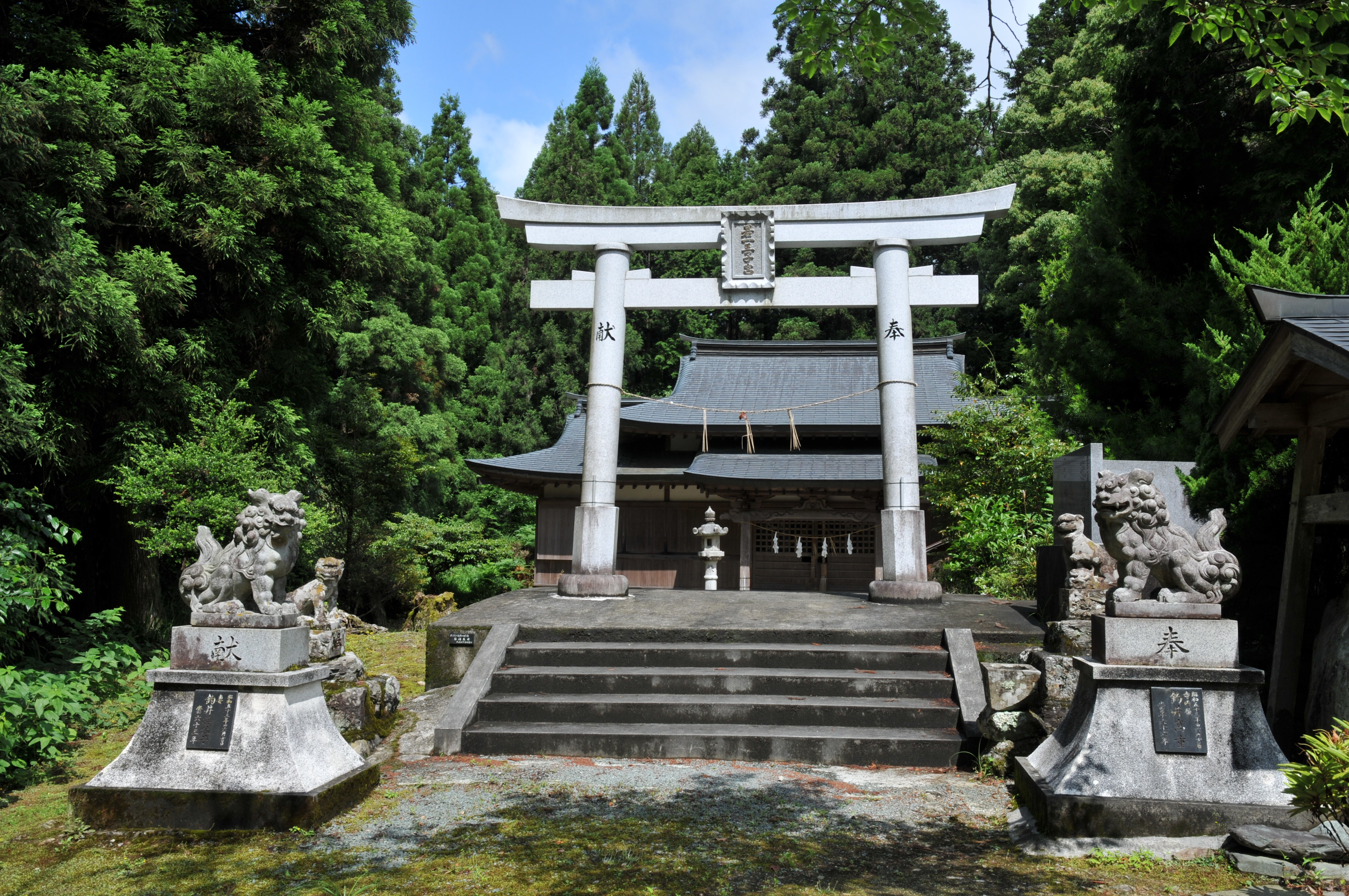
A pair of komainu, the "a" on the right, the "un" on the left

Komainu (狛犬), often called lion-dogs in English, are statue pairs of lion-like creatures, which traditionally guard the entrance or gate of the shrine, or placed in front of or within the honden (inner sanctum) of Japanese Shinto shrines.

== Symbolic meaning ==
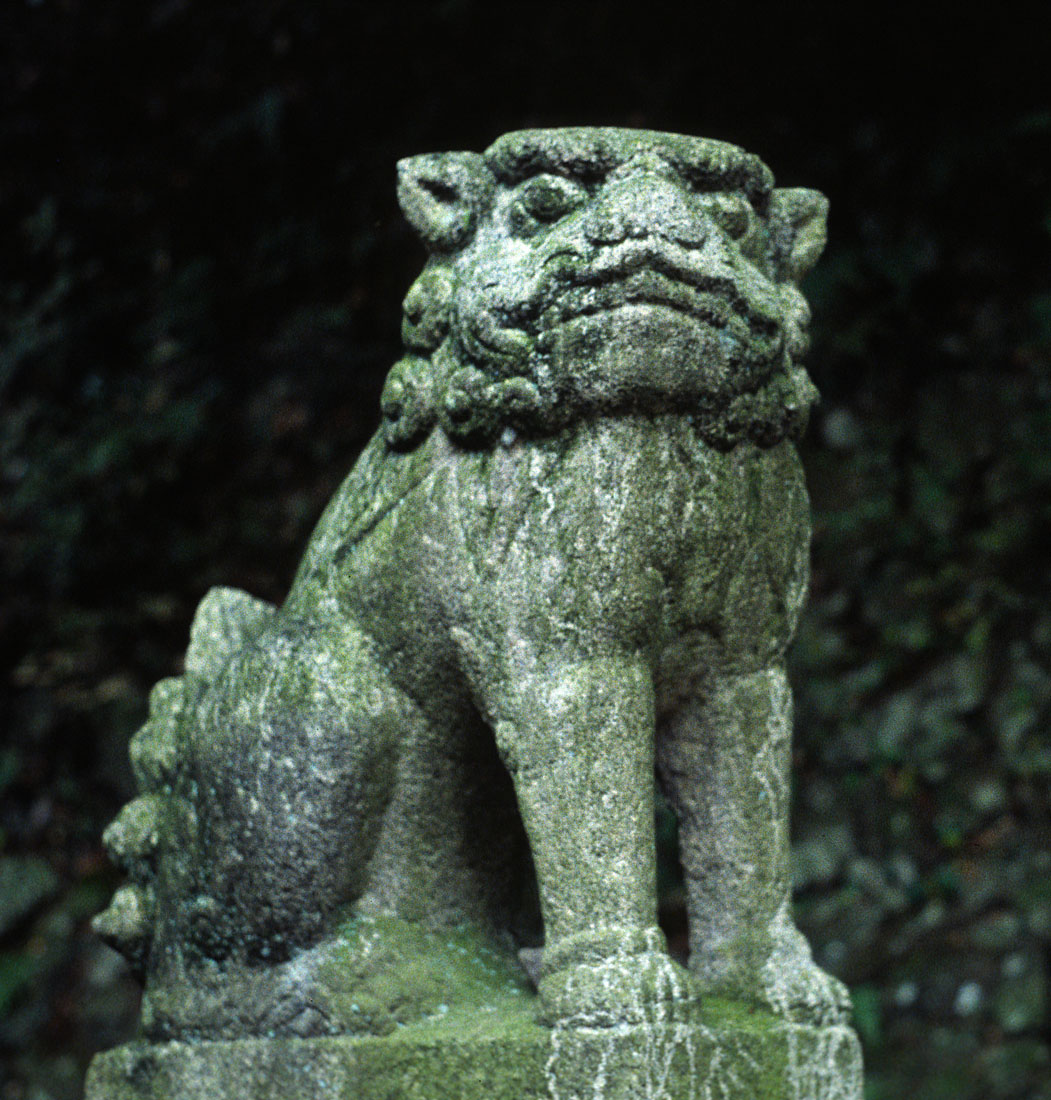
An un-gyō komainu

A pair of komainu (construable as "Korean dog") or shishi ("lion")/karajishi ("Chinese lion") are the typical stone-made creatures associated with gatekeeping on Shinto shrine grounds.

Meant to ward off evil spirits, modern komainu statues are usually near identical except for the shapes of their mouths: one has it open, the other closed (however, exceptions exist, where both komainu have their mouth either open or closed). The two forms are called a-gyō (阿形; lit. '"a" shape') for the open mouthed statue, symbolically representing the beginning of all things, and un-gyō (吽形; lit. '"un" shape') for the closed mouth statue, symbolically representing the end of all things. Collectively they are known as a-un and together, they symbolically represent the beginning and the end of all things. The iconography and symbolism were imported, and not native to Shintoism. The a-un symbolism is the same symbolism as that which is associated with the Niō, the two Buddhist gatekeeper deities. (Note: This is a very common characteristic in religious statue pairs at both temples and shrines. The pattern is Buddhist in origin (see the article about the Niō, human-form guardians of Buddhist temples) and has a symbolic meaning: The open mouth is pronouncing the first letter of the Sanskrit alphabet, which is pronounced "a", while the closed one is uttering the last letter, which is pronounced "um", to represent the beginning and the end of all things. Together they form the sound Aum, a syllable sacred in several religions like Hinduism, Buddhism, and Jainism.)

== History ==
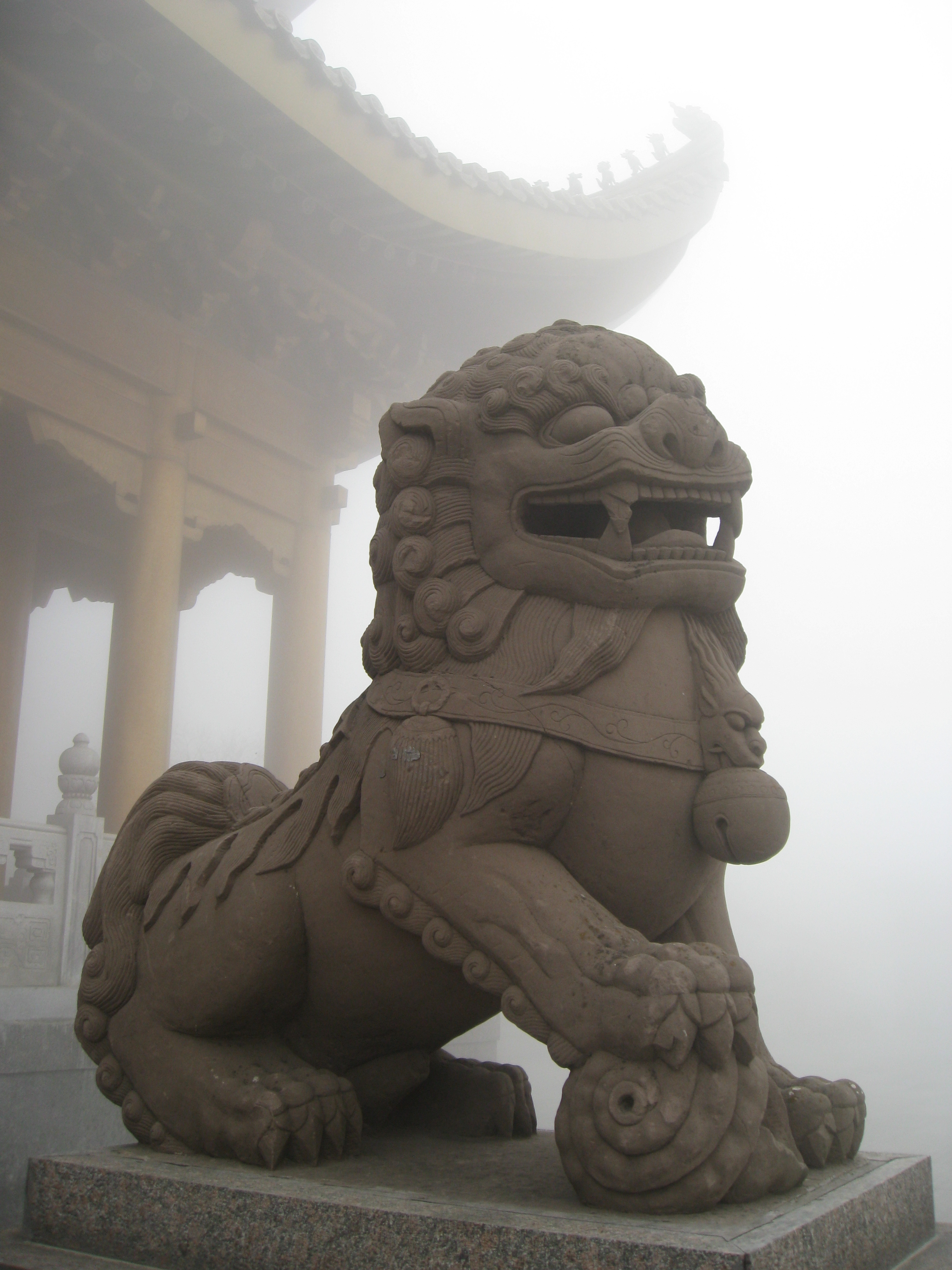
A statue of a guardian lion looking over Mount Emei, China

=== Origins ===
In Asia, the lion was popularly believed to have the power to repel evil, and for this reason it was habitually used to guard gates and doors. The Komainu strongly resemble Chinese guardian lions and in fact originate from Tang dynasty China. The Chinese guardian lions are believed to have been influenced by Asiatic lion pelts and lion depictions introduced through trade from either the Middle East or India, countries where the lion existed and was a symbol of strength. During its transportation along the Silk Road, however, the symbol changed, acquiring a distinctive look. The first lion statue in India appears around the 3rd century BC on top of a column erected by King Ashoka. The tradition later arrived in China where it developed into the guardian lion that was later exported to Korea, Japan, and Okinawa. A further style was introduced to Japan from Song dynasty China during the Kamakura period, and is often referred to as kara jishi ("Chinese lion"). During the Nara period (710–794), as in the rest of Asia, the pair always consisted of two lions. Used only indoors until the 14th century, they were made mainly of wood. During the Heian period (794–1185), for example, wooden or metal pairs were employed as weights and door-stops, while at the Imperial Palace they were used to support screens or folding screens.

=== Heian period ===
The custom of placing wooden, and later stone representations of the kara-inu and lions were established no later than the mid-Heian period (tenth century), though precise dating remains uncertain.

Perhaps as early as the earlier part of the Heian period (ninth century), the tradition changed and the two statues started to be different and be called differently. One had its mouth open and was called shishi (獅子; lit. 'lion') because, as before, it resembled that animal. The other had its mouth closed, looked rather like a dog, was called komainu, or "Goguryeo dog", and sometimes had a single horn on its head. Gradually the animals returned to be identical, but for their mouths, and ended up being called both komainu.

Eventually they also became apotropaic objects protecting Buddhist temples, royal palaces, nobility residences or even private homes. A pair of these dogs are painted on the front walls of the honden (inner sanctuary) at the Kamo-wakeikazuchi Shrine, but such painted examples are rare, possibly unique.

According to one reckoning, the komainu have been used outdoors only since the 14th century. In Japan, too, it ended up being installed at the entrance of shrines and temples next to the lion-dog. As a protection against exposure to Japan's rainy weather, the komainu started being carved in stone.

Komanezumi at Ōtoyo Jinja

=== Edo period ===
Starting in the Edo period the komainu began to be placed at the sandō (tr. "avenues of approach" to the shrine) and are now categorized as sandō komainu (参道狛犬; lit. 'entrance-road Komainu'). The much older type are called jinnai komainu (陣内狛犬; lit. 'komainu within [the shrine]'s premises'). They can sometimes be found also at Buddhist temples, nobility residences or even private homes.

Starting from the Edo period (1603–1868) other animals have been used instead of lions or dogs, among others wild boars, tigers, rats, dragons and foxes.

== Parallels ==
=== Foxes at Inari shrines ===
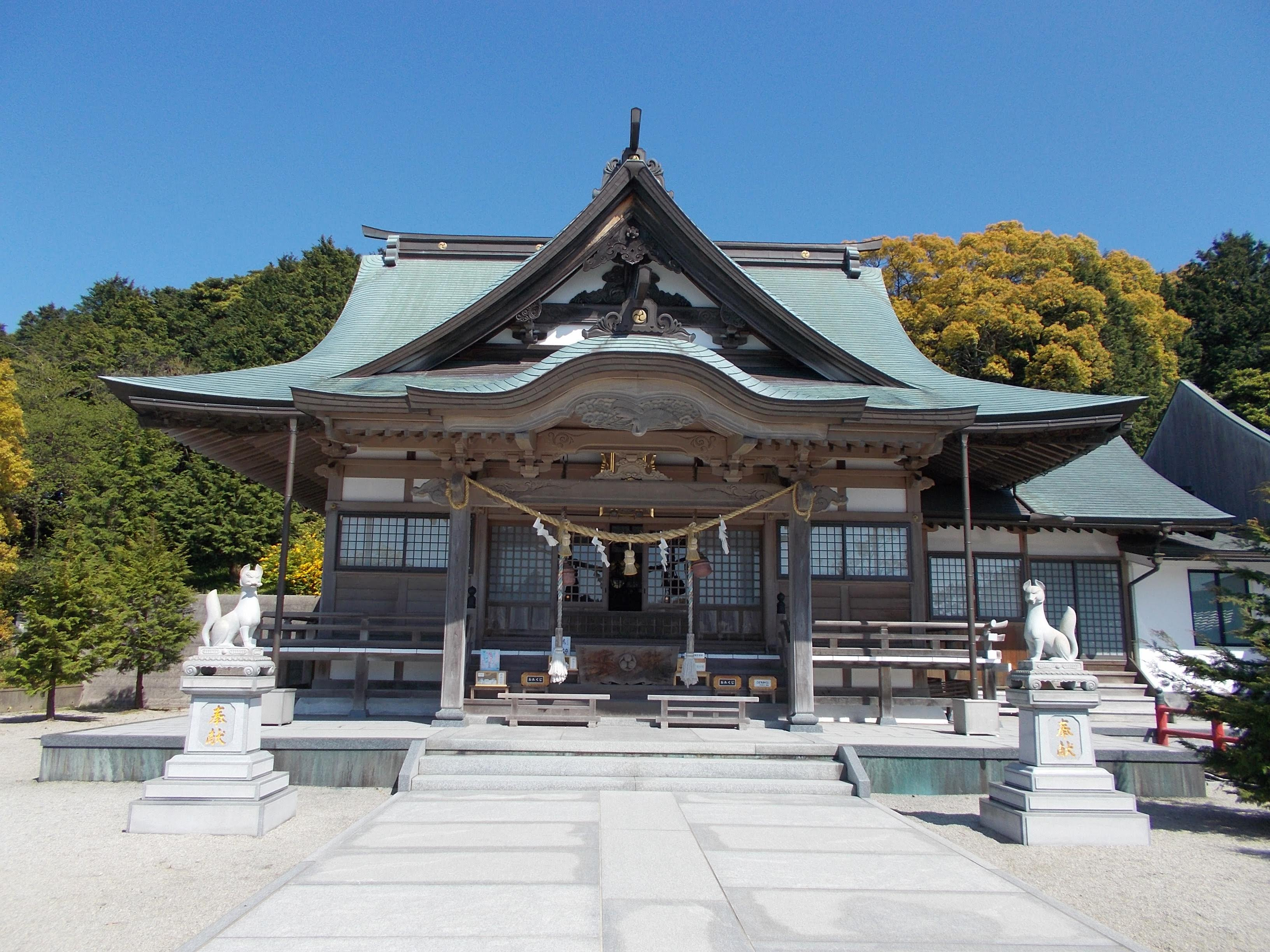
A pair of foxes at an Inari shrine

A variant of the komainu theme is the fox, acting as guardian of shrines dedicated to the Inari deity. There are about 30 thousand Inari shrines in Japan, and the entrance of each is guarded by a pair of fox statues. Often one, and sometimes both, has a sūtra roll, a key or a jewel in its mouth (sūtras are Buddhist texts, a fact which attests to the Buddhist origins of the Inari cult). The statues do not symbolize the animals' proverbial malice, but the magic powers they are believed to possess. Sometimes the guardians are painted, and in that case they are always white. White foxes are messengers of the kami, who is sometimes himself believed to be, and portrayed as, a fox. Although visible genitals are rare, the left fox is believed to be male, the right one female.

Often the foxes wear red votive bibs similar to those worn by statues of other figures: for example, the Buddhist bodhisattva figure Jizō. In this case, however, the bibs seem to be purely a rite, whose origins are unclear.

=== Okinawan shīsā ===
The shīsā (シーサー), the stone animals that in Okinawa guard the gates or the roofs of houses, are close relatives of the shishi and the komainu, objects whose origin, function and symbolic meaning they share. Their name itself is centuries old regional variant of shishi-san (獅子さん; lit. 'Mr. Lion').

== Gallery ==
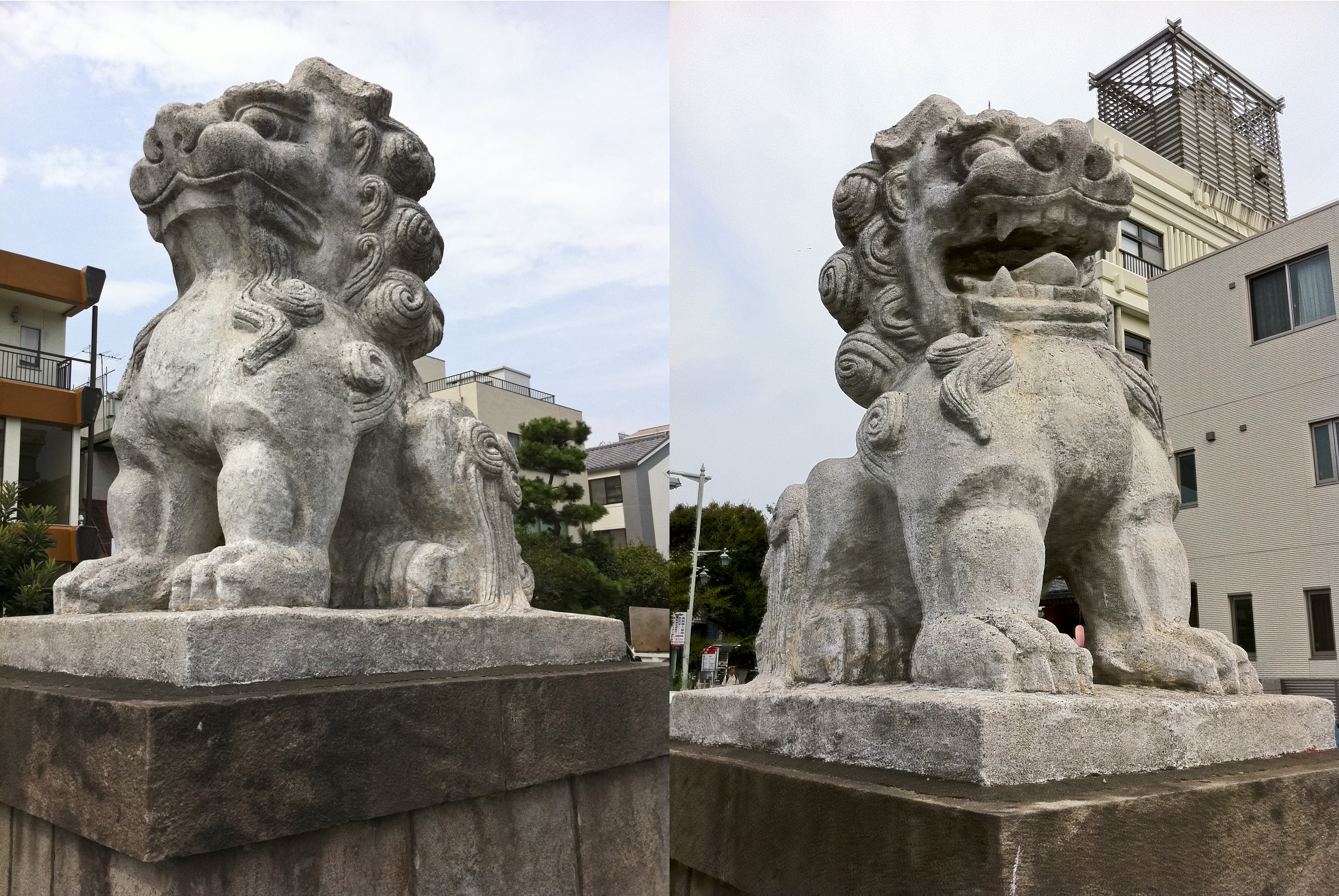
A-un pair of komainu; "a" on the right, "un" on the left

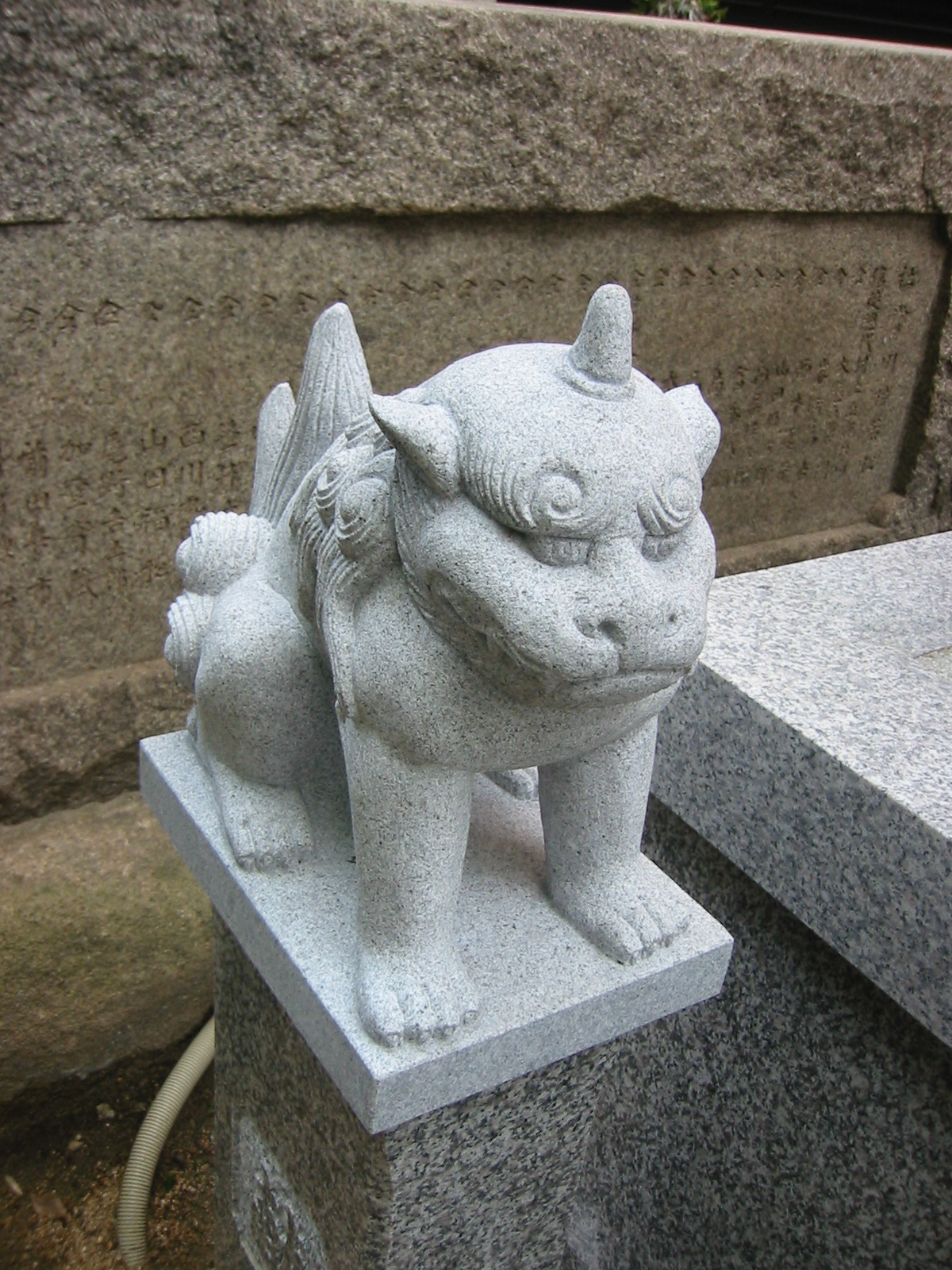
A komainu with a horn on its head

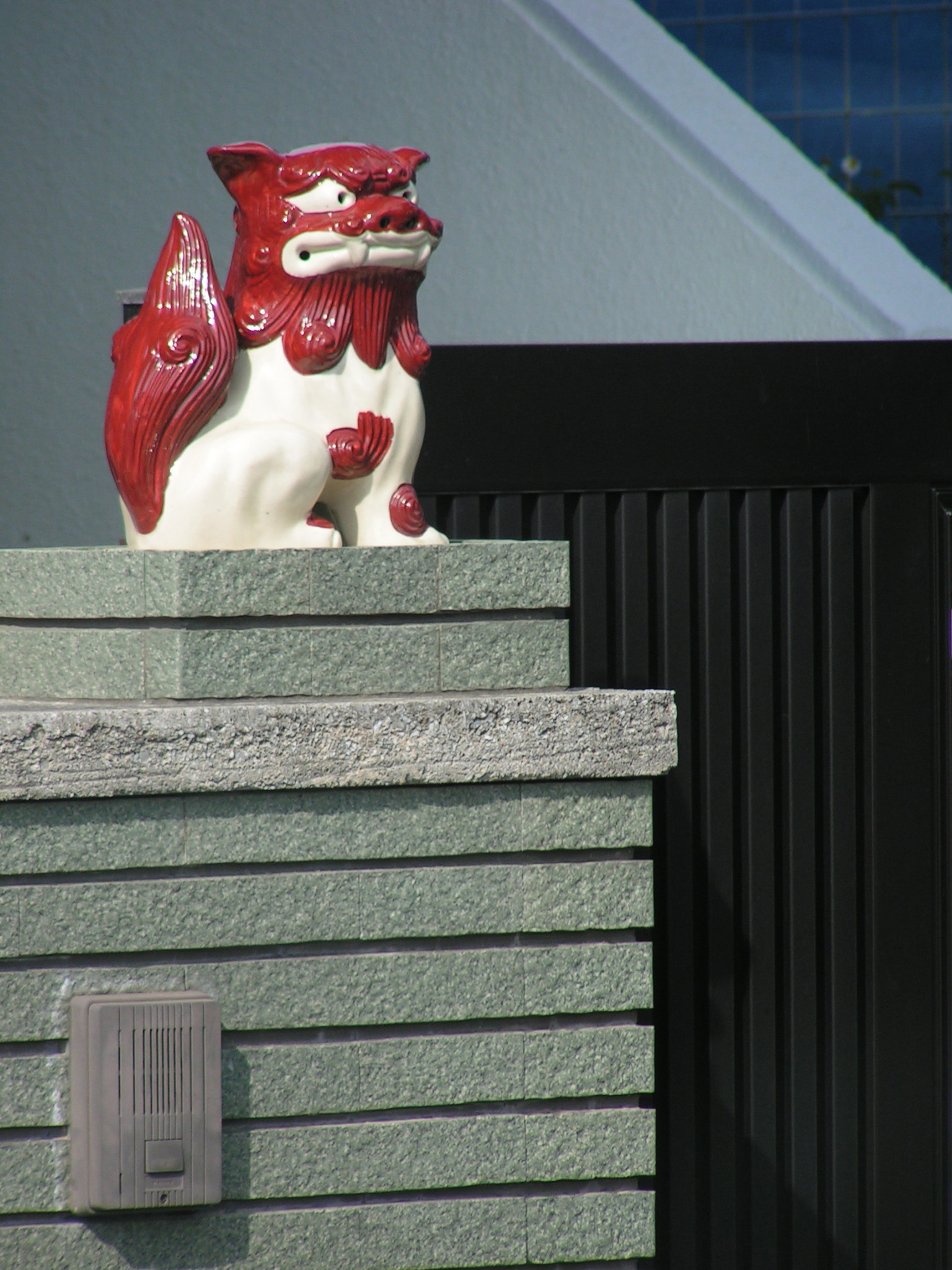
An Okinawan shīsā

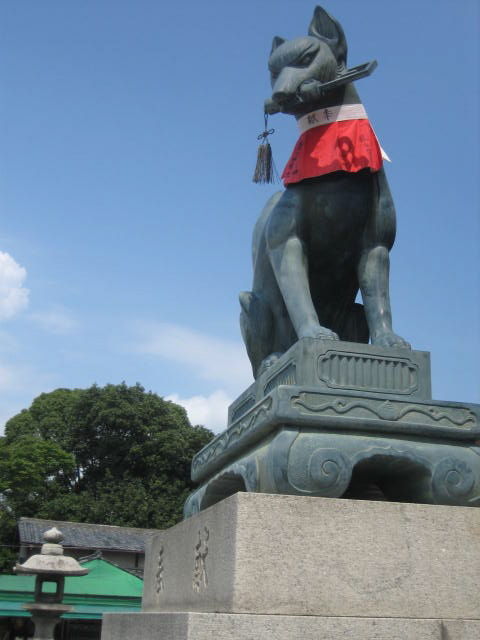
A fox in front of an Inari shrine with a key in its mouth

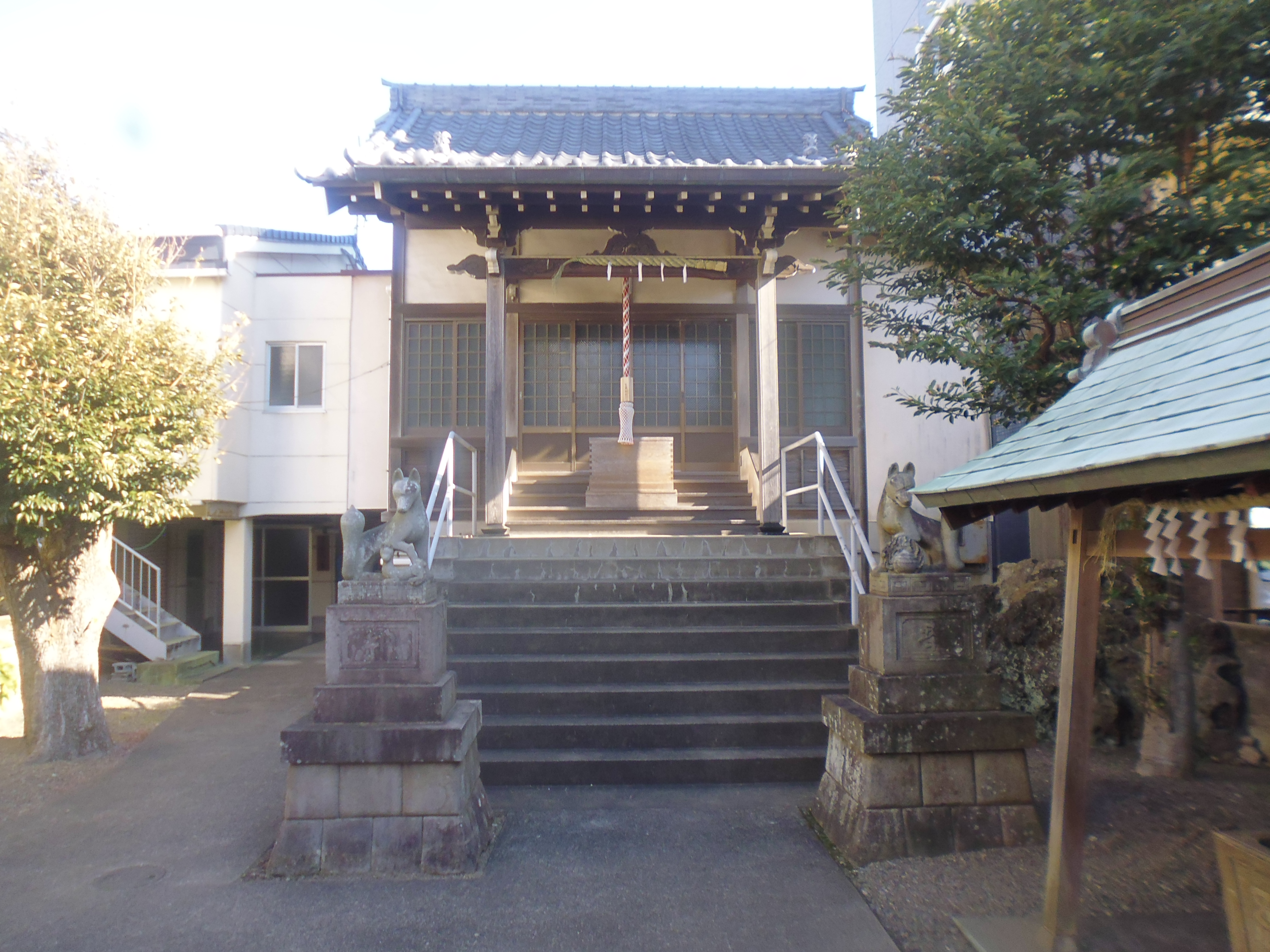
Pair of fox guardians with kit at Numazu Aratama Inari Jinja

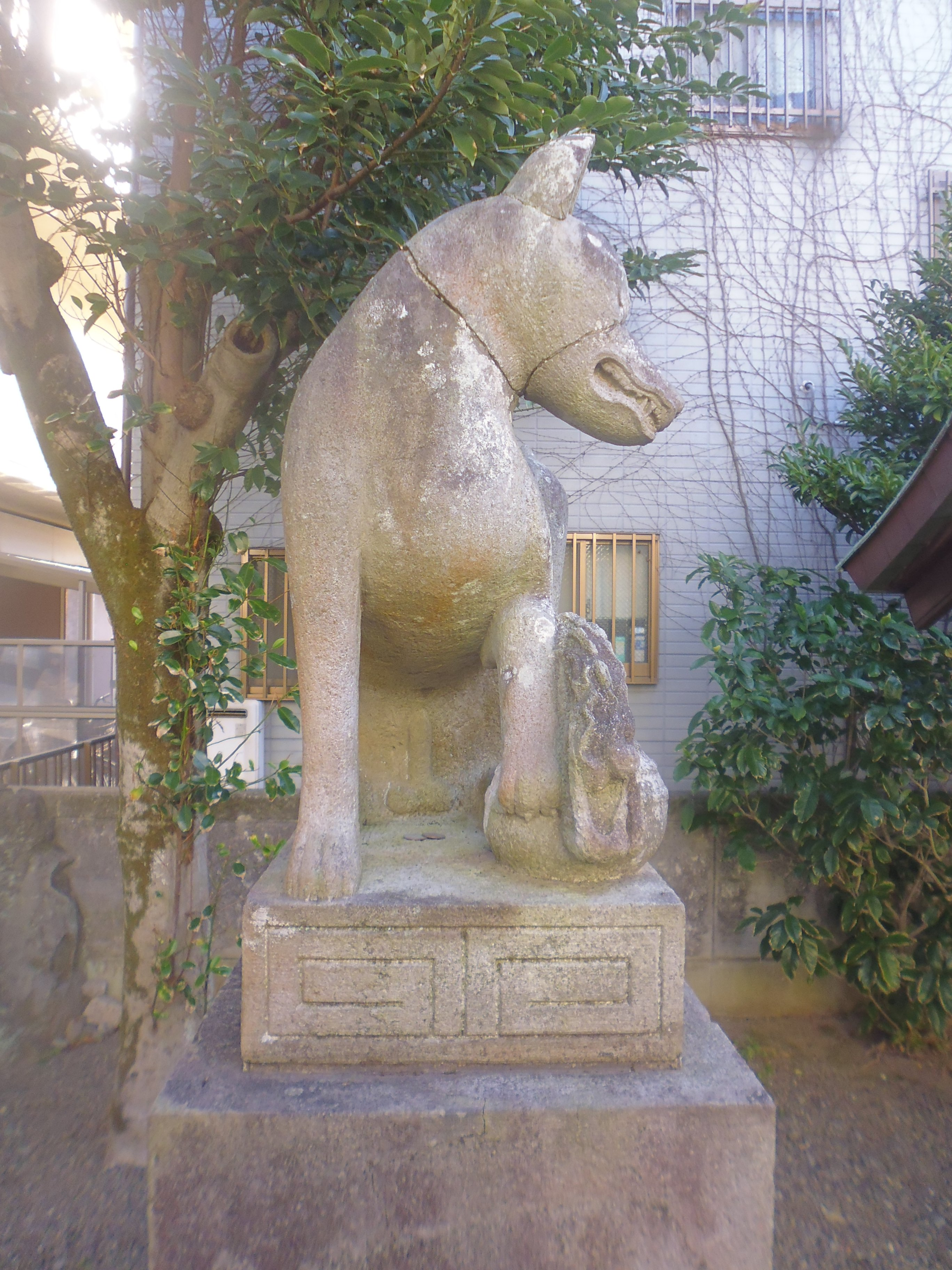
Detail view of the right fox guardian of the shrine Aratama Inari Jinja in Numazu with visible male genitalia

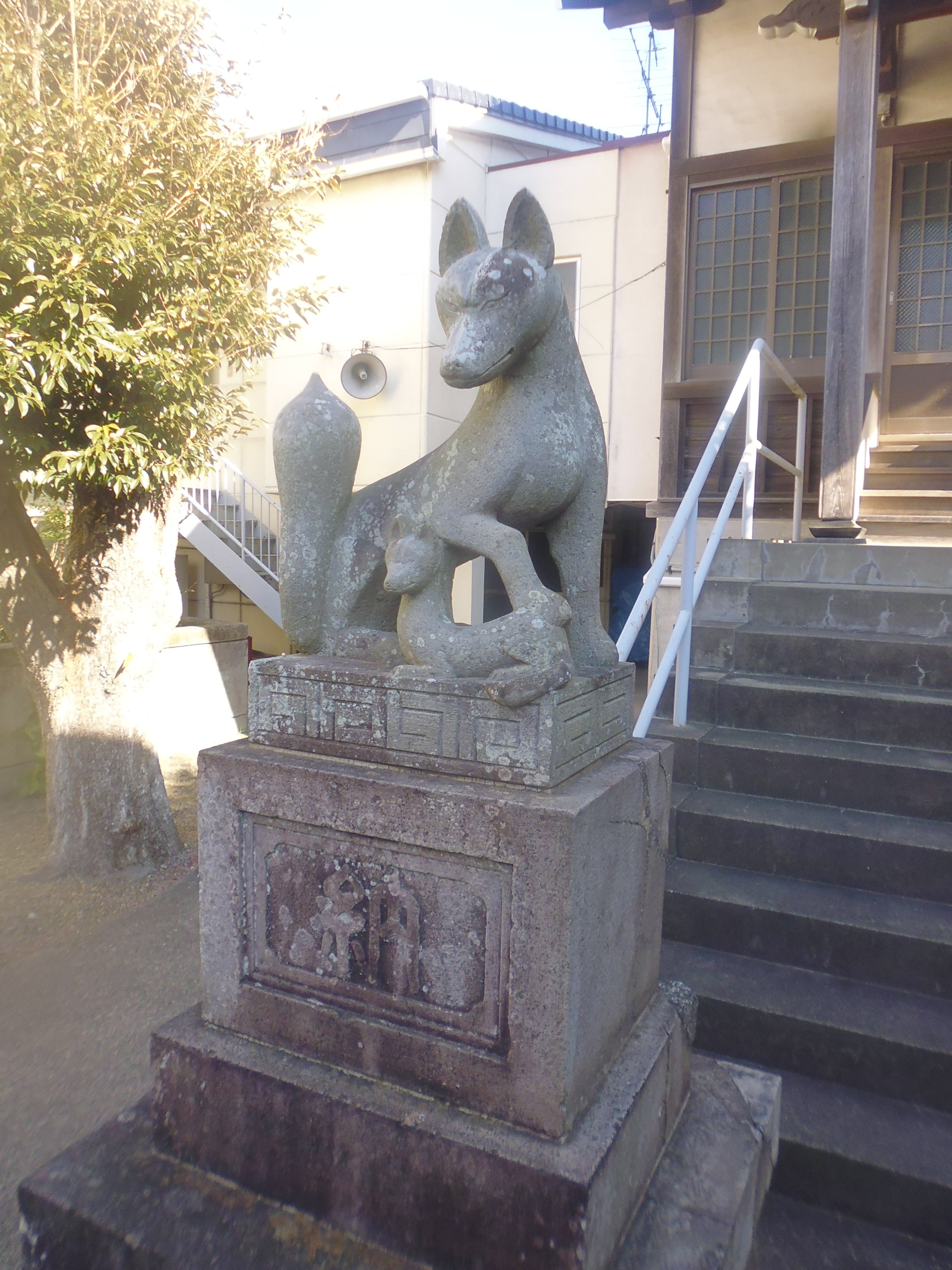
Detail view of the left fox guardian of the shrine Aratama Inari Jinja in Numazu with kit

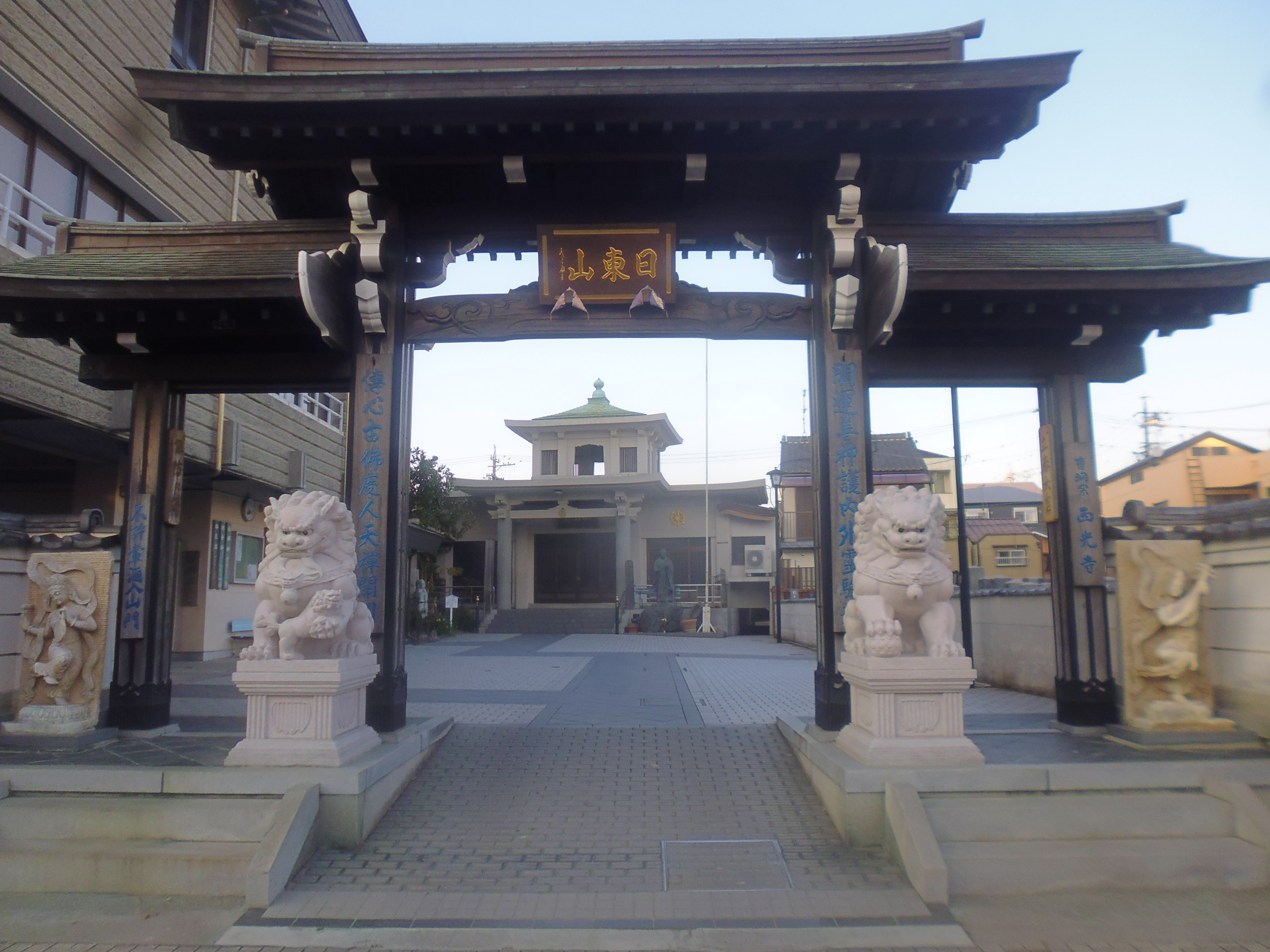
Komainu outside the gate of Saikouji in Toyohashi

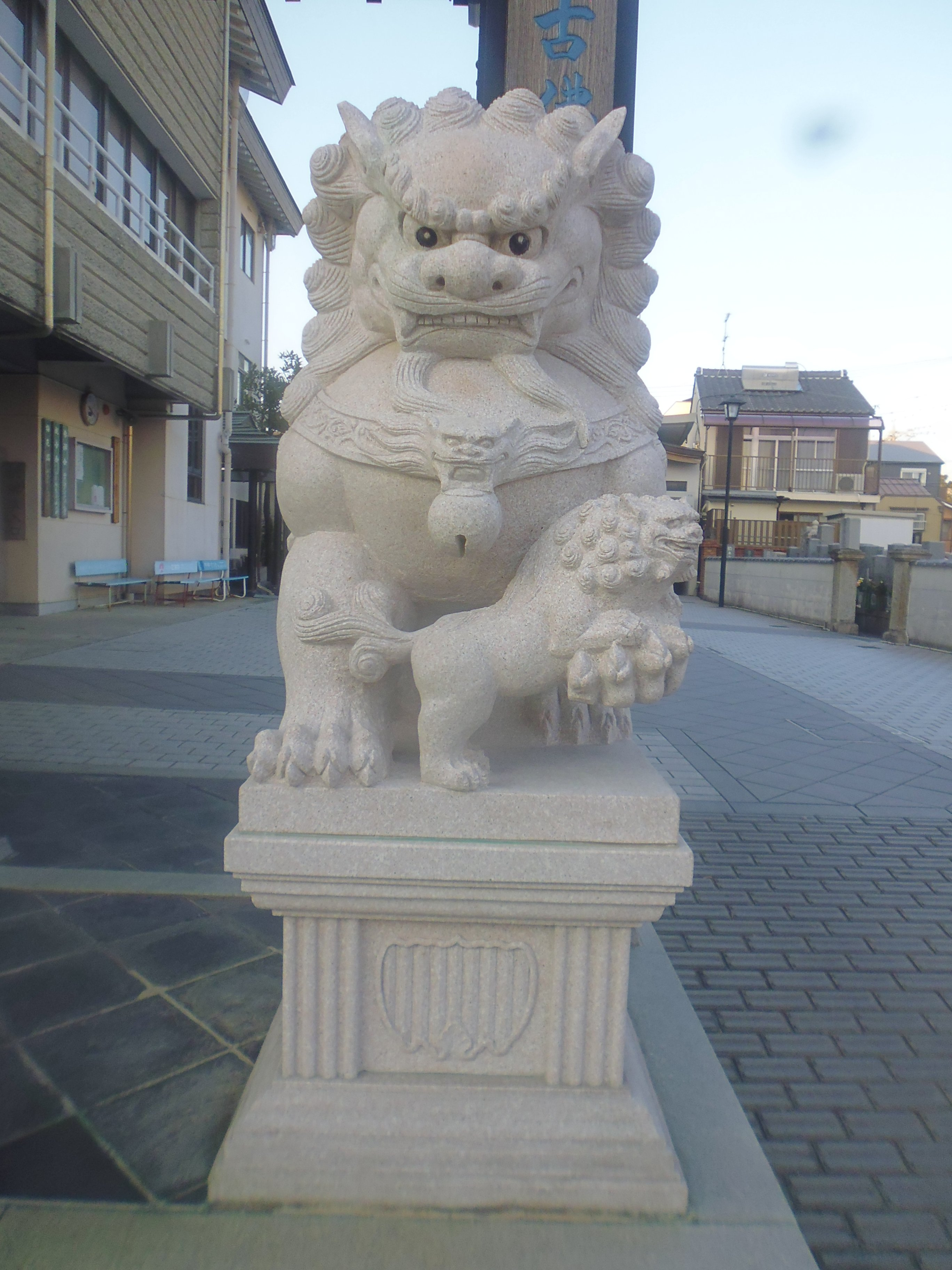
Detail view of left Komainu outside the gate of Saikouji in Toyohashi with cub

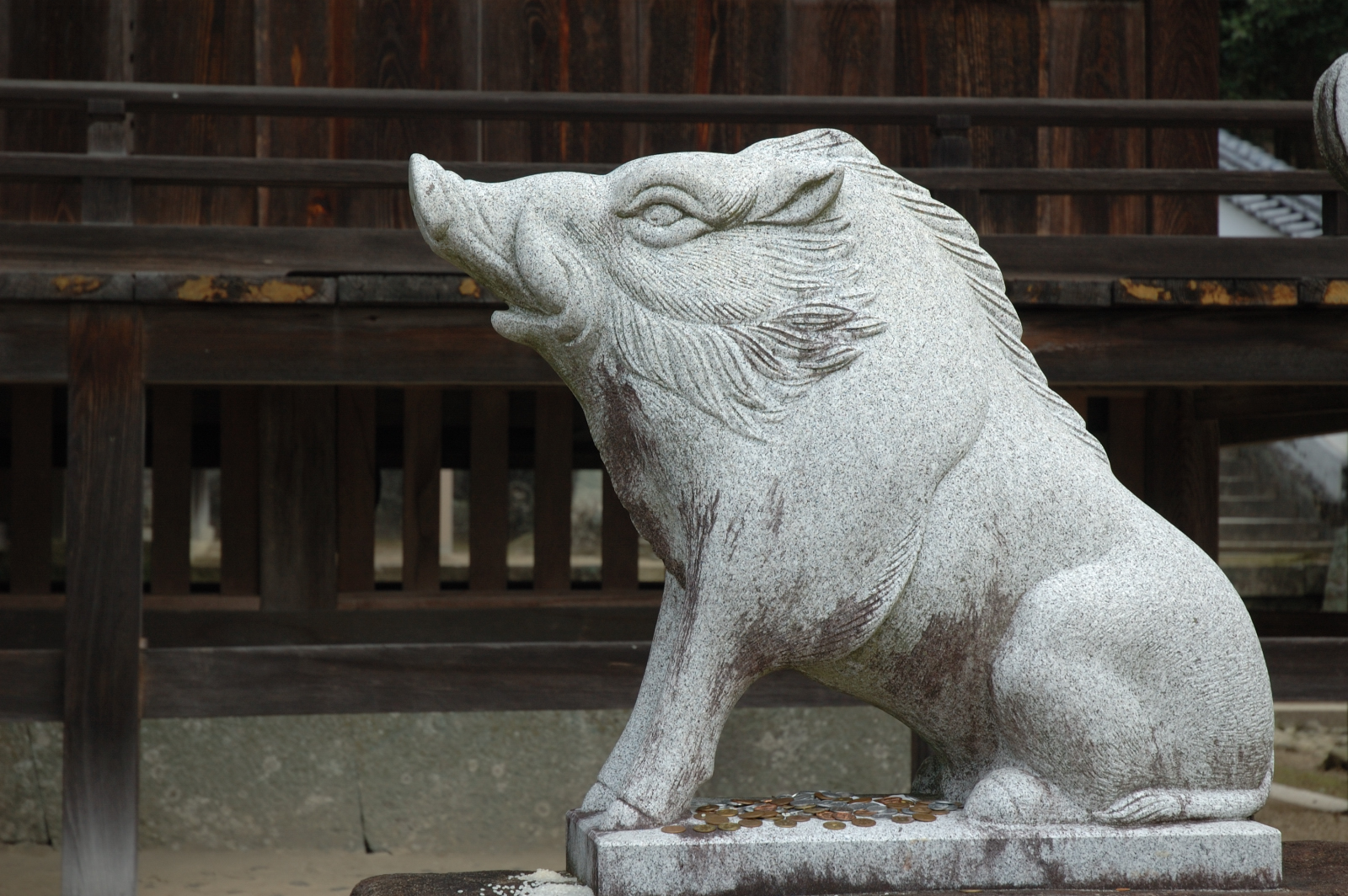
A guardian wild boar

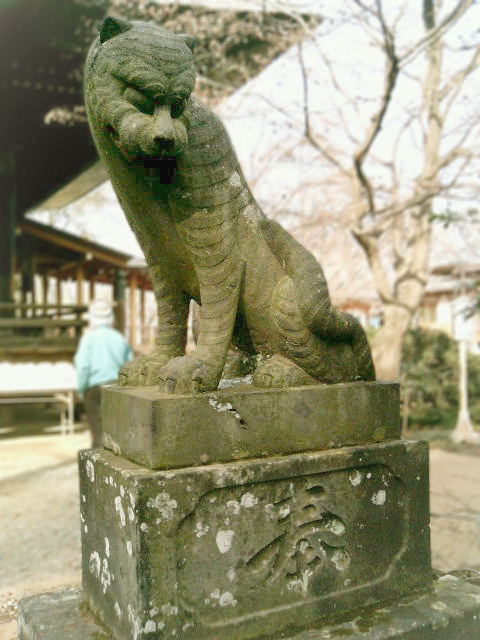
A guardian komatora (狛虎)

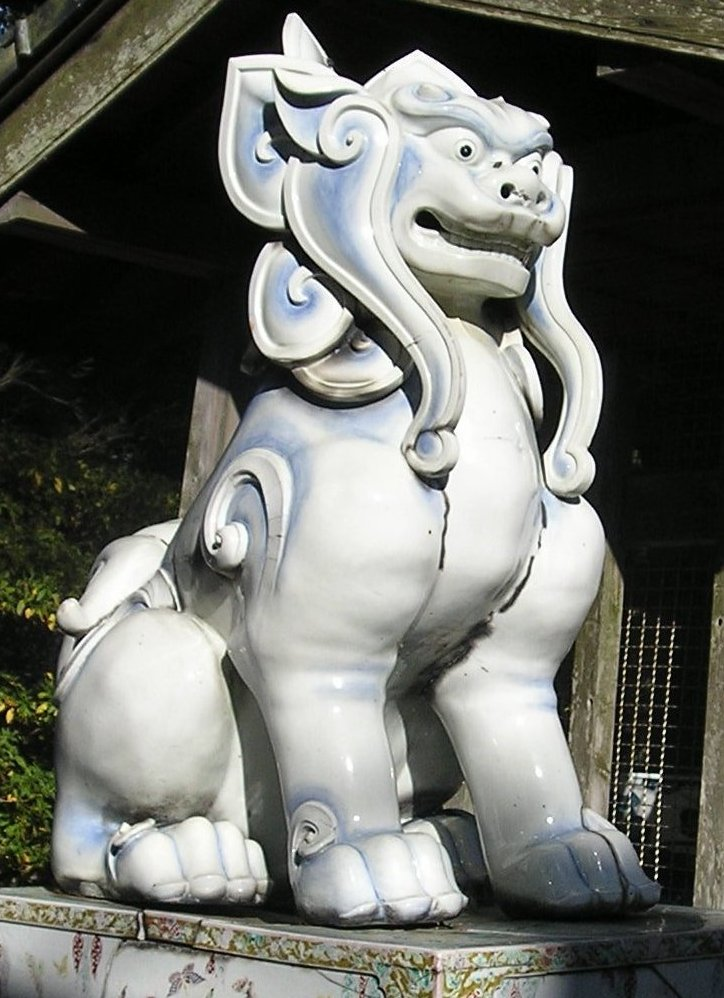
A komainu at Tozan Shrine in Arita, Saga Prefecture, is made of porcelain.

== See also ==
- Chinese guardian lions
- Chinthe
- Kitsune
- Nio
- Xiezhi
