= Inari shrine =

Type of Japanese shrine

An Inari shrine (稲荷神社, Inari jinja) is a type of Japanese shrine used to worship the kami Inari. Inari is a popular deity associated with foxes, rice, household wellbeing, business prosperity, and general prosperity. Inari shrines are typically constructed of white stucco walls with red-lacquered woodwork, and their entrances are marked by vermilion torii. Both Buddhist and Shinto Inari shrines are located throughout Japan.

== Origins ==
The original legend of Inari as described in the Yamashiro fudoki is the story of Hata no Irogu, who used sticky rice for target practice. Legend states that once an arrow pierces the rice, the rice would transform into a white bird and fly to the peak of Mount Mitsumine. Upon its arrival to the mountain, the white bird changed back into rice plants.

The development of Inari shrines began in the ninth century when Inari was appointed the protector kami for the Toji temple at Kyoto by Kobo Daishi, the founder of Shingon Buddhism. Kobo Daishi's recognition of the deity played a large part in the advancement of Inari worship. Recorded legend describes Kobo Daishi's ascent of Inari mountain, where he meets an old man and recognizes him as the rice kami, Inari. Kobo Daishi understood Inari's significance and built a shrine for the kami and inscribed on it the Chinese characters for "rice" and "sack".

The spread of Inari worship first began through the kami's adoption as a yashikigami, which functioned as an estate deity that are commonly enshrined on family land. Inari worship expanded further as it was adopted by merchants of developing cities and became the kami of business. In the eighteenth and nineteenth centuries, the practice of dividing and re-enshrining deities became a common practice, especially in the case of Inari. The reason for this was to increase the status of the deity's town or patron. This practice continues today, and the Motomiya festival is held annually in celebration of the roughly one thousand enshrinements of the Inari kami. This number includes small household shrines and shrines belonging to other public institutions.

There are many different variations of Inari origin myths, many of which developed and changed based on local and personal worship practices. The function of Inari as a deity is fluid as over time, the term "Inari" has begun to encompass a wide variety of deities and beliefs.

When Buddhism first came to Japan during the Asuka period (6th century), many Buddhist temples were attached to Shinto shrines, blurring the line between the two beliefs. It is said that in the 12th century, Prince Kangan Giin had a dream of the Buddhist goddess Dakini-Shinten riding a white fox with Dakini-Shinten thus becoming the manifestation of the Shinto goddess Ukanomitama-no-mikoto. During the separation of Buddhism from Shinto during the Meiji restoration, Buddhist Inari temples survived by asserting Kangan Giin's belief and that they primarily worshipped Dakini-Shinten, not the fox, and that their congregation was only paying respect to the fox as her companion, which allowed them to continue to honor both.

== Enshrined Deity ==
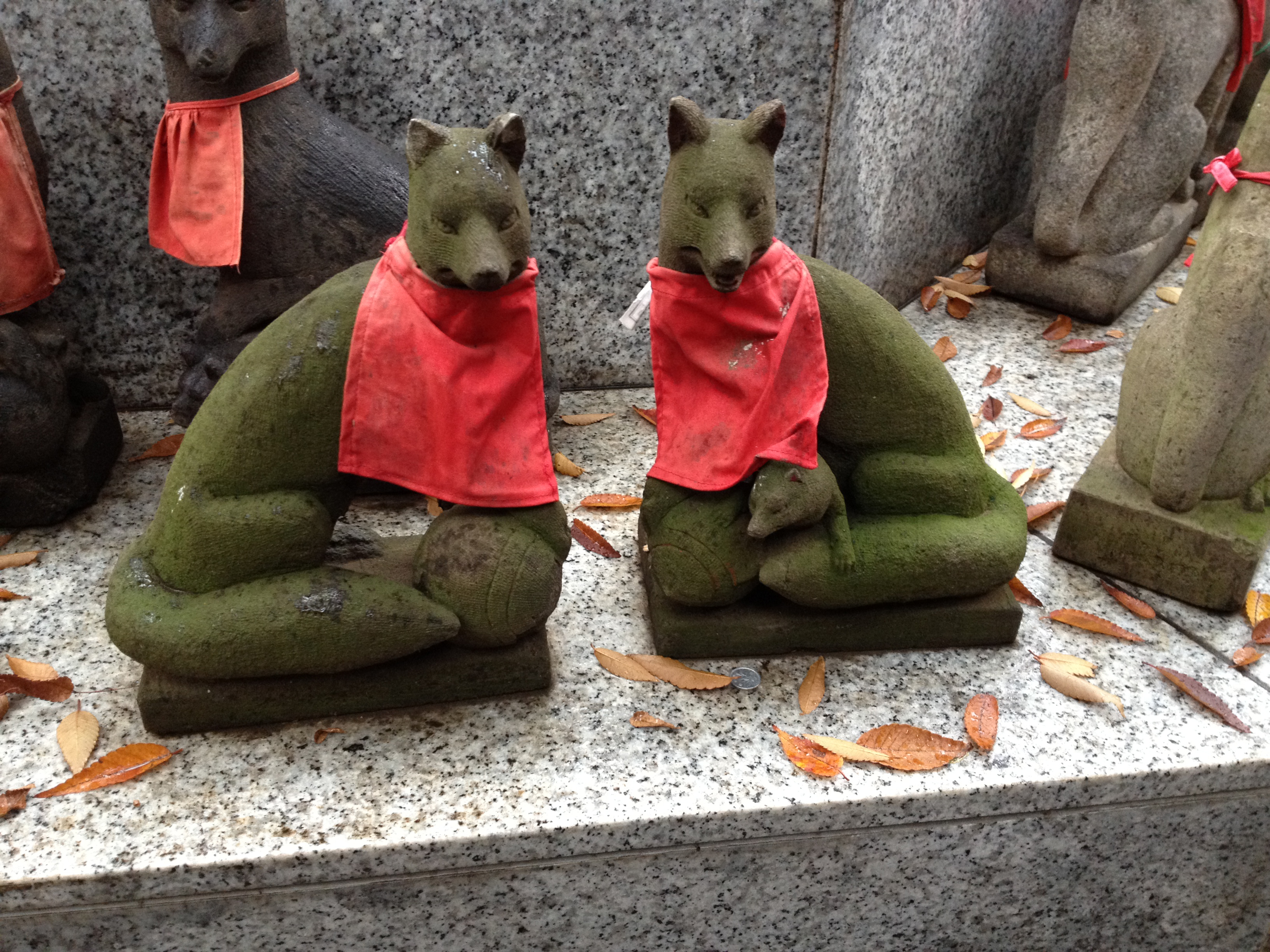
Inari Okami Kitsune (fox) deity

Inari or Inari Okami is the Japanese kami of improvement in the performing arts, household wellbeing, business prosperity, and general prosperity. Inari is also attributed to rice, sake, tea, fertility, foxes, agriculture, and industry. The word “Inari” is an abbreviated term for “Ine Nari” or “Ine ni naru”, which translates to “reaping of rice”. The ancient Japanese word stems from the importance of rice in the daily Japanese diet and symbolizes the miracles of heaven and earth. As one of the principal deities of Shinto, Inari houses, feeds, and protects all people so that they may live a fulfilling life. Inari is one of the most widely venerated kami in Japanese culture.

== Shrines and offerings ==
=== Architecture ===
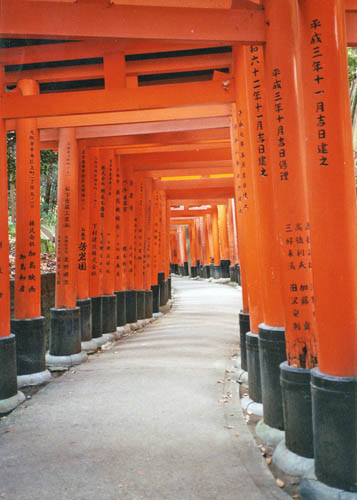
The Thousand-Torii Path at Fushimi in Kyoto.

Inari is a popular deity associated with both Shinto and Buddhist shrines located throughout Japan. According to a 2007 report from Kokugakuin University, 2970 shrines are dedicated to Inari. This number includes only Shinto shrines that are registered as religious corporations and are a part of the Association of Shinto Shrines. Small roadside or field shrines, shrines kept in homes or corporate offices, and Buddhist temples were not included in this statistic, but if they were, the number might increase by a large amount. Inari worship continues to center around folk-religion practices and remains unchanged by Meiji Restorations. Inari shrines are well known and remain some of the most familiar and recognizable shrines to the Japanese people.

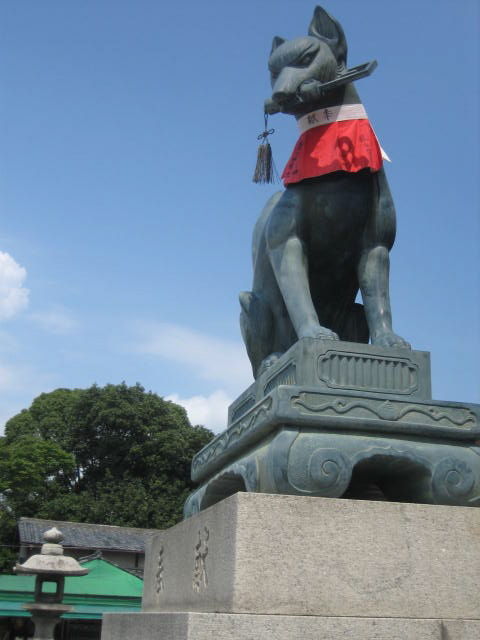
Kitsune holding a key in its mouth at Fushimi Inari

The entrance to an Inari shrine is typically marked by one or more vermilion torii and images of foxes, which are often adorned with red yodarekake (votive bibs) by worshippers out of respect. The color red has come to be identified with Inari because of the prevalence of its use among Inari shrines and their torii. The main Inari shrine is the Fushimi Inari-taisha in Fushimi-ku, Kyoto, where the path to the shrine is marked by around a thousand torii.

Inari shrines typically possess guardian figures in the form of foxes or kitsune. These guardian figures are messengers of Inari but are commonly thought of as the deity itself. The kitsune statues typically come in pairs, and each represent a male and female. Often these fox statues hold symbolic items in their mouths or beneath their front paws. The items may include jewels or keys, which are most common, but sheaves of rice, scrolls, or fox cubs are also popular. Almost every Inari shrine, no matter how small, will feature a pair of these statues, usually flanking or on the altar or in front of the main sanctuary. The statues are rarely realistic; they are typically stylized, portraying seated animals looking forward with their tails in the air. Despite these common characteristics, the statues are highly individualistic in nature and no two are exactly the same. Today, fox statues found at entrances signify the presence of an Inari shrine.

=== Offerings ===
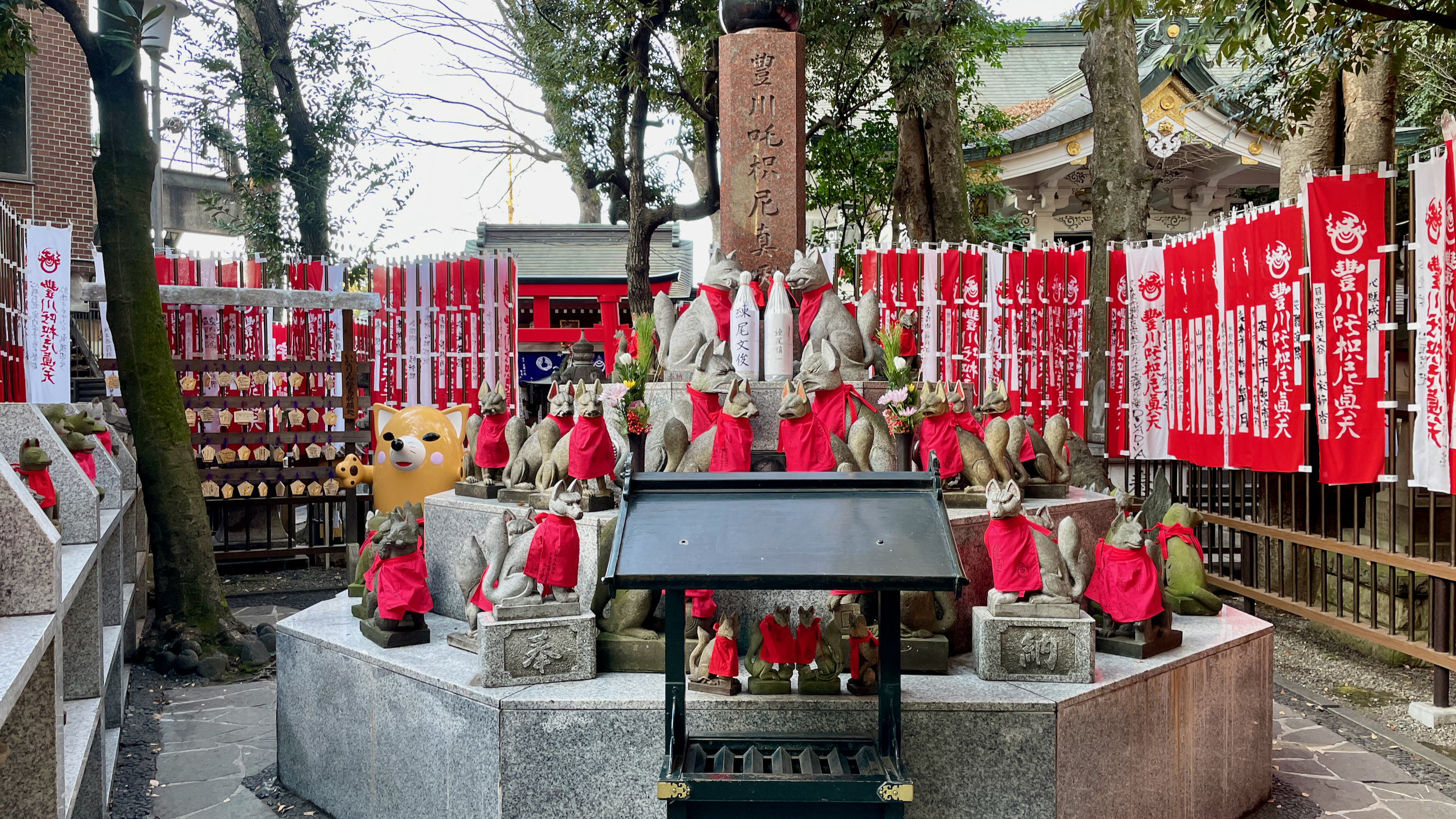
Toyokawa Inari Tokyo is known for its hundreds of Kitsune statues.

Offerings of rice, sake, and other foods are given at the shrine to appease and please these kitsune messengers, who are then expected to plead with Inari on the worshipper's behalf. Inari-zushi, a Japanese sushi roll of rice-packed fried tofu, is another popular offering. Fried tofu is believed to be a favorite food of Japanese foxes, and an Inari-zushi roll has pointed corners that resemble fox ears, thus reinforcing the association. Priests do not normally offer food to the deity, but it is common for shops that line the approach to an Inari shrine to sell fried tofu for devotees to purchase and use as an offering. Fox statues are often offered to Inari shrines by worshippers, and on occasion a stuffed and mounted fox is presented to a temple. At one time, some temples were home to live foxes that were venerated, but this is not current practice. The Toyokawa Inari temple has a sign noting that live foxes were kept on site in the 1920s.

== Notable shrines ==
=== Shinto Shrines ===
The following are Shinto shrines dedicated to the worship of Inari.

- Fushimi Inari-taisha - Fushimi-ku, Kyoto — Sōhonsha (the head shrine) of Inari shrines.
- Kasama Inari Shrine - Kasama, Ibaraki
- Musashino Inari Shrine - Nerima, Tokyo
- Namiyoke Inari Shrine - Chūō, Tokyo
- Anamori Inari Shrine - Ōta, Tokyo
- Taikodani Inari Shrine - Tsuwano, Shimane
- Shiwa Inari Shrine - Shiwa, Iwate
- Takahashi Inari Shrine - Kumamoto
- Takayama Inari Shrine - Tsugaru, Aomori
- Tamatsukuri Inari Shrine - Chūō-ku, Osaka
- Takekoma Inari Shrine - Iwanuma, Miyagi — the second-oldest Inari shrine.
- Yakyu Inari Shrine - Higashimurayama, Tokyo
- Yūtoku Inari Shrine - Kashima, Saga

=== Buddhist Temples ===
The following are Buddhist temples dedicated to the worship of Inari.

- Toyokawa Inari Betsuin - Toyokawa, Aichi — Sōhonzan (the head temple) of Inari temples.
- Toyokawa Inari Tokyo - Akasaka, Tokyo — Tokyo branch of the above, known for its hundreds of Inari statues.
- Saijo Inari - Okayama

== See also ==
- Hachiman shrine – the second most numerous type of Shinto shrine
