= Tōzan Shrine =

Shinto shrines in Saga Prefecture, Japan

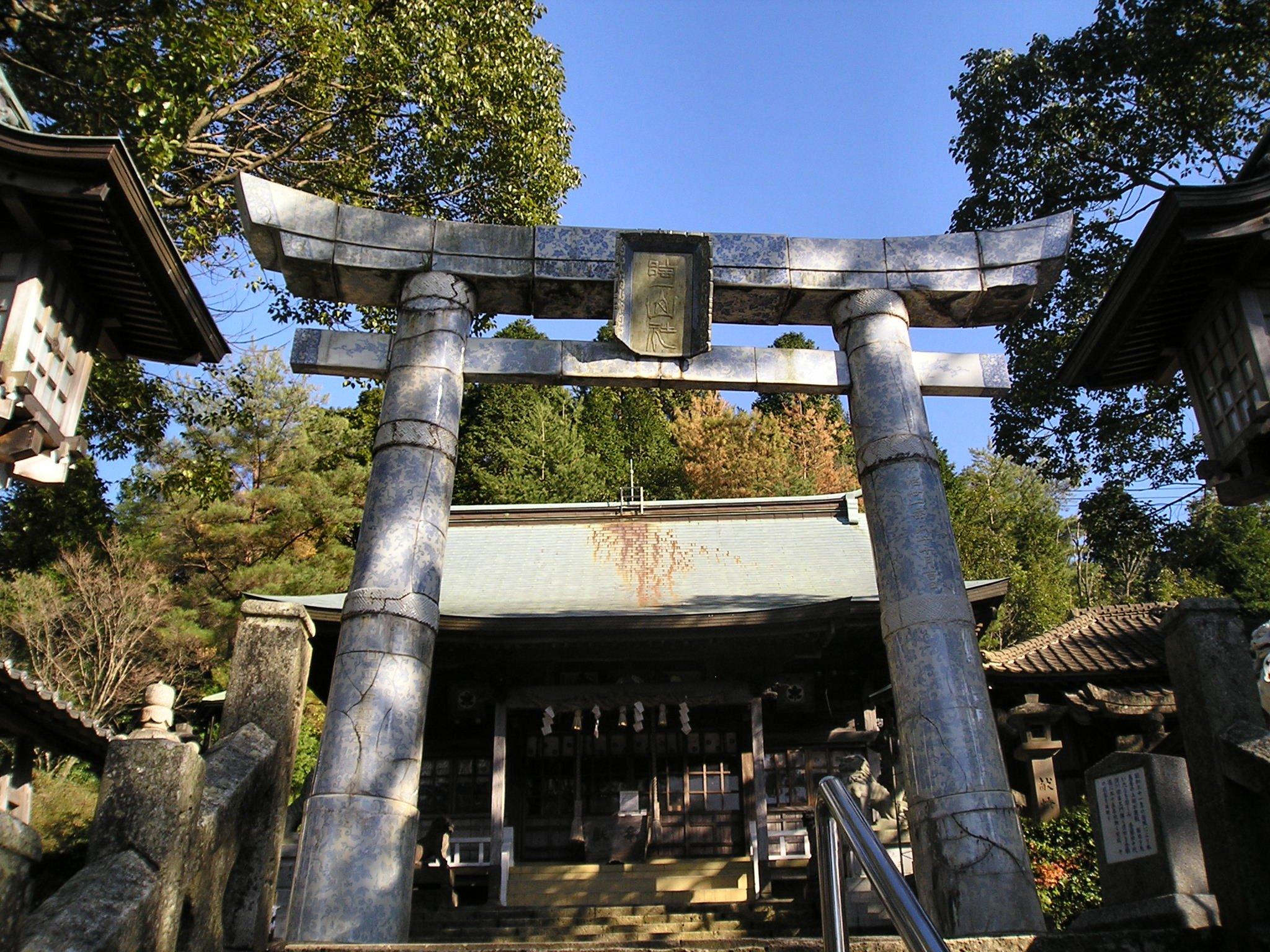
- A porcelain torii archway

- Location within Japan

Religion
- Affiliation: Shinto

Location
- Interactive map of Tōzan Shrine
- Coordinates: 33°11′19.9″N 129°53′57.9″E

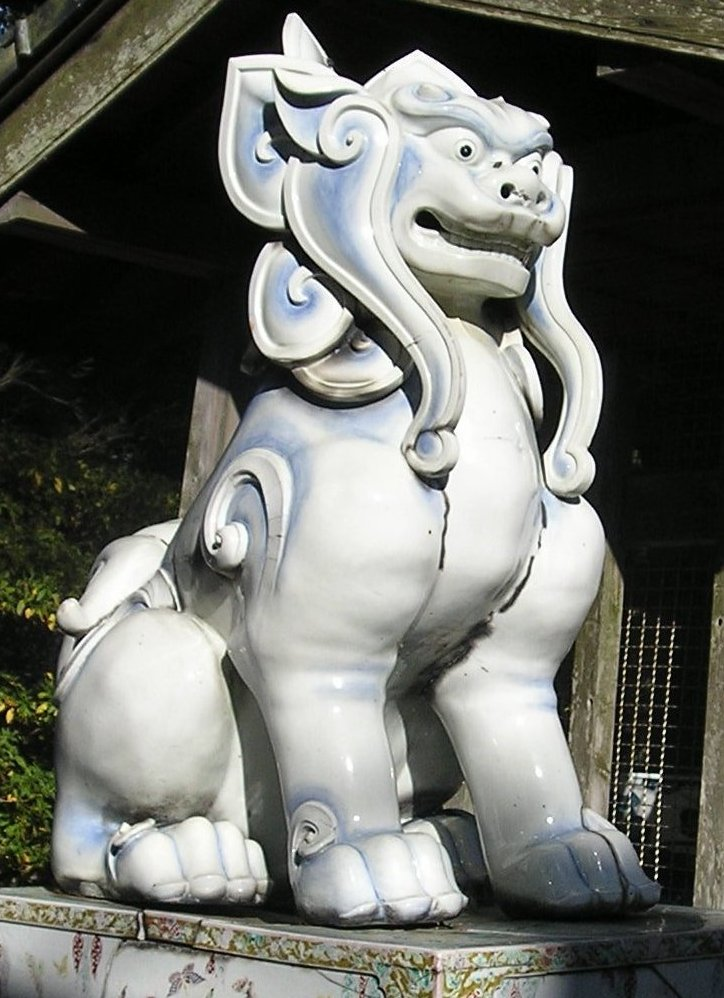
A komainu made of porcelain

The Tōzan or Sueyama Shrine (陶山神社) is located in Arita, Nishimatsuura District, Saga Prefecture. The shrine has a porcelain archway and other items of porcelain which, at other shrines, are usually made of stone. This Shinto shrine was and still is particularly revered by Arita's ceramists.

The shrine was founded as Arita Sarayama Sōbyō Hachimangū (有田皿山宗廟八幡宮) in 1658, and dedicated to Emperor Ōjin and Nabeshima Naoshige, the latter known for known for re-settling potters from Korea in the area. In 1871, the shrine was renamed Sueyama-Jinja (陶山神社), literally "ceramic mountain shrine"; Tōzan is an alternative reading of the kanji for Sueyama. In 1917, a memorial to the semi-legendary potter Yi Sam-pyeong (Kanagae Sambee) was built on a hill overlooking the town of Arita to commemorate the 300th anniversary of Arita's porcelain.

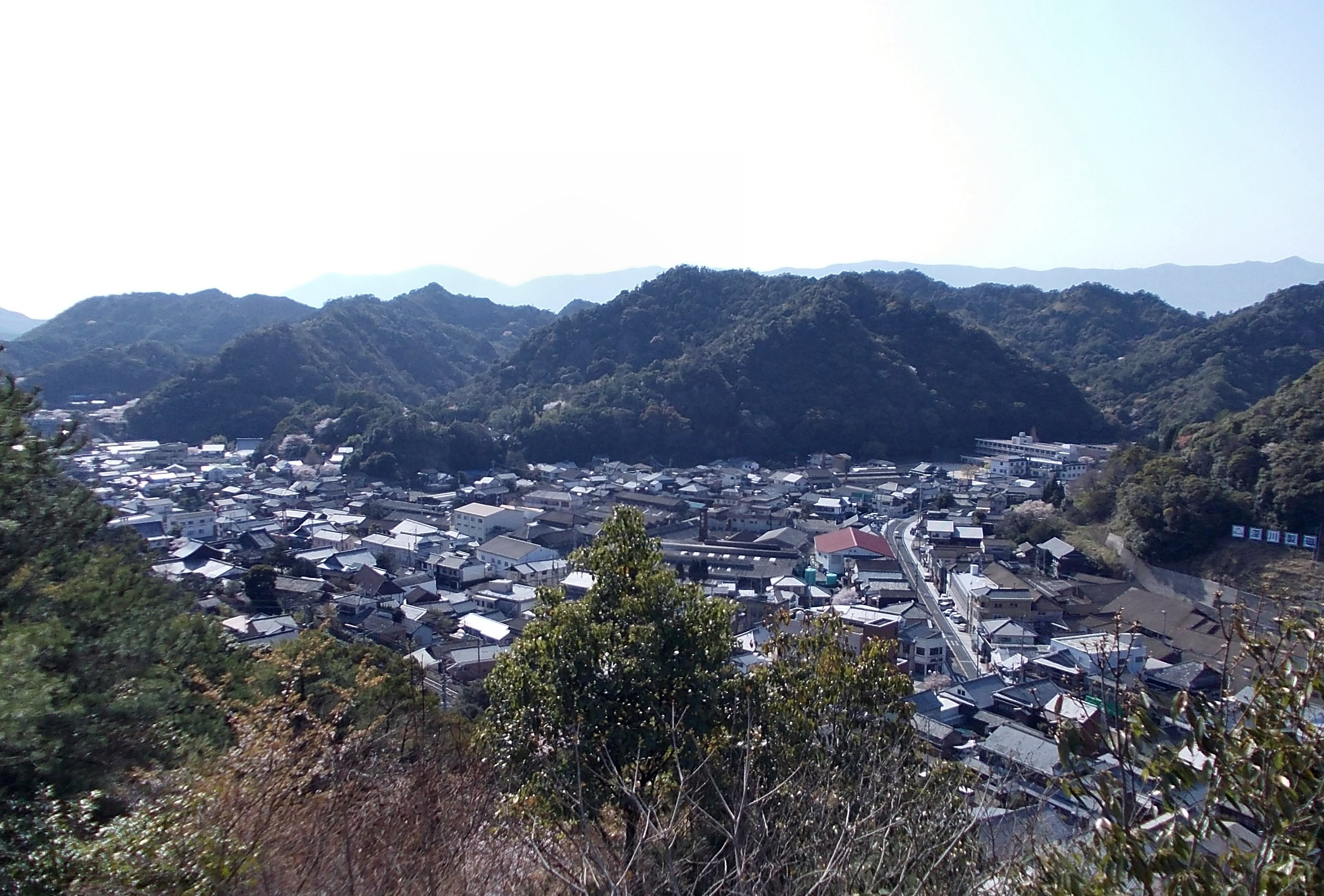
The view of Arita from the Yi Sam-pyeong Monument

The 1888 torii (a Shinto shrine archway), uniquely constructed of porcelain, was designated a Tangible Cultural Property on 28 April 2000.
