= Namiyoke Inari Shrine =

Shinto shrine in Tokyo, Japan

Namiyoke Inari Shrine 波除稲荷神社
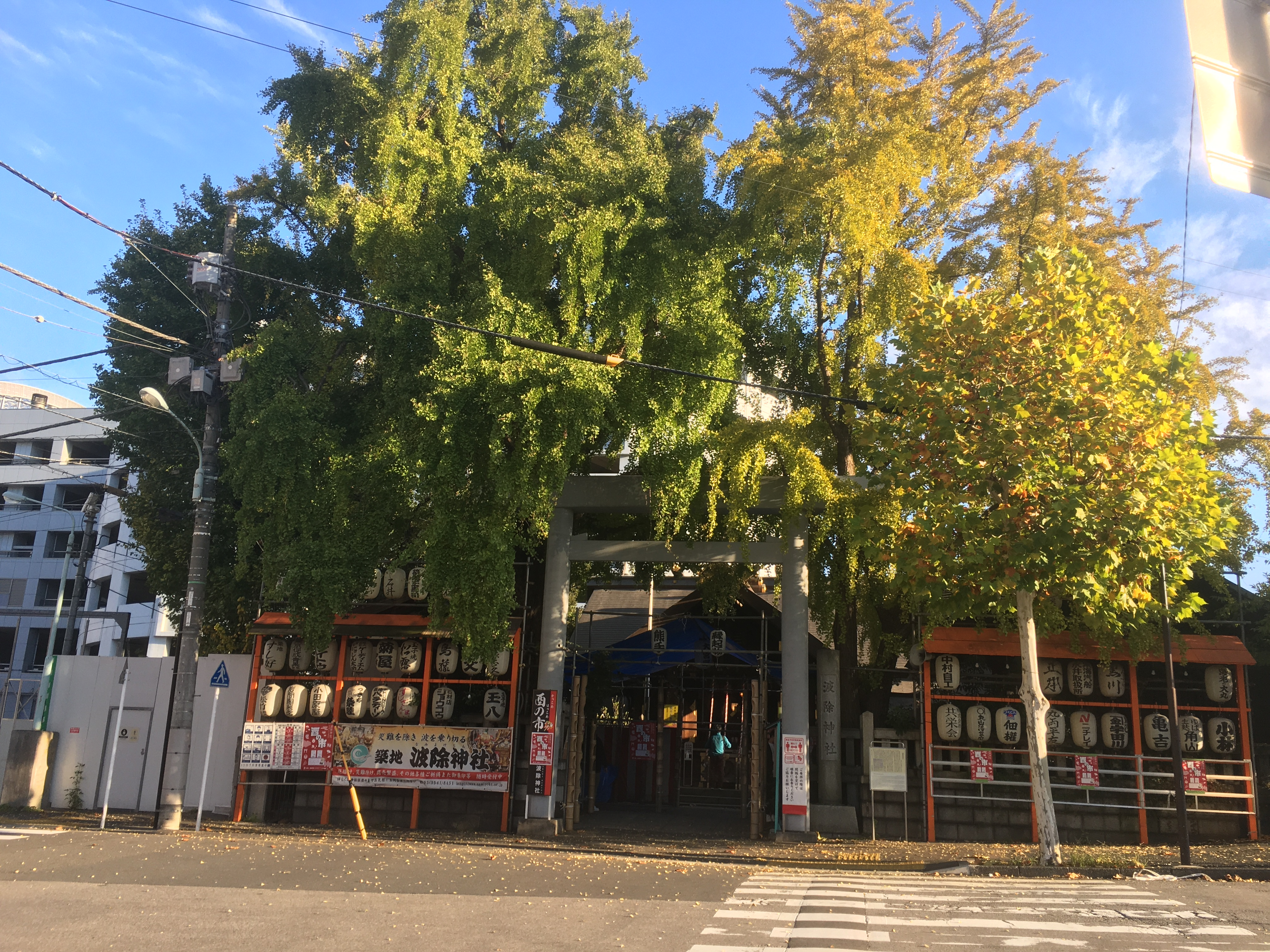

- Location within Japan

Religion
- Affiliation: Shinto
- Type: Inari Shrine

Location
- Location: 6-20-37, Tsukiji, Chūō, Tokyo 104-0045
- Interactive map of Namiyoke Inari Shrine 波除稲荷神社
- Coordinates: 35°39′48.65″N 139°46′17.62″E

Architecture
- Established: 1659

Website
- www.namiyoke.or.jp/index.html

Namiyoke Inari Shrine (波除稲荷神社, Namiyoke inari-jinja) is a Shinto shrine located in Tsukiji, Chūō, Tokyo. It is an Inari shrine that was built on the water's edge when this part of Tokyo (then Edo) was created from landfill after the Great Fire of Meireki in 1657. The name of the shrine literally means "protection from waves."

After the Tsukiji fish market was established in its present location after the 1923 Great Kantō earthquake, the Namiyoke Inari Shrine became an unofficial guardian shrine for the marketplace and its traders. The courtyard of the shrine is dotted with various memorial plaques and carvings donated by trade groups in the marketplace.

Even in the modern period, Namiyoke Inari Shrine has remained associated with the Tsukiji fish market community. Fishermen and market vendors have traditionally offered prayers at the shrine, which contains memorial monuments dedicated to various seafood products, such as fish and shellfish, as well as ingredients used in sushi preparation. The shrine also holds seasonal rites and festivals connected to these traditions.
