= Yi Sam-pyeong =

Japanese potter

Japanese reading of the alleged Korean name
- Kanji: 李参平/李三平
- Kana: り さんぺい
Transcriptions
- Romanization: Ri Sanpei

Name after the naturalization
- Kanji: 金ヶ江三兵衛
- Kana: かながえ さんべえ
Transcriptions
- Romanization: Kanagae Sanbee

Alleged Korean name
- Hangul: 이삼평
- Hanja: 李參平/李三平
Transcriptions
- Revised Romanization: I Sampyeong
- McCune–Reischauer: I Samp'yŏng

Kanagae Sanbee (金ヶ江三兵衛) or Yi Sam-pyeong was a Japanese potter who is believed to have moved from Korea. He is often considered the father of Arita ware porcelain, although this narrative is today questioned by historians. He is honored at Sueyama Shrine in Arita as the father of Arita ware.

== Popular narrative ==
Although Kanagae Sanbee's existence is not in doubt, contemporary sources barely mention him. The story of "Yi Sam-pyeong" as seen today was gradually developed by the late 19th century by various parties with different intentions. For example, the version presented by Kanagae Sanbee XIV, a descendant of Kanagae Sanbee concerned states.

Toyotomi Hideyoshi's campaign against Korea (1592–98) triggered great progress in Japanese pottery as hundreds of artisans were brought to Japan to encourage technological development. Yi Sam-pyeong is one of the best known potters from Korea.
According to some records of the Kanagae family, he lived for a short period of time in the town of Saga, which was ruled by Nabeshima Naoshige, the de facto founder of the Saga Domain in Kyushu. He was then given to Taku Yasutoshi, the ruler of Taku in central Saga, where he started a pottery but did not succeed. He searched for kaolin, and eventually in 1616 he discovered a kaolin deposit on the Izumi Mountain in Arita, effectively starting the porcelain industry in Japan. For his achievements, he was allowed to take the Japanese name Kanagae Sanbee after his home town Geumgang (Note: Currently Gongju, Chungcheongnam-do, South Korea.).

== The real Kanagae Sanbee ==
The popular narrative was questioned by the Japanese historian Nakamura Tadashi in 1992. He noted that the stories of the founding fathers of early modern pottery, including that of Yi Sam-pyeong, are not confirmed by contemporary sources and were developed as late as the second half of the 18th century. Historian Komiya Kiyora further analyzed the origins of this narrative, largely dismissing it.

No contemporary Korean source mentioned Yi Sam-pyeong. In fact, historical sources, all in Japanese, never refer to him by this name. The alleged Korean name was coined in the late 19th century, as described below. No contemporary source claims that he was hunted for his talent during the Korean campaign, or even that he participated in pottery in Korea. It is not until around 1843 that the official documents of the Saga Domain began to claim that Nabeshima Naoshige, the virtual founder of the domain, brought six or seven talented potters as "living treasures of Japan." This account was taken from a biography of a local governor of western Saga including Arita, written by his son Yamamoto Tsunetomo in 1707. The historical accuracy of his account is questionable, as the mountain where artisans supposedly started pottery has no known remains of kilns. These records made no mention of Kanagae Sanbee or any other potters by name.

The earliest known source mentioning Kanagae Sanbee dates to around 1653, over half a century after his arrival in Japan and only few years before his death. This source, written by Kanagae Sanbee himself, was given to Taku, the ruling family of the region of Taku. In this memorandum, he claimed that after the arrival in Japan, he had taken service with Taku Yasutoshi "for a few years," and then had moved with about 18 people, mostly children, from Taku to Arita in 1616. It is not clear how he supported himself for nearly 20 years between the end of his service and the supposed migration of 1616. Notably, he did not claim to have been a potter before his arrival or have been brought to Japan for his talent. He claimed that he carried (kiln) cars during the 1616 migration and noted that his group included three of the "original potters of Taku" (多久本皿屋), whose identities remain unclear.

Historian Komiya Kiyora points to the existence of pottery even before the Korean campaign of 1592-98. A considerable number of Korean potters were patronized by the Hata clan of Karatsu in northern Saga, which was destroyed by Toyotomi Hideyoshi in 1593. Following this, the kilns in Hata's territory disappeared, and the potters likely became refugees, unable to return to Korea due to the war. Komiya presumes that the "original potters of Taku" were one of these refugee groups and that Kanagae Sanbee learned pottery from them for survival.

Komiya also questions his alleged discovery of a kaolin deposit in Arita and its supposed date of 1616 since the earliest known porcelain from Arita dates to the 1630s and 40s. He suggests that the Saga domain's brief attempt at gold and silver mining may have led to the accidental discovery of kaolin while searching for ore deposits.

Komiya suggests that in 1616, Kanagae Sanbee was likely "banished" from Taku. Historical sources confirm that authorities frequently expelled potters due to conflict arising from the environmental impact of pottery production, which included forest destruction and clashed with agricultural interests. Early pottery did not generate sufficient profit nor possess significant artistic value to warrant protection from authorities. It was only around the 1630s that technological advancements enabled potters to produce more profitable ceramics resembling Chinese styles, leading to their exemption from banishment.

== Development of the narrative ==
Komiya further analyzed historical sources chronologically to trace the development of the narrative surrounding Yi Sam-pyeong.

An appeal dated 1770 from the Kanagae family to the Taku family represents an early version of the foundation myth. The appeal aimed to reverse the Taku family's decision to cease providing a modest salary to the Kanagae family, emphasizing the achievements of their ancestor and asserting his close ties with the Taku family. According to the appeal, Kanagae Sanbee was brought to Japan by Nabeshima Naoshige and initially served him as a storyteller. Expressing his desire to pursue pottery, he later became a retainer of Taku Yasutoshi and relocated to Arita to initiate porcelain production. The appeal credited Kanagae Sanbee as the sole founder of Arita porcelain, although it acknowledged that his accomplishments were not "remembered" by anyone in Arita at the time. This appeal also marks the first known instance where Kanagae Sanbee's original surname was claimed to be Ri (李, Yi).

A memorandum from 1784 or 1796 added another claim to Kanagae Sanbee's achievements: during the Korean campaign of 1592-98, he allegedly risked his life guiding the Nabeshima army. Around 1807, in another appeal to the Taku family, the story was further elaborated: Kanagae Sanbee served Nabeshima Naoshige as a navigator during the campaign, Nabeshima Naoshige brought him to Japan out of fear of retaliation from other Koreans. It was at this time that he disclosed his family's pottery business to Nabehima Naoshige, who permitted him to continue it in Japan. This modified version of the narrative omitted the earlier assertion that he served Nabeshima Naoshige as a storyteller, though it acknowledged that initially, he struggled to survive in the underdeveloped region rather than immediately pursuing pottery. The use of the name Sanpei (三平, or Sam-pyeong) is notable, though uncertain whether it reflects his original name or a "Koreanization" of his Japanese name Sanbee (三兵衛).

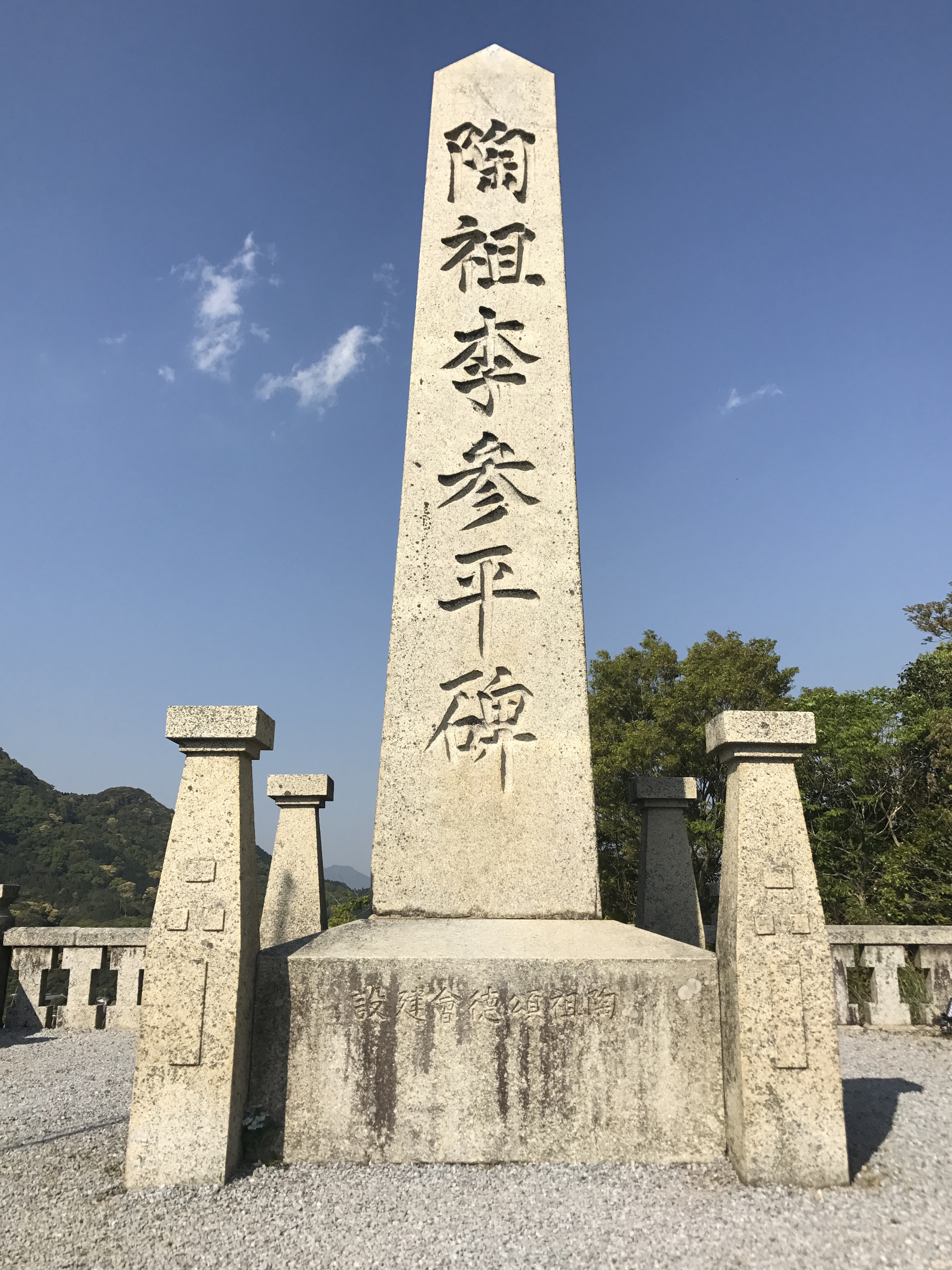
Yi Sam-pyeong Monument

The above documents were presented by the Kanagae family. Historical sources reveal that several other families around Arita had similar and mutually conflicting foundation myths. The unification of these foundation myths into that of Kanagae Sanbee occurred during the Meiji era, or the late 19th century. In the early Meiji era, the people of Arita had no consensus on the history, particularly the origin, of Arita porcelain. The first publication known to spread the myth nationwide was in 1877, which copied the story of the Kanagae family but used the alleged Korean name of Yi Sam-pyeong. In the 1880s, several attempts were made in Arita to build a unified view, and during this process, the story of Kanagae Sanbee, now Yi Sam-pyeong, emerged as the most influential one. This narrative's dominance was reaffirmed in 1917 when a monument titled "Monument for the Father of Porcelain Yi Sam-pyeong" was built in Sueyama Shrine of Arita.
