= Kasama Inari Shrine =

Kasama Inari Jinja 笠間稲荷神社
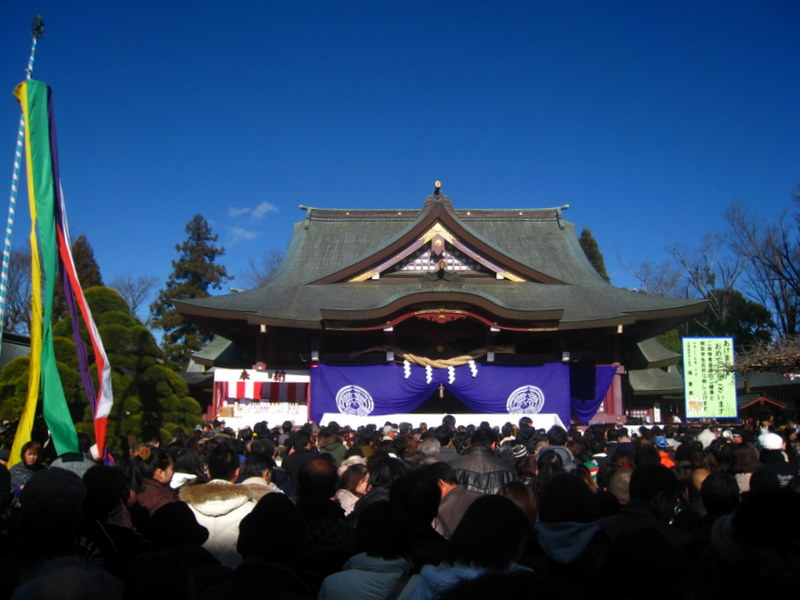
- New Years crowd at Kasama Shrine

- Location within Japan

Religion
- Affiliation: Shinto
- Deity: Uka-no-Mitama-no-Kami as Inari Ōkami
- Type: Inari Shrine

Location
- Location: 1 Kasama, Kasama-shi, Ibaraki-ken; 309-1611 Japan
- Interactive map of Kasama Inari Jinja 笠間稲荷神社

Architecture
- Established: 651

Website
- www.kasama.or.jp/english/index.html

Kasama Inari Shrine (笠間稲荷神社 Kasama Jinja) is one of the three largest Inari Okami shrines in Japan, having been awarded the ancient court rank of Senior First Grade. According to legends associated with the shrine, it was founded in 651 during the reign of Emperor Kotoku, indicating a history extending over some thirteen centuries.

During the Tokugawa or Edo period, Kasama Inari Shrine received the devoted patronage of the feudal lord of the Kasama Domain, and spread its influence not only through the Kantō region but throughout all of Japan. At present, the shrine is visited by more than 3.5 million pilgrims each year.

The shrine is dedicated to Ukanomitama no kami – a spirit with jurisdiction over the five grains and foodstuffs, the life-root kami having mastery over the sources of life itself. According to the oldest collection of Japanese mythology, the Kojiki ("Records of Ancient Matters"), Ukanomitama no kami was the child of Susano no okami and Kamuoichihime no kami. The "Uka" in the name means foodstuffs, indicating the "mysterious spirit dwelling in the grain".
