= Musashino Inari Shrine =

Shinto shrine in Tokyo, Japan

Musashino Inari Shrine 武蔵野稲荷神社
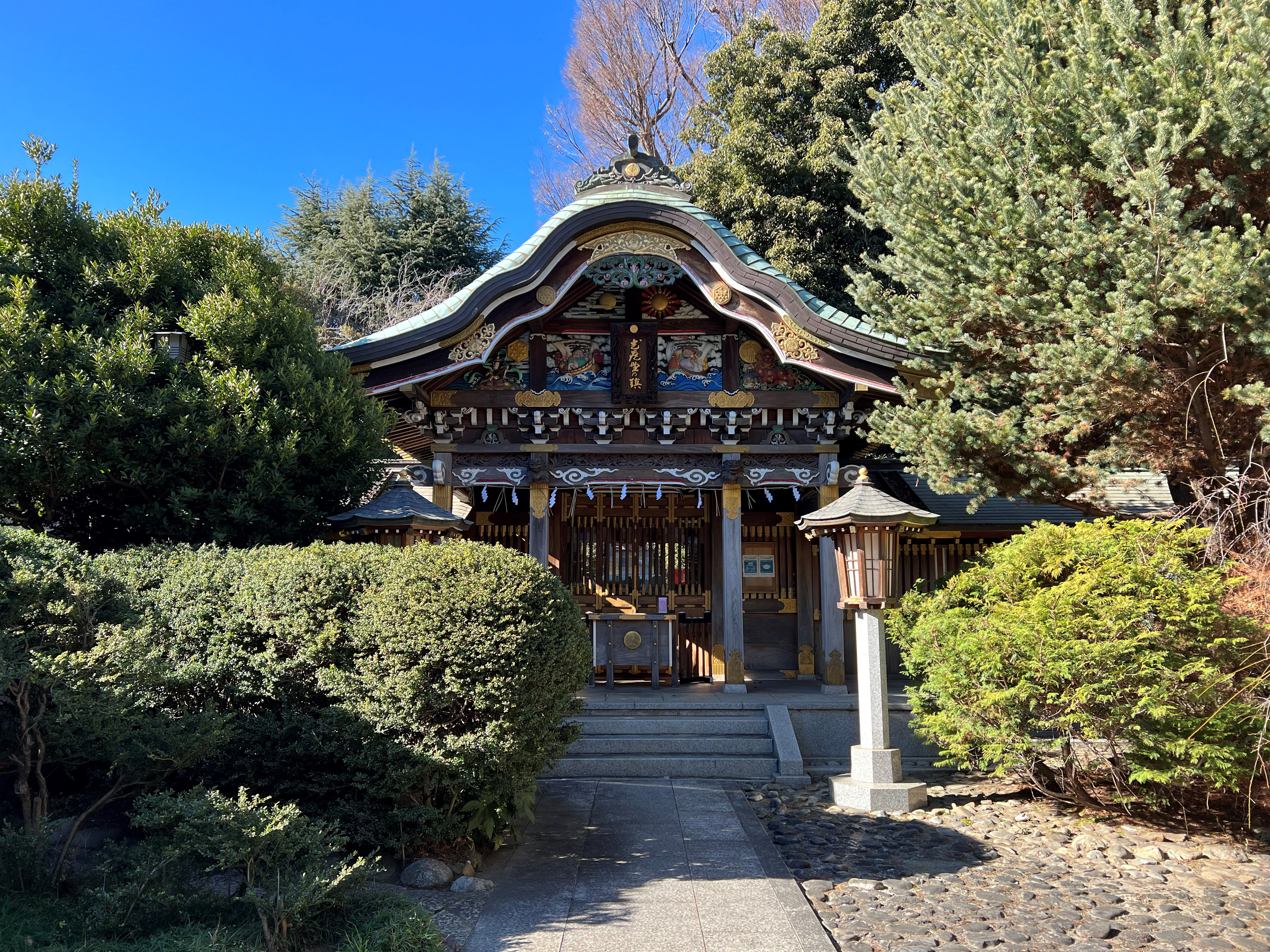

- Location within Japan

Religion
- Affiliation: Shinto
- Deity: Ukanomitama, Tenjin, and Tsukihi-Jūttenjō-Ōkami
- Type: Inari Shrine
- Leadership: Mr. Shiraishi

Location
- Location: 10-1, Sakae-chō, Nerima, Tokyo 176-0006
- Interactive map of Musashino Inari Shrine 武蔵野稲荷神社
- Coordinates: 35°44′17.10″N 139°40′09.80″E

Musashino Inari Shrine (武蔵野稲荷神社, Musashino inari-jinja) is a Shinto shrine located in southeastern part of Nerima, Tokyo. It is an Inari shrine of uncertain origin, however rebuilt after Hinomoto Shinseikō, a shinshūkyō (Japanese new religion) based on Tenrikyo, took over the shrine. It is also known by the nickname, Ekota-no-O-Inari-san (江古田のお稲荷さん), but it used to be Nerima-no-Inari-san (練馬のお稲荷さん).

Despite having three enshrined deities, the Association of Shinto Shrines only accepts the deity, Inari, in the shrine.

== History ==
Much of how Musashino Inari Shrine was established is lost in history and it was traditionally a popular place among locals for Inari worship from the middle of the 19th century to the early part of the 20th century. However, the aftermath of the Pacific War did not favor the stable operation of the shrine as it couldn not function as a place for worshipping Inari from the political confusion. It was then taken over by Hinomoto Shinseikō as its headquarters. Despite taken over by a new religion that is not affiliated to Shrine Shinto, the Inari worship did not cease there. The Musashino Inari Shrine became a shrine registered under the Association of Shinto Shrines in 1968 with the support from Hinomoto Shinseikō. The current torii, currently demolished, and central hall (社殿, shaden) were newly constructed in the 1970s. It also additionally enshrines Tenjin from Kitano Tenmangū.

== Mound ==
Within the perimeter of the shrine, there is a mound called Hyōtan-zuka (瓢箪塚) or Wari-zuka (割塚) where the fallen of the Toshima clan's soldiers who were defeated by Ōta Dōkan, also called Shirogitsune-zuka (白狐塚) due to the shrine's myth of encountering mystic white foxes.
