= Takahashi Inari Shrine =

Shinto shrine in Kumamoto Prefecture, Japan

Takahashi Inari Shrine (高橋稲荷神社)
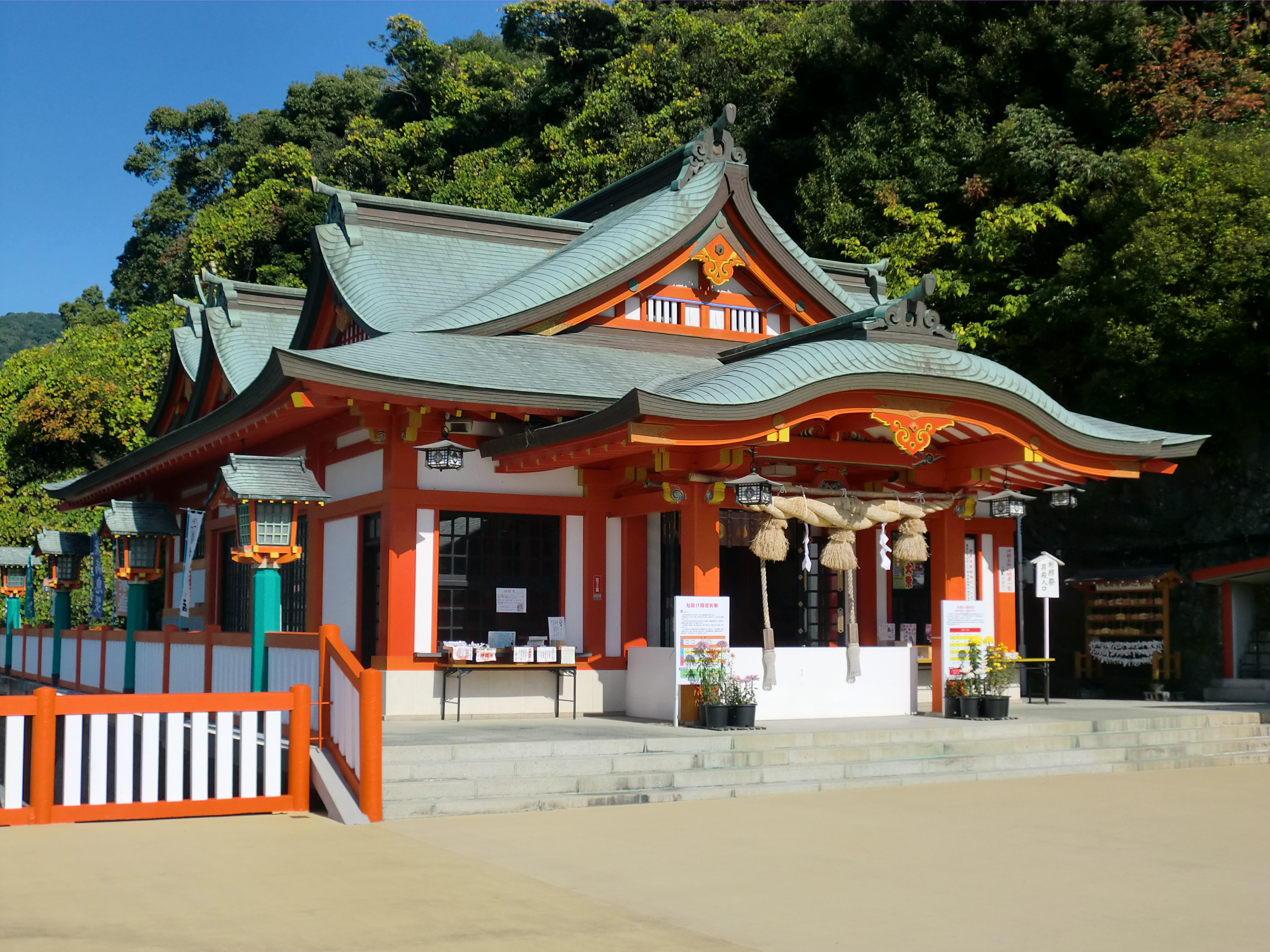
- Kumamoto Takahashi Inari Shrine

- Location within Japan

Religion
- Affiliation: Shinto

Location
- Location: Kumamoto, Kumamoto Prefecture
- Interactive map of Takahashi Inari Shrine (高橋稲荷神社)
- Coordinates: 32.7829°N 130.6586°E

Takahashi Inari Shrine (高橋稲荷神社, Takahashi inari jinja) is a Shinto Inari shrine, dedicated to the worship of the kami Inari. It is located in Kumamoto, Kumamoto Prefecture. Its main festival is held annually on November 8. It was founded in 1496.

== See also ==
- Inari shrine
