= Kasama ware =

Style of Japanese pottery

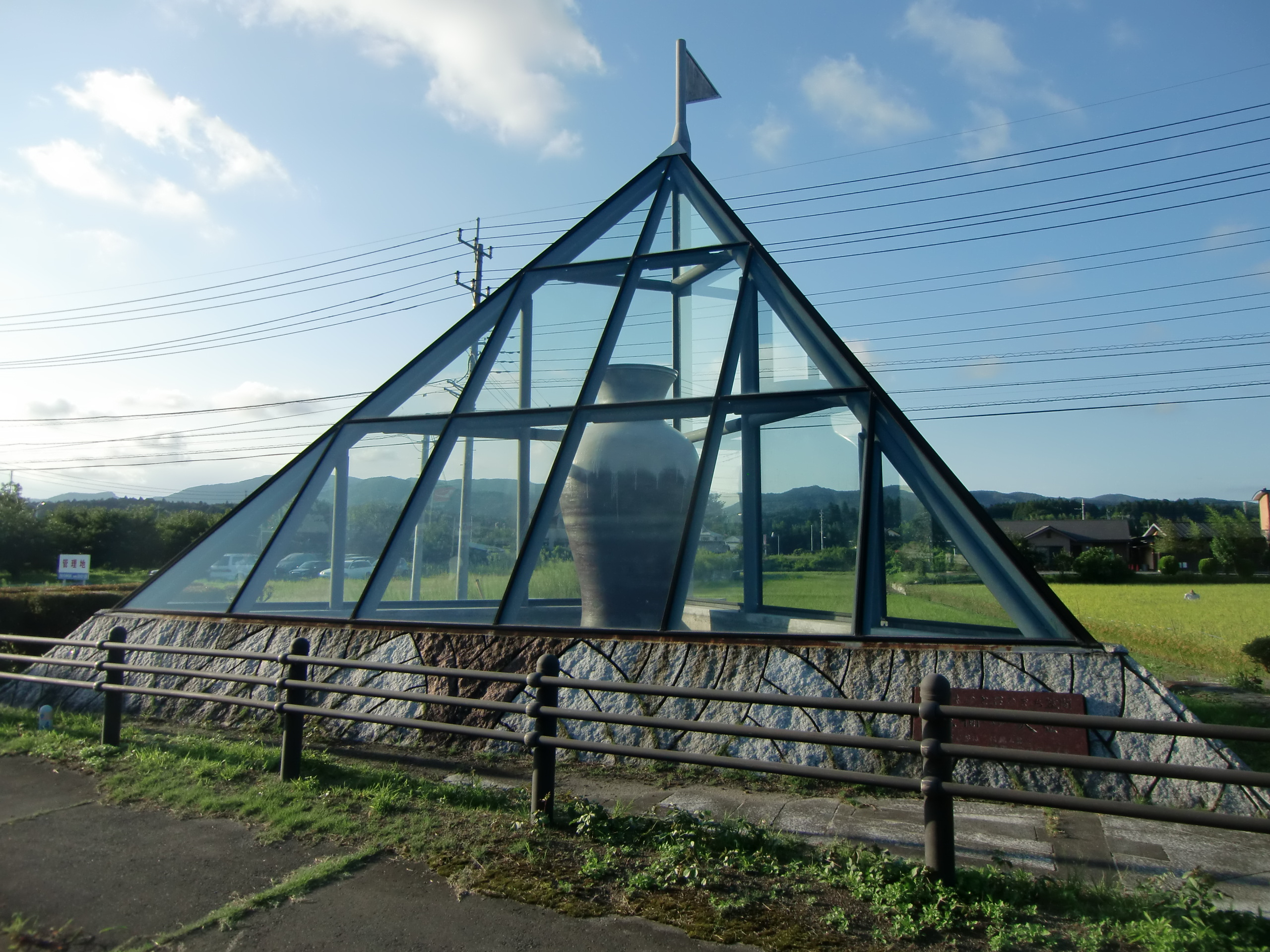
Kasama-yaki vase on display along Japan National Route 50 outside Kasama, Ibaraki

Kasama-ware (笠間焼, Kasama-yaki) is a style of Japanese pottery made in Kasama, Ibaraki, Ibaraki Prefecture, Japan.

== History ==
During the mid-Edo period, many potters from the Shigaraki area traveled the country to sell their wares or to simply find employment. During the An'ei period (1772–1784), the headman of Hakoda village in Hitachi Province, Kuno Hanzaemon Michinobe, invited a potter from Shiragaki named Chōzaemon to build a kiln in his village. The new kiln produced plain utilitarian pots and vessels, but soon received the patronage and protection of the daimyō of Kasama Domain, who controlled Hakoda village. This marked the beginning of the Kasama-yaki pottery style.

During the Meiji period, mass production techniques were introduced and Kasama grew to rival Mashiko as a leading pottery center for the Kantō region. After World War II, changes in local attitudes opened the Kasama-ware industry beyond its traditional restrictions on form and style, and also opened the door to any craftsmen, regardless of previous training or background. A similar transformation also occurred in nearby Mashiko. At present, more than 300 potters are active in Kasama, using various types of clay and glazes with no resemblance to the original Kasama-ware works of the Edo period.
