= Tamatsukuri Inari Shrine =

Shinto shrine in Osaka Prefecture, Japan

Tamatsukuri Inari Shrine (玉造稲荷神社, Tamatsukuri-Inari-jinja)
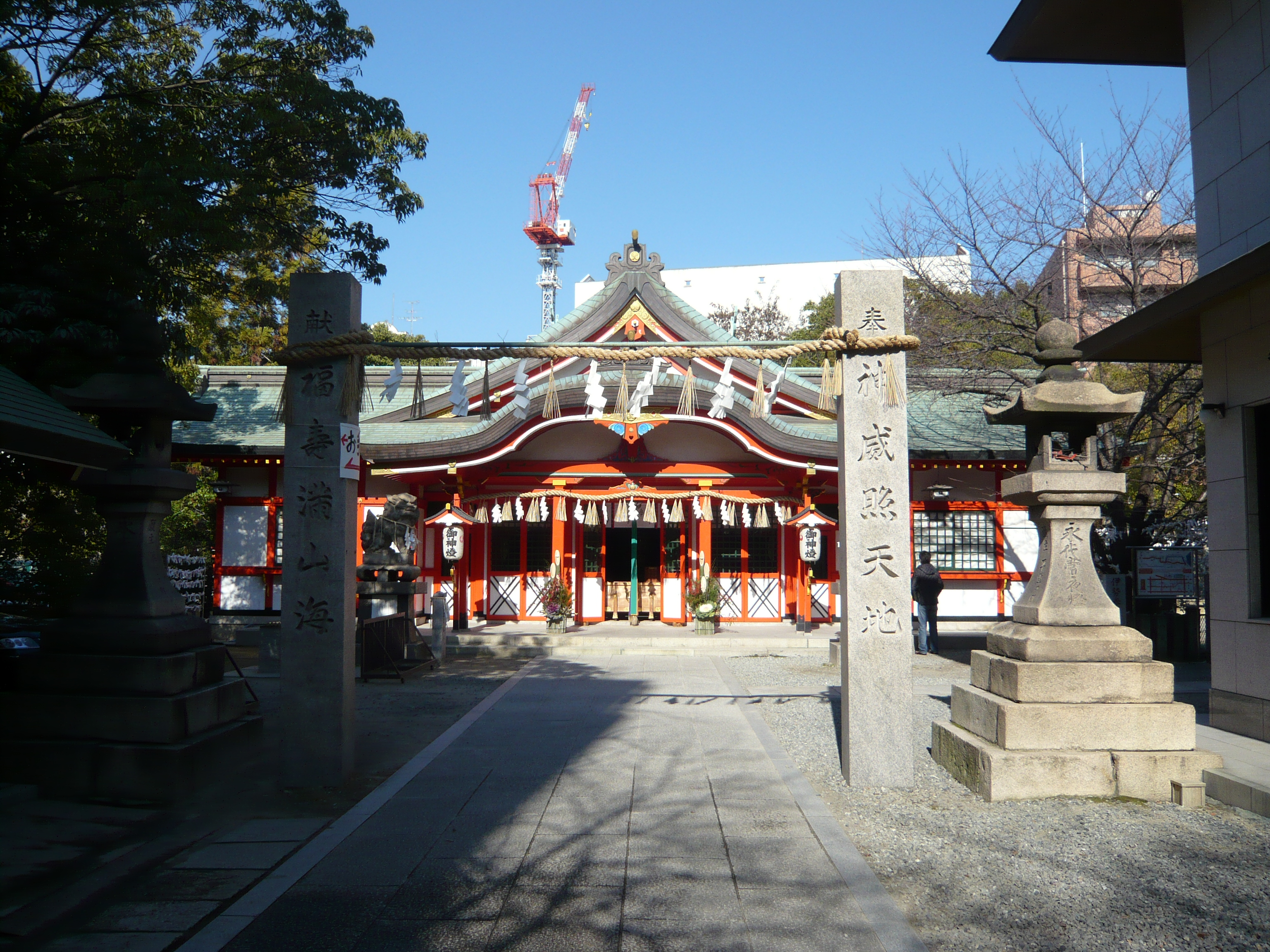
- Tamatsukuri Inari Shrine's haiden

- Location within Japan

Religion
- Affiliation: Shinto

Location
- Interactive map of Tamatsukuri Inari Shrine (玉造稲荷神社, Tamatsukuri-Inari-jinja)
- Coordinates: 34°40′41″N 135°31′48″E

Tamatsukuri Inari Shrine (玉造稲荷神社, Tamatsukuri-Inari-jinja) is a shrine dedicated to the Shinto kami ('god') Inari. Its construction can be traced to 12 BCE, and Inari was enshrined there by Toyotomi Hideyoshi in the 1580s to protect Osaka Castle.

== Location ==
The shrine is a short walk north from exit #1 of the Tamatsukuri Station on the Nagahori-tsurumi-ryokuchi Line of the Osaka subway system. It is close to the JR Loop Line.

The address is 2-3-8, Tamatsukuri, Chūō-ku, Osaka City, 540-0004.
