= List of national treasures of Japan (shrines) =

The number of Shinto shrines in Japan today has been estimated at more than 150,000. Single structure shrines are the most common. Shrine buildings might also include oratories (in front of main sanctuary), purification halls, offering halls called heiden (between honden and haiden), dance halls, stone or metal lanterns, fences or walls, torii and other structures. The term "national treasure" has been used in Japan to denote cultural properties since 1897. The definition and the criteria have changed since the inception of the term. The shrine structures in this list were designated national treasures when the Law for the Protection of Cultural Properties was implemented on June 9, 1951. As such they are eligible for government grants for repairs, maintenance and the installation of fire-prevention facilities and other disaster prevention systems. Owners are required to announce any changes to the national treasures such as damage or loss and need to obtain a permit for transfer of ownership or intended repairs. The items are selected by the Ministry of Education, Culture, Sports, Science and Technology based on their "especially high historical or artistic value". This list presents 43 (Note: The national treasure structures of Itsukushima Shrine are interconnected and registered as a single national treasure under one registration number. Only in the main treasure table of this article, the single entry is split in parts for readability.) (Note: The national treasure structures of Aoi Aso Shrine are registered as a single national treasure under one registration number. Only in the main treasure table of this article, the single entry is split in parts for readability.) entries of national treasure shrine structures from 12th-century Classical Heian period to the early modern 19th-century Edo period. The number of structures listed is actually more than 43, because in some cases groups of related structures are combined to form a single entry. The structures include main halls (honden), oratories (haiden), gates, offering halls (heiden), purification halls (haraedono) and other structures associated with shrines.

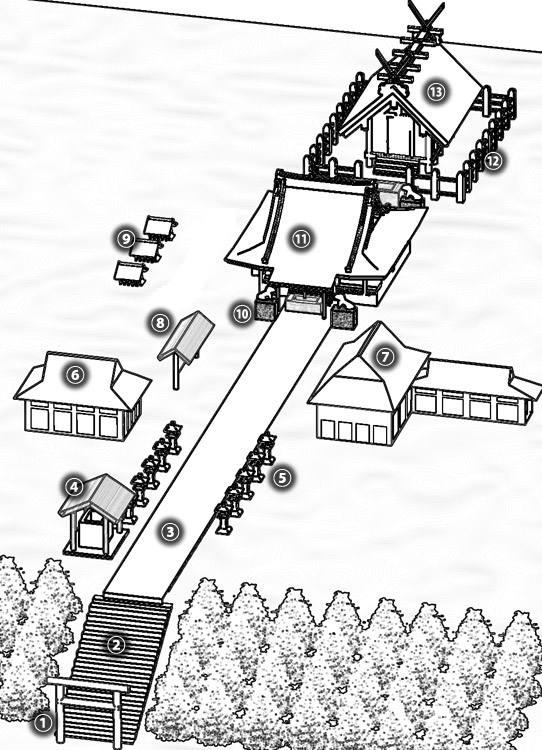
General layout of a Shinto shrine: 1. Torii, 2. Stone stairs, 3. Sandō, 4. Chōzuya or Temizuya, 5. Tōrō, 6. Kagura-den (building dedicated to Noh or the sacred Kagura dance), 7. Shamusho (administration office), 8. Ema, 9. Sessha/massha, 10. Komainu, 11. Haiden, 12. Tamagaki, 13. Honden

== History ==
The practice of marking sacred areas began in Japan as early as the Yayoi period (from about 500 BC to 300 AD) originating from primal religious beliefs. Features in the landscape such as rocks, waterfalls, islands, and especially mountains, were places believed to be capable of attracting kami, and subsequently were worshiped as yorishiro. Originally, sacred places may have been simply marked with a surrounding fence and an entrance gate or torii. Later, temporary structures similar to present day portable shrines were constructed to welcome the gods to the sacred place, which eventually evolved into permanent buildings that were dedicated to the gods. Ancient shrines were constructed according to the style of dwellings (Izumo Taisha) or storehouses (Ise Grand Shrine). The buildings had gabled roofs, raised floors, plank walls, and were thatched with reed or covered with hinoki cypress bark. Such early shrines did not include a space for worship. Three important forms of ancient shrine architectural styles exist: taisha-zukuri, (Note: (taisha-zukuri, 大社造): oldest style of shrine architecture resembling ancient dwellings. The honden is 2 ken×2 ken, raised above the ground and has a veranda and roofed stairs leading directly to the entrance on the gable side. They are decorated with forked finials (chigi).) shinmei-zukuri (Note: (shinmei-zukuri, 神明造): ancient style of Shinto shrine architecture consisting of a small structure, that is either 3 ken×2 ken or 1 ken×1 ken, raised several steps above ground level surrounded by a railed veranda. Generally it has a simple gable roof with forked finials called chigi. The entrance is on a side parallel to the ridge.) and sumiyoshi-zukuri. (Note: (sumiyoshi-zukuri, 住吉造): ancient style of Shinto shrine honden consisting of a 4 ken×2 ken structure with a front and rear room. It has a straight gable roof with overhanging eaves and an entrance on the front gable side.) They are exemplified by Izumo Taisha, Nishina Shinmei Shrine and Sumiyoshi Taisha, respectively, and date from before 552 AD. According to the tradition of Shikinen sengū-sai (式年遷宮祭), the buildings or shrines were faithfully rebuilt at regular intervals adhering to the original design. In this manner, ancient styles have been replicated through the centuries to the present day. (Note: Presently only the Ise Grand Shrine is rebuilt every 20 years.)

Beginning in the mid-6th century, as Buddhism was brought to Japan from Baekje, new styles of shrine architecture were introduced; today's Shinto shrine blueprint is of Buddhist origin. The concept of temples as a place of assembly was applied to shrines. Spaces for worship were added in the form of extended roofs or worship halls (haiden) in addition to the main hall (honden). The following stylistic elements of Buddhist temple architecture were assimilated and applied to Japanese shrines: column-base stones, (Note: Before wooden columns were placed directly in the ground.) brackets, curved roofs, painted surfaces, metal ornaments, corridors and pagodas. At the end of the 8th century as architectural styles evolved, new elements were added as is evident in kasuga-zukuri (Note: (kasuga-zukuri, 春日造): a shrine style resembling that of Kasuga Taisha with (generally) a small 1 ken×1 ken honden. The roof is gabled and has an attached pent roof covering the entrance stairway which is located on the gable side. This is, next to the nagare-zukuri, the second most common style of shrine architecture.) (Kasuga Shrine and Hakusandō/Kasugadō at Enjō-ji), the flowing roof or nagare-zukuri (Note: (nagare-zukuri, 流造): gable roof with a slightly curved short rear roof and a long deeply curved front roof covering both the step-canopy and pent roof over the veranda and steps. The entrance is on the long side, the side parallel to the ridge. The building's width is between one and eleven ken. This is the most common style of shrine architecture.) (Shimogamo Shrine), hachiman-zukuri (Note: (hachiman-zukuri, 八幡造): a style of shrine architecture characterised by a structure which appears from the side as two separate buildings with their gabled roofs joined by a rain gutter. The space between the buildings is enclosed and 1 ken wide. The entrances are in the center of each building on the side parallel to the ridges. The front structure is the outer sanctuary (外殿, gai-den), that at the rear the inner sanctuary (内殿, nai-den). Together they form the main hall (honden).) (Usa Shrine) and hiyoshi-zukuri (Note: (hiyoshi-zukuri or hie-zukuri, 日吉造): a style unique to the main buildings of Hiyoshi Taisha. From the front, the building appears like a 5 ken wide structure with hip-and-gable irimoya style roof and an entrance from the central step canopy. From the side, the eave appears shorn off midway giving the rear roof a trapezoidal form. The core of the building is 3 ken×2 ken to which 1 ken wide aisles are added on three sides making it a 5 ken×3 ken structure.) (Hiyoshi Taisha). The nagare-zukuri continues to be the more popular style, followed by the kasuga-zukuri. The honden of Ujigami Shrine dates to this period. At the end of the Heian period torii and fences were commonly replaced with two-storied gates and grand colonnades copied from temple architecture. The influence of the residential shinden-zukuri style of palaces and mansions is apparent in shrines such as Itsukushima Shrine.

The auxiliary Marōdo Shrine at Itsukushima Shrine originates from the 13th-century Kamakura period, and the honden and haiden of the Kibitsu Shrine date from the 15th-century Muromachi period. In the late 16th century and early 17th century, during the Momoyama period, gongen-zukuri was introduced as a new plan of building shrines. The main hall was joined to the oratory via a connecting structure called the ai-no-ma, derived from the hachiman-zukuri style. Examples of gongen-zukuri are the honden at Kitano Tenman-gū and Ōsaki Hachiman Shrine. Tōshō-gū dates from the Edo period and was completed in 1636. It is a complex assembly of richly adorned shrines, temples and a mausoleum. Such complexes are a result of the syncretism of Shinto and Buddhism which began to appear during the Heian period; Kitano Tenman-gū, built in 947 for the spirit of Sugawara no Michizane, was the first of these byō or jingū-ji.

== Statistics ==
The 43 entries in the list consist of the following: main halls (honden), combined structures of honden, haiden with or without an ai-no-ma or heiden in between, oratories (haiden), offering halls (heiden), corridors, gates, fences, purification halls and other halls that are related to a shrine.

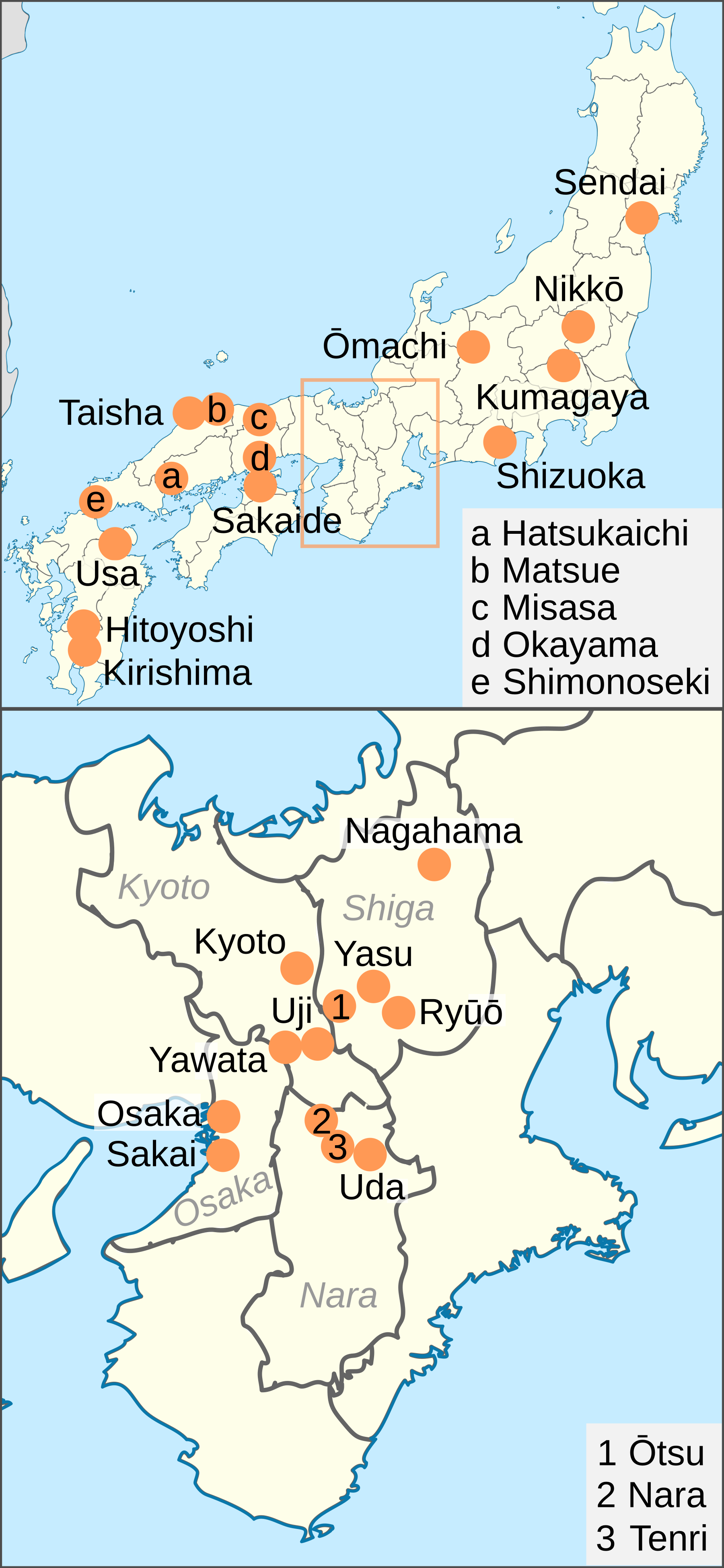
Map showing the location of shrine national treasures in Japan

Prefecture	City	National treasures
Hiroshima	Hatsukaichi	1
Kagawa	Sakaide	1
Kagoshima	Kirishima	1
Kumamoto	Hitoyoshi	1
Kyoto	Kyoto	6
Kyoto	Uji	2
Kyoto	Yawata	1
Miyagi	Sendai	1
Nagano	Ōmachi	1
Nara	Nara	2
Nara	Tenri	2
Nara	Uda	1
Okayama	Okayama	1
Ōita	Usa	1
Osaka	Osaka	1
Osaka	Sakai	1
Saitama	Kumagaya	1
Shiga	Nagahama	1
Shiga	Ryūō	1
Shiga	Yasu	2
Shiga	Ōtsu	3
Shimane	Matsue	1
Shimane	Taisha	1
Shizuoka	Shizuoka	1
Tochigi	Nikkō	6
Tottori	Misasa	1
Yamaguchi	Shimonoseki	1

Period (Note: If a national treasure was constructed during more than one period, only the oldest period is counted.)	National treasures
Heian period	2
Kamakura period	10
Muromachi period	5
Momoyama period	8
Edo period	18

== Usage ==
The table's columns (except for Remarks and Images) are sortable pressing the arrow symbols.

- Name: name of the structure as registered in the Database of National Cultural Properties
- Shrine: name of the shrine in which the structure is located
- Remarks: architecture and general remarks including

- size measured in ken, or distance between pillars; "m×n" denotes the length (m) and width (n) of the structure, each measured in ken
- architectural style (zukuri) and type of roofing
- existence of bargeboards, forked roof finials (chigi), step canopies, etc

- Date: period and year of the last major reconstruction; The column entries sort by year. If only a period is known, they sort by the start year of that period.
- Location: "town-name prefecture-name"; The column entries sort as "prefecture-name town-name".
- Images: picture of the structure; If the image shows more than one structure, the respective structure is indicated by a blue rectangle.

== Treasures ==
Name	Shrine	Remarks	Date	Location	Image
Ōsaki Hachimangū (大崎八幡宮, Ōsaki Hachiman-gū) (Note: One munafuda (棟札) ridge tag with information on the building's construction is attached to the nomination.)	Ōsaki Hachimangū	Honden: 5×3, single-storied, irimoya style (Note: (irimoya-zukuri, 入母屋造): a hip-and-gable roof combining a ridge and two gable pediments on the upper part with a hipped roof on all sides in the lower part of the roof.) with shake shingles; Ishi-no-ma (石の間): 1×1, single-storied, ryōsage style (Note: (ryōsage-zukuri, 両下造): a gable roof without gable pediments because other structures connect to it.) with shake shingles; Haiden: 5×3 (7 ken along the front facade), single-storied, irimoya style, front with a chidori hafu bargeboard (Note: (chidori hafu, 千鳥破風, lit. "plover gable"): a decorative dormer bargeboard on triangular shaped dormers with strong concave curves.) and a 5 ken step canopy with a nokikarahafu gable, (Note: (nokikarahafu, 軒唐破風): an undulating Karahafu gable at eave ends.) shake shingles. Oldest existing gongen style (Note: (gongen-zukuri, 権現造): a complex style where the honden is joined with the haiden through a low intermediate roofed passageway called ai-no-ma (相の間), ishi-no-ma (石の間) or chūden (中殿).) complex	Azuchi-Momoyama period, 1607	Sendai, Miyagi 38°16′21″N 140°50′42″E	Wooden building with a large roof and central gable on the front. Both the roof and the lower part are in very dark colors. Three ropes are hanging down from the front centre gable.
Main Hall (本殿, honden), Room of Stone (石の間, ishi no ma) and Oratory (拝殿, haiden) (Note: The following items are attached to the nomination: bell house (鐘舎, shōsha), tōdaihoya (燈台穂屋) hut, sacred copper-plated storehouse (銅神庫, dōjinko), connection corridor (渡廊, watarō), gate of copper warehouse (銅庫門, dōko-mon), God's rest room (西浄, saijō), two iron fire baskets for lanterns (鉄燈籠), nine copper boxes with implements for the memorial service of the dead (銅箱入供養具), two side entrances (妻戸, tsumado), east passage gate (東通用御門, higashi tsuyōgō-mon) or 社家門 (shake-mon), 104 stone lanterns (石燈籠, ishitōrō), the road approaching the shrine (参道, sandō), emergency gate (非常門, hijō-mon); guard house (内番所, uchibansho); 16 copper fire baskets for lanterns (銅燈籠); one box of carpenter implements (箱入大工道具); one lamp stand (燈台); a stone fence, a torii.)	Tōshō-gū	Honden: 5×5, irimoya style with a 1 ken step canopy on the back side; ishi-no-ma (石の間): 3×1, ryōsage style; Haiden: 9×4 (7 ken along the front facade), irimoya style, front with a chidori hafu bargeboard and a 3 ken step canopy with a nokikarahafu gable. All three structures are single-storied and have copper-tile roofing.	early Edo period, 1636	Nikkō, Tochigi 36°45′29″N 139°35′55″E	A building with gabled tiled roof behind a see-through fence with a Chinese style gate.
Yōmeimon (陽明門) (Note: Two former ceiling boards are attached to the nomination.)	Tōshō-gū	3×2, two-storied sangen-ikko (三間一戸) gate in irimoya style with nokikarahafu gables in every direction, copper-tile roofing, more than 500 carvings of historical anecdotes, children at play, wise men and others, connected to the Tōzai Kairō on either side	early Edo period, 1636	Nikkō, Tochigi 36°45′28″N 139°35′55″E	A two-storied, decorated wooden gate where the upper story extends over the lower. There is a bulging gable at the center under which a board with characters is attached.
Tōzai Kairō (東西廻廊)	Tōshō-gū	36 and 54 ken long semi-enclosed corridors with colored carvings of flowers and bird in fretwork technique, extending to either side of the Yōmeimon gate, irimoya style with copper-tile roofing	early Edo period, 1636	Nikkō, Tochigi 36°45′28″N 139°35′56″E	Wooden wall with red beams and colored carvings of plants, peacocks and other birds.
Karamon (唐門) (front and back)	Tōshō-gū	1×1, Chinese style gate decorated with white carvings, single-storied, with a karahafu style (Note: (karahafu, 唐破風): an undulating bargeboard flowing downwards from the top center with convex curves on each side that change to concave curves which either level off or turn upward at the ends.) roof with copper-tile roofing, connected to the Tōzai Sukibei fence on either side	early Edo period, 1636	Nikkō, Tochigi 36°45′29″N 139°35′55″E	A Chinese style connected on either side to a see-through fence. White carved figures under an undulating gable.
Tōzai Sukibei (東西透塀)	Tōshō-gū	43 and 44 ken long see-through fences extending to the east and west from the karamon, copper-tile roofing	early Edo period, 1636	Nikkō, Tochigi 36°45′29″N 139°35′55″E	A roofed colorful fence extending to either side of a Chinese style gate
Main Hall (本殿, honden), Middle Room (相の間, ai no ma), Oratory (拝殿, haiden) (Note: The following items are attached to the nomination: road from the Deva gate to the shrine, 66 copper fire baskets for lanterns, 249 stone lanterns, a stone fence, one miniature shrine, nine copper boxes with implements for the memorial service of the dead, one munafuda (棟札) ridge tag with information on the building's construction.)	Taiyuin Mausoleum (大猷院霊廟, taiyū-in reibyō) (Rinnō-ji)	Honden: 3×3, irimoya style with a pent roof enclosure (Note: (mokoshi, 裳階): a pent roof enclosure, generally one ken deep.); Ishi-no-ma (石の間): 3×1, ryōsage style; Haiden: 7×3, irimoya style, front with a chidori hafu bargeboard and a 3 ken step canopy with a nokikarahafu gable. All three structures are single-storied and have copper-tile roofing. The shrine is the mausoleum of the third Tokugawa shōgun Tokugawa Iemitsu.	early Edo period, 1653	Nikkō, Tochigi 36°45′28″N 139°35′39″E	Wooden building connected to a lower building. Both are colored in black and have gilt metal decorations. There is a veranda with red handrail on both buildings. A black wooden building with gilt decorations and a veranda with a red handrail.
Main Hall (本殿, honden) and inner gate (中門, chūmon)	Nishina Shinmei Shrine	Honden: 3×2, oldest extant example of the shinmei style; Inner gate: four-legged gate (Note: (shikyakumon, 四脚門): a single-storied gate with two main pillars in line with the ridge of the roof and a pair of supporting square posts ("legs") on either side. Generally with a gabled roof.) connected to the honden, with a kirizuma style (Note: (kirizuma-zukuri, 切妻造): a gabled roof with equal lengths from the ridge to the eaves.) roof Both structures ar covered with hinoki cypress bark shingles.	middle Edo period, 1630 (inner gate) and 1636 (main hall)	Ōmachi, Nagano 36°27′00″N 137°52′44″E	A simple wooden building with a railed veranda horizontal logs on the roof ridge and forked finials. From the front another roof runs over the steps to the veranda and connects to another building.
Shōden Hall (聖天堂, shōden-dō)	Kangi-in	Okuden (奥殿): 3×3, irimoya style with nokikarahafu gables on the sides, nokikarahafu and chidori hafu gables at the back, 1 ken step canopy; Chūden (中殿): 3×1, ryōsage style; Haiden: 5×3, irimoya style, front with a chidori hafu bargeboard and a 3 ken step canopy with a nokikarahafu gable. All three structures are single storied and have copper-tile roofing. They form a gongen style complex.	mid Edo period, 1744 (Okuden), 1756 (Haiden), 1760 (Chūden)	Kumagaya, Saitama 36°13′41″N 139°22′29″E	A wooden building with a hip and gable style roof.
Main Hall (本殿, honden), Room of Stone (石の間, ishi no ma) and Oratory (拝殿, haiden) (Note: The following items are attached to the nomination: a set of eleven implements for the Anchin-hō ceremony of Esoteric Buddhism; road approaching the shrine; two copper lanterns; a stone font for ritual cleansing; one munafuda (棟札) ridge tag with information on the building's construction; six two hanging lanterns)	Kunōzan Tōshō-gū	Honden: 3×3, irimoya style; ishi-no-ma (石の間): 1×1, ryōsage style; Haiden: 5×2, irimoya style, front with a chidori hafu bargeboard and a 3 ken step canopy. All three structures are single-storied and have copper-tile roofing. Original burial place of the first Shōgun of the Tokugawa Shogunate, Tokugawa Ieyasu and therefore the oldest of the Tōshō-gū shrines	Edo period, 1617	Shizuoka, Shizuoka 34°57′53″N 138°28′03″E	
Shinra Zenjin Hall (新羅善神堂, shinra zenjindō) (Note: The nomination includes a dais and a miniature shrine.)	Mii-dera	3×3, single-storied, flowing roof style with a 1 ken step canopy, covered with hinoki cypress bark shingles. The structure houses the national treasure Shinra Myōjin Zazō (新羅明神坐像), a sculpture of the deity that protects Mii-dera, Shinra Myōjin.	early Muromachi period, 1347	Ōtsu, Shiga 35°01′10″N 135°51′10″E	Wooden building with an asymmetric gabled roof and a raised veranda with handrail.
Main Hall (本殿, honden) (Note: Attached to the nomination is one miniature shrine.)	Mikami Shrine	3×3, single-storied, irimoya style roof with a 1 ken step canopy covered by hinoki cypress bark shingles	late Kamakura period	Yasu, Shiga 35°03′00″N 136°1′39″E	A small wooden building with a roofed, raised veranda with a handrail
Main Hall (本殿, honden) (Note: Eleven munafuda (棟札) ridge tags with information on the building's construction are attached to the nomination.)	Ōsasahara Shrine	3×3, single-storied, irimoya style roof with a 1 ken step canopy covered by hinoki cypress bark shingles. Notably excellent technique for the construction, transom and doors	middle Muromachi period, 1414	Yasu, Shiga 35°04′35″N 136°03′57″E	A small wooden building with a roofed, raised veranda with a handrail
Main Hall (本殿, honden)	Tsukubusuma Shrine	3×3, single-storied, irimoya style with nokikarahafu gables at the front and back side, surrounding eaves and step canopy are 1 ken, 60 decorative ceiling paintings of flowers in gold paint by Kanō Mitsunobu	Azuchi-Momoyama period, 1567 (step canopy and eaves) and 1602 (main building)	Nagahama, Shiga 35°25′15″N 136°8′39″E	Building at the top of a flight of modern stairs with undulating Chinese style gable at the front. The lower part is covered by a red cloth which is hung from the eaves of the roof.
West Hall of Worship (西本宮, nishi hon-gū), Main Hall (本殿, honden)	Hiyoshi Taisha	5×3, hiyoshi style, hinoki cypress bark shingles	Azuchi-Momoyama period, 1586	Ōtsu, Shiga 35°04′18″N 135°51′44″E	Three-quarter view of a proportionally tall wooden building with a veranda with red hand rail and a canopy covering the steps that lead to the central entrance. The roof appears to be a hip-and-gable roof. Three-quarter view of a proportionally tall wooden building with a veranda with red hand rail. The corner of the eaves appear cut off.
East Hall of Worship (東本宮, higashi hon-gū), Main Hall (本殿, honden)	Hiyoshi Taisha	5×3, hiyoshi style, hinoki cypress bark shingles	Azuchi-Momoyama period, 1595	Ōtsu, Shiga 35°04′24″N 135°51′54″E	Three-quarter view of a proportionally tall wooden building with a veranda with red hand rail and a canopy covering the steps that lead to the central entrance. The roof appears to be a hip-and-gable roof. Three-quarter view of a proportionally tall wooden building with a veranda with red hand rail. The veranda is higher at the center of the back side of the building. The corner of the eaves appear cut off.
West Main Hall (西本殿, nishi honden) (Note: One munafuda (棟札) ridge tag with information on the building's construction and one miniature shrine are attached to the nomination.)	Namura Shrine	3 ken wide, flowing roof style with a 1 ken step canopy and hinoki cypress bark shingles	late Kamakura period, 1308	Ryūō, Shiga 35°3′55″N 136°7′41″E	A complex of wooden buildings behind a wooden roofed fence.
Main Hall (本殿, honden)	Ujigami Shrine	5×3, single-storied, flowing roof style with hinoki cypress bark shingles. The building consists of three single-ken shrines arranged side by side under the same roof. It is part of the World Heritage Site Historic Monuments of Ancient Kyoto (Kyoto, Uji and Otsu Cities) and the oldest extant main shrine building (honden).	late Heian period, 1060	Uji, Kyoto 34°53′31″N 135°48′41″E	A rather wide building with wooden beams and white painted walls. The front wall is completely covered by wooden grill windows.
Oratory (拝殿, haiden) (Note: One frog leg strut (蟇股) and four sangarado (桟唐戸), panelled entrance doors, are attached to the nomination.)	Ujigami Shrine	6×3, single-storied, kirizuma style roof with a 1 ken step canopy and hinoki cypress bark shingles. The haiden is believed to have been originally constructed in the residential shinden-zukuri style. It is part of the World Heritage Site Historic Monuments of Ancient Kyoto (Kyoto, Uji and Otsu Cities).	early Kamakura period	Uji, Kyoto 34°53′31″N 135°48′41″E	Frontal view of a rather low and wide building with wooden beams and white painted walls.
Iwashimizu Hachimangū main shrine 10 buildings (石清水八幡宮本社10棟, iwashimizu hachimangū honsha jūtō)	Iwashimizu Hachimangū	Honden: 11 ken wide, hachiman style, consisting of naiden (内殿) in kirizuma style and geden (外殿) in flowing roof style,; Sessha Takeuchi Shrine Honden: kirizuma style, behind the main Honden in the north-west; Mizugaki; Heiden with Buden: offering hall and hall for bugaku and kagura dance, kirizuma style; Rōmon; East Gate (Higashi-mon): kirizuma style; West Gate (Nishi-mon): kirizuma style; Kairō (3 parts): irimoya style,. all structures with hinoki cypress bark shingles except for the Kairō, the east and west gates which have hongawarabuki roofing. (Note: (hongawarabuki, 本瓦葺): a tile roof composed of flat broad concave tiles and semi-cylindrical convex tiles covering the seams of the former.)	early Edo period, 1634	Yawata, Kyoto 34°52′47″N 135°42′00″E	Frontal view of low roofed structure with a central gable and a prominent tall tower hovering above.
East Main Hall (東本殿, higashi honden) and West Main Hall (西本殿, nishi honden) (Note: A total of eight subordinate shrine honden and a see-through fence are attached to the nomination.)	Kamomioya Shrine or Shimogamo Shrine	either hall: 3 ken wide flowing roof style, hinoki cypress bark shingles. founded before the Heian capital, present buildings from 17th century. They are part of the World Heritage Site Historic Monuments of Ancient Kyoto (Kyoto, Uji and Otsu Cities).	end of Edo period, 1863	Kyoto35°02′21″N 135°46′23″E	A door, stairs and veranda of a wooden building with metal ornaments. A grey and blue lion figure is placed on the veranda.
Main Hall (本殿, honden) and Associate Hall (権殿, gonden)	Kamowakeikazuchi Shrine or Kamigamo Shrine	Both structures are identical in size and shape: 3×2, 5.9 m × 7.2 m (19 ft × 24 ft) flowing roof style with an extended roof in front to cover a prayer portico, hinoki cypress bark shingles. Honden and gonden were used alternatingly whenever one of them was being reconstructed or under repair. They are part of the World Heritage Site Historic Monuments of Ancient Kyoto (Kyoto, Uji and Otsu Cities).	end of Edo period, 1863	Kyoto 35°03′38″N 135°45′10″E	—
Oratory (拝殿, haiden)	Seiryōgū (清瀧宮) (Daigo-ji, upper Daigo (上醍醐))	7×3, overhang style (懸造, kake-zukuri), single-storied, irimoya style, entrance in the gable ends, 3 ken step canopy and nokikarahafu gable. It is part of the World Heritage Site Historic Monuments of Ancient Kyoto (Kyoto, Uji and Otsu Cities).	middle Muromachi period, 1434	Kyoto 34°56′44″N 135°50′17″E	Frontal view of a wooden building with white walls and undulating gable in line with the eaves and below a normal gable.
Karamon (唐門)	Toyokuni Shrine	four-legged gate gate with Karahafu gables at the front and back, irimoya style roof on the sides, covered with hinoki cypress bark shingles	Azuchi-Momoyama period, ca. 1598	Kyoto 34°59′30″N 135°46′19″E	Frontal view of a black wooden gate with a large dominating roof with an undulating gable and golden metal decorations.
Main Hall (本殿, honden), Room of Stone (石の間, ishi no ma), Oratory (拝殿, haiden) and Music Chamber (楽の間, gaku no ma) (Note: Six munafuda (棟札) ridge tags with information on the building's construction are attached to the nomination.)	Kitano Tenman-gū	Honden: 5×4, irimoya style with a 3 ken aisle on the right side, covered with hinoki cypress bark shingles Room of Stone: 3×1, ryōsage style, covered with hinoki cypress bark Haiden: 7×3, irimoya style with a chidori hafu bargeboard on the front and a 7 ken step canopy Music Chamber: length 2 ken at the front, 3 ken at the back, width: 2 ken, irimoya style on one end, connected to the haiden, covered with hinoki cypress bark shingles All four structures are single-storied. This is the oldest extant gongen style complex. It was founded in the 10th century.	Azuchi-Momoyama period, 1607	Kyoto 35°01′53″N 135°44′06″E	honden haiden gaku-no-ma
Main Hall (本殿, honden)	Yasaka Shrine	Honden: 7×6, gion style, (Note: (gion-zukuri, 祇園造) or (yasaka-zukuri, 八坂造): a complicated floor plan consisting of a 5×2 core (moya) surrounded by a 1 bay deep hisashi and other aisles added. It also includes an oratory (haiden) perhaps reflecting the strong influence of esoteric Buddhism on Shrine architecture.) irimoya style with hinoki cypress bark roofing	early Edo period, 1654	Kyoto 35°00′13″N 135°46′43″E	honden
Oratory (拝殿, haiden)	Sakurai Shrine	5×3, single-storied, kirizuma style with a hongawarabuki roof (except for the rear step canopy)	late Kamakura period	Sakai, Osaka 34°29′07″N 135°30′23″E	A building with red and white walls and a tile roof.
Main Hall (本殿, honden) (Note: A mizugaki (瑞垣) fence with vertically set boards and a gate are included in the nomination.)	Sumiyoshi Taisha	4×2, oldest example of the sumiyoshi style covered by hinoki cypress bark shingles. The shrine consists of four identical structures (positioned in "L"-shape), each 4.8 m × 8 m (16 ft × 26 ft).	late Edo period, 1810	Osaka 34°36′45″N 135°29′35″E	Front and side view and plan of a building with two rooms, forked roof finials, a door on the gable end to which a small stair leads and a fence which surrounds the building on three sides.
Main Hall (本殿, honden)	Uda Mikumari Shrine	three 1×1 kasuga style buildings with added hip rafter, covered with hinoki cypress bark shingles	late Kamakura period, 1320	Uda, Nara 34°28′29″N 135°58′15″E	A vermillion red building with three identical curved gables and forked finials on the roof.
Main Hall (本殿, honden) (Note: The nomination includes a see-through fence, torii and a mizugaki (瑞垣) fence with vertically set boards.)	Kasuga Shrine	consists of four 1×1 shrine buildings 1.83 m × 2.64 m (6.0 ft × 8.7 ft) in kasuga style aligned in east–west direction on a grid frame, covered with hinoki cypress bark shingles; founded around mid 8th century, present form from beginning of Heian period, regularly demolished and reconstructed at 20-year intervals until 1863. It is part of the World Heritage Site Historic Monuments of Ancient Nara.	late Edo period, 1863	Nara, Nara 34°40′54″N 135°50′55″E	Building with white walls, red wooden beams and forked finials on the roof located behind a fence with gate.
Oratory (拝殿, haiden) (Note: Six munafuda (棟札) ridge tags with information on the building's construction are attached to the nomination.)	Isonokami Shrine	7×4, single-storied, irimoya style with a 1 ken step canopy, hinoki cypress bark shingles	early Kamakura period	Tenri, Nara; 34°35′52.13″N 135°51′7.17″E	Wooden building with raised floor, vermillion red beams and railed open veranda.
Oratory (拝殿, haiden)	Sessha Izumo Takeo Shrine (摂社出雲建雄神社, sessha izumo takeo jinja) (Isonokami Shrine)	5×1, single-storied, kirizuma style, central passage with a karahafu gable, hinoki cypress bark shingles	late Kamakura period, 1300	Tenri, Nara 34°35′51″N 135°51′07″E	A wide wooden building with a passageway over which there is a Chinese style gable.
Hakusan-dō (白山堂) and Kasuga-dō (春日堂)	Enjō-ji	two identical structures, each: 1×1, kasuga style with hinoki cypress bark shingles, together these are the oldest extant structures in the kasuga style	early Kamakura period, Antei era, 1227–1229	Nara, Nara 34°41′45″N 135°54′56″E	A small wooden building next to another identical building with gabled roof, a stair on the gable side covered by an extended roof. The roof ridge has forked finials.
Nageiri Hall (投入堂, nageiridō) (Note: The Aizen-dō (愛染堂) hall, 43 pieces of ancient lumber and one munafuda (棟札) ridge tag with information on the building's construction are attached to the nomination.)	Okuno-in (奥院) (Sanbutsu-ji)	1×2, single-storied, overhang style (懸造, kake-zukuri) with a flowing roof covered with hinoki cypress bark shingles	late Heian period	Misasa, Tottori 35°23′48″N 133°57′34″E	A wooden structure on a cliff face supported by long wooden poles.
Main Hall (本殿, honden) (Note: The nomination includes the inner shrine (内殿) and one munafuda (棟札) ridge tag with information on the building's construction.)	Izumo Taisha	2×2, taisha style with hinoki cypress bark shingles; 10.9 m × 10.9 m (36 ft × 36 ft) and 24 m (79 ft) high (originally 48 m (157 ft)), slightly curved roof, three ridge billets, believed to have been the house of Ōkuninushi	middle Edo period, 1744	Taisha, Shimane 35°24′07″N 132°41′07″E	A large wooden building with gabled roof and forked roof finials located beyond other buildings. A small building with raised floor and gabled roof with forked roof finials. A roofed staircase leads to the building on the gable side.
Main Hall (本殿, honden) (Note: The nomination includes an inner shrine and an ancient pillar called shin no mihashira (心御柱).)	Kamosu Shrine	2×2, taisha style with tochibuki board roofing (Note: (tochibuki, 栩葺): type of board roofing whereby circa 1–3 cm (0.39–1.18 in) thick and 60 cm (24 in) long boards are split and laid down with considerable overlap.)	Azuchi-Momoyama period, 1583	Matsue, Shimane 35°25′32″N 133°05′03″E	A small wooden building with a veranda and gabled roof raised high above ground. A roofed staircase leads to the gable side of the building.
Main Hall (本殿, honden) and Oratory (拝殿, haiden) (Note: The nomination includes two munafuda (棟札) ridge tags with information on the building's construction.)	Kibitsu Shrine	Honden: 5 ken long (7 on the back), 8 ken wide, hiyoku irimoya style (Note: (hiyoku irimoya-zukuri, 比翼入母屋造): a hip-and-gable roof exemplified by the one of Kibitsu Shrine with the main ridges of the roof parallel to the long side of the honden and ridges perpendicular to the main ridge creating two gables on each side of the ridge.); Haiden: 3×1, kirizuma style, connected to the rear of the honden roof, pent roof on three sides covered with hongawarabuki roofing Both structures are single-storied and covered with hinoki cypress bark shingles. At 14.5 m × 17.9 m (48 ft × 59 ft), the largest shrine structure in Japan	middle Muromachi period, 1425	Okayama 34°40′14.62″N 133°51′02″E	A large wooden building with two small gabled roofs put on top of the main roof and across the main ridge. There are forked roof finials on the top.
main shrine: Main Hall (本殿, honden), Oratory (拝殿, haiden), Offering Hall (幣殿, heiden) (Note: The nomination includes the fence around the shrine and the left and right Naishi-bashi (内待橋), which are the bridges passed by women serving at the court (naishi) on their way to offer food for the gods.)	Itsukushima Shrine	Honden: 8×4 (9 ken wide at back), ryōnagare style (Note: (ryōnagare-zukuri, 両流造): a style of honden architecture characterised by a gable roof with a long curved flowing roof line on both sides unlike the nagare style which has a short curved roof on the back and a long curved roof on the front.) Heiden: 1×1, ryōsage style Haiden: 10×3, irimoya style with gables clinging to either end All three structures are connected via the heiden, single-storied and have hinoki cypress bark roofing. The shrine is a World Heritage Site.	early Kamakura period and late Muromachi period, 1241 (Heiden and Haiden), 1571 (Honden)	Hatsukaichi, Hiroshima 34°17′45″N 132°19′12″E	A building with a gabled roof, white walls and vermillion red wooden beams located above water next to other buildings and catwalks. View through a hall (Haiden) with vermillion red beams and hanging lanterns to a space with standing lanterns beyond which there is another building with an altar.
main shrine: Purification Hall (祓殿, haraedono) (Note: The nomination includes: four munafuda (棟札) ridge tags with information on the building's construction, the High Stage (高舞台, takabutai) in front of the haraedono which is used for bugaku dance performances, the Open Stage (平舞台, hirabutai) in front of the main shrine, the left and right Kadomarōdo shrines (門客神社, kadomarōdojinja) located in front of the main shrine to either side of the hitasaki front lantern. The gate guards, toyoiwamado no kami (豊石窓神) and kushiiwamado no kami (櫛石窓神) are enshrined in them, the left and right gakubō (楽房) gagaku dance music halls in front of the main shrine, one for each type of gagaku dance: "left dance" from India and the Tang dynasty, "right dance" from China and Korea.)	Itsukushima Shrine	6×3, single-storied, irimoya style, entrance in the gable ends, rear of roof is connected, hinoki cypress bark shingles. The shrine is a World Heritage Site.	early Kamakura period, 1241	Hatsukaichi, Hiroshima 34°17′46″N 132°19′11″E	Frontal view of a wooden building with vermillion red beams. A platform with red handrail is located in front of the building. A half-open wooden building with a gabled roof on a platform over water.
auxiliary Marōdo Shrine (Shrine for Guest Deities) (客神社, marōdo jinja): Main Hall (本殿, honden), Oratory (拝殿, haiden), Offering Hall (幣殿, heiden) (Note: The nomination includes the fence around the shrine.)	Itsukushima Shrine	Honden: 5×4, ryōnagare style Heiden: 1×1, ryōsage style Haiden: 9×3, kirizuma style All three structures are single-storied and have hinoki cypress bark shingles. The shrine is a World Heritage Site.	early Kamakura period, 1241	Hatsukaichi, Hiroshima 34°17′48″N 132°19′12″E	A roofed corridor and two connected buildings with gabled roofs. All of them have vermillion red wooden beams, white walls and are standing on stilts. Beyond the buildings in the background on a hill stands a five-storied red colored pagoda and a large building with gabled roof.
auxiliary Marōdo Shrine (Shrine for Guest Deities) (客神社, marōdo jinja): Purification Hall (祓殿, haraedono)	Itsukushima Shrine	4×3, single-storied, irimoya style, entrances on the gable ends, at the back connected to the haiden roof, hinoki cypress bark shingles. The shrine is a World Heritage Site.	early Kamakura period, 1241	Hatsukaichi, Hiroshima 34°17′47″N 132°19′12″E	A wooden building with red beams on poles above water.
East Corridor (東廻廊, higashi kairō) (Note: 19 munafuda (棟札) ridge tags with information on the building's construction are attached to the nomination.)	Itsukushima Shrine	45 ken long, single-storied, kirizuma style roof with hinoki cypress bark shingles. Extends from the entrance of Itsukushima Shrine past the Marōdo Shrine and the Asazaya to the purification hall of the main shrine. The shrine is a World Heritage Site.	Azuchi-Momoyama period, Eiroku to Keichō era, 1558–1615	Hatsukaichi, Hiroshima 34°17′46″N 132°19′13″E	A wooden roofed corridor on stilts over water with red beams and red handrails. Roofed wooden corridor over water with red beams.
West Corridor (西廻廊, nishi kairō)	Itsukushima Shrine	62 ken long, single-storied, kirizuma style gable at the eastern end and karahafu gable at the western end, covered with hinoki cypress bark shingles. The shrine is a World Heritage Site.	Azuchi-Momoyama period, 1563–1602	Hatsukaichi, Hiroshima 34°17′44″N 132°19′10″E	A wooden corridor on stilts with red beams and a red handrail. There are metal lanterns hanging from the ceiling.
Main Hall (本殿, honden) (Note: Four munafuda (棟札) ridge tags with information on the building's construction and five miniature shrines (玉殿, gyokuden) are attached to the nomination.)	Sumiyoshi Shrine	9 bay wide structure consisting of five concatenated buildings under a single flowing roof, covered with hinoki cypress bark shingles, the front roof has five dormers with chidori hafu bargeboards	early Muromachi period, 1370	Shimonoseki, Yamaguchi 33°59′59″N 130°57′23″E	
Main Hall (本殿, honden)	Kandani Shrine	3×2, oldest extant example of the flowing roof style covered with hinoki cypress bark shingles	early Kamakura period, 1219	Sakaide, Kagawa 34°19′29″N 133°55′00″E	Small wooden building with a curved roof and stairs leading to a platform surrounding the building.
Main Hall (本殿, honden) (Note: One munafuda (棟札) ridge tag with information on the building's construction and five inscription boards (銘札) are attached to the nomination.)	Aoi Aso Shrine	3×2, flowing roof style with copper-tile roofing, connected to the south with the heiden via the corridor	Azuchi-Momoyama period, 1610	Hitoyoshi, Kumamoto 32°12′49″N 130°45′10″E	—
Corridor (廊, rō)	Aoi Aso Shrine	1×1, single-storied, kirizuma style with copper-tile roofing, connects the honden in the north with the heiden in the south	Azuchi-Momoyama period, 1610	Hitoyoshi, Kumamoto 32°12′49″N 130°45′10″E	—
Offering Hall (幣殿, heiden)	Aoi Aso Shrine	5×3, single-storied, yosemune style (Note: (yosemune-zukuri, 寄棟造): a hipped roof where the front and back are trapezoidal and the sides triangular in shape; in Japan generally used for buildings of less importance.) on north side, connected to the haiden on the south side, thatched roof	Azuchi-Momoyama period, 1610	Hitoyoshi, Kumamoto 32°12′48″N 130°45′10″E	—
Oratory (拝殿, haiden)	Aoi Aso Shrine	7×3, single-storied, yosemune style with a 1 ken step canopy and a karahafu gable, thatched roof for the main building and copper-tile roof for the step canopy, connected in the north to the heiden	Azuchi-Momoyama period, 1611	Hitoyoshi, Kumamoto 32°12′48″N 130°45′11″E	Three-quarter view of a wooden building with a thatched hip roof. Another structure of similar style extends from the back of the building.
Rōmon (楼門)	Aoi Aso Shrine	3×2 two-storied gate with entrance through the central bay, yosemune style, thatched roof	Azuchi-Momoyama period, 1613	Hitoyoshi, Kumamoto 32°12′47″N 130°45′11″E	A two-storied wooden gate with a large thatched roof and a veranda with handrail on the upper floor.
Main Hall (本殿, honden), Offering Hall (幣殿, heiden), Oratory (拝殿, haiden)	Kirishima-Jingū	Honden: 5×4, single-storied, irimoya style with a 1 ken step canopy 2×3, single-storied, ryōsage style; Haiden: 7×3, irimoya style, front with a chidori hafu bargeboard, 1 ken step canopy; all with copper-tile roofing	mid Edo period, 1715	Kirishima, Kagoshima 31°51′32″N 130°52′17″E	
Main Hall (本殿, honden)	Usa Shrine	hachiman style, where both "buildings" are single-storied kirizuma style with hinoki cypress bark shingles. The rear part, called nai-in (内院), is 3×2, the front part, called ge-in (外院) is 3×1 with a 1 ken step canopy.	late Edo period, 1855	Usa, Ōita 33°31′24″N 131°22′38″E	

== See also ==
- For an explanation of terms concerning Shinto, shrines and shrine architecture, see the glossary of Shinto.
