= Miho Shrine =

Shinto shrine in Shimane Prefecture, Japan

Miho Jinja 美保神社
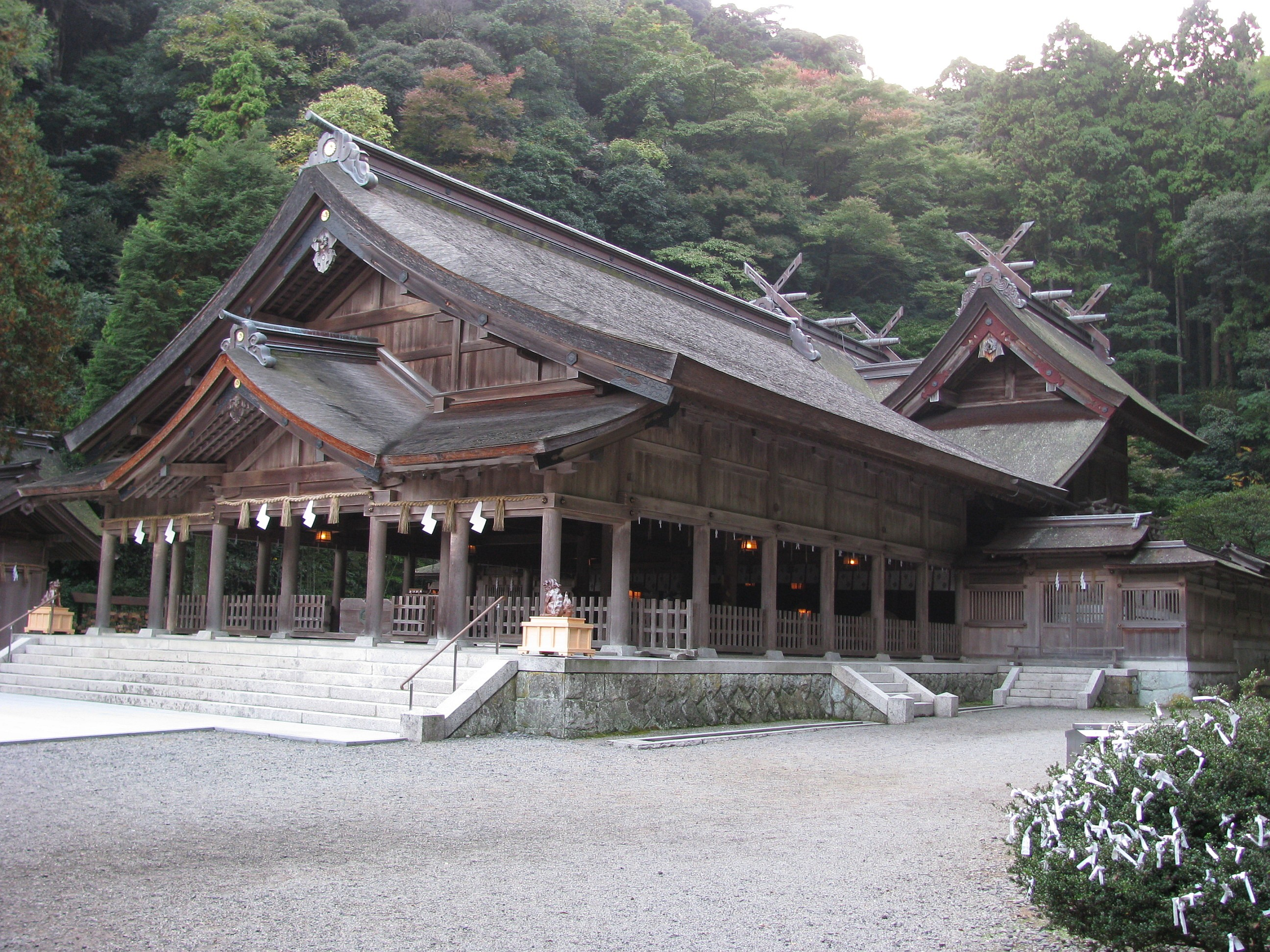
- Miho Jinja

- Location within Japan

Religion
- Affiliation: Shinto

Location
- Interactive map of Miho Jinja 美保神社
- Coordinates: 35°33′44″N 133°18′22″E

Miho Jinja (美保神社) is a Shinto shrine in Matsue, Shimane Prefecture, Japan. The Taisha-zukuri Honden of 1813 is an Important Cultural Property. A collection of 846 musical instruments dedicated to the shrine, and two dugout-canoes used in the Morotabune rite have been designated as Important Tangible Folk Cultural Property.

== See also ==
- Important Tangible Folk Cultural Properties
- Modern system of ranked Shinto Shrines
- Yaegaki Jinja
- Kamosu Jinja
- Sada Jinja
- Izumo Taisha
