= Kangi-in =

Buddhist temple in Saitama Prefecture, Japan

Coordinates: 36.2282°N 139.3747°E

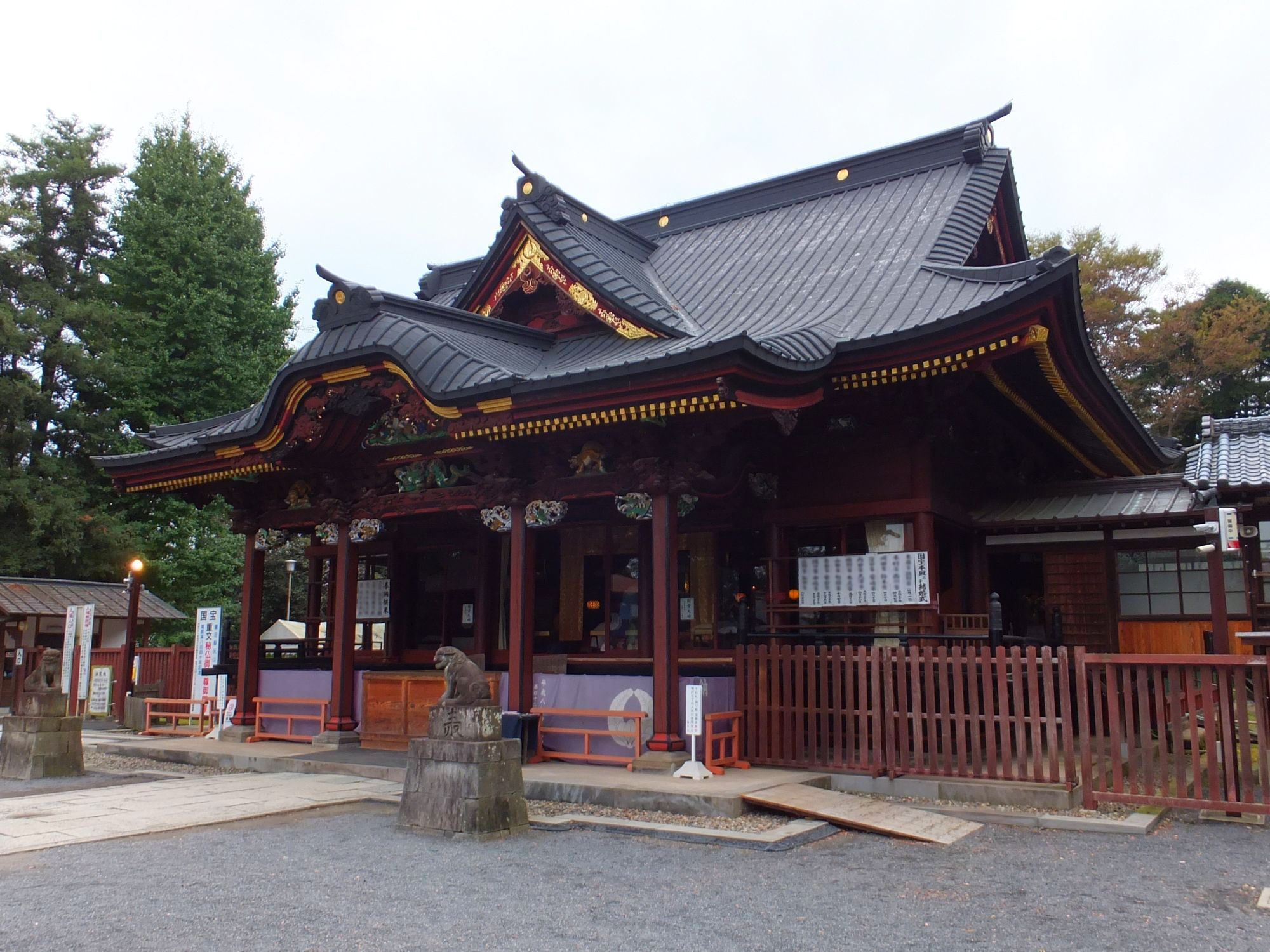
Shōden-dō hall of Kangi-in temple (Menuma Shōden) in Kumagaya, Saitama Prefecture

Kangi-in (歓喜院) is a Buddhist temple in Kumagaya, Saitama Prefecture, Japan. It was founded in 1179 and is affiliated with the Kōyasan Shingon-shū sect of Buddhism. The temple's Shōden Hall (聖天堂, shōden-dō) was designated as a Japanese National Treasure in 1984. It is the only building in Saitama to have been designated as a national treasure.

== History ==
The temple is said to have been built in 1179 by Saito Sanemori, a military leader under Minamoto no Yoshitomo who later fought for the Taira clan in the Genpei War. He enshrined an image of the god Kangiten (also known as Shōten or Shōden) in the hall that became Kangi-in. When Saito was killed in the Genpei War, his second son, Sanenaga founded Kangi-in as a temple to oversee the hall where his father had placed the image. The hall is open for public worship and there is a separate hall used for the religious instruction of priests.

Shōden Hall was built in the Gongen style with an inner, middle, and exterior hall for worship. After a fire destroyed an earlier structure in 1670, master carpenter Hayashi Masakiyo began work on the three halls in 1735, and his son completed the project in 1760.

There are three gates leading to Kangi-in. The first gate, Kisōmon, was built in 1851 by a local craftsman, Hayashi Masamichi.

== Present day ==
In 2010, the Agency for Cultural Affairs renovated the temple at the cost of 1.3 billion yen.

== See also ==
- List of National Treasures of Japan (shrines)
