= Namura Shrine =

Shinto shrine in Ryūō, Shiga Prefecture, Japan

Namura Jinja 苗村神社
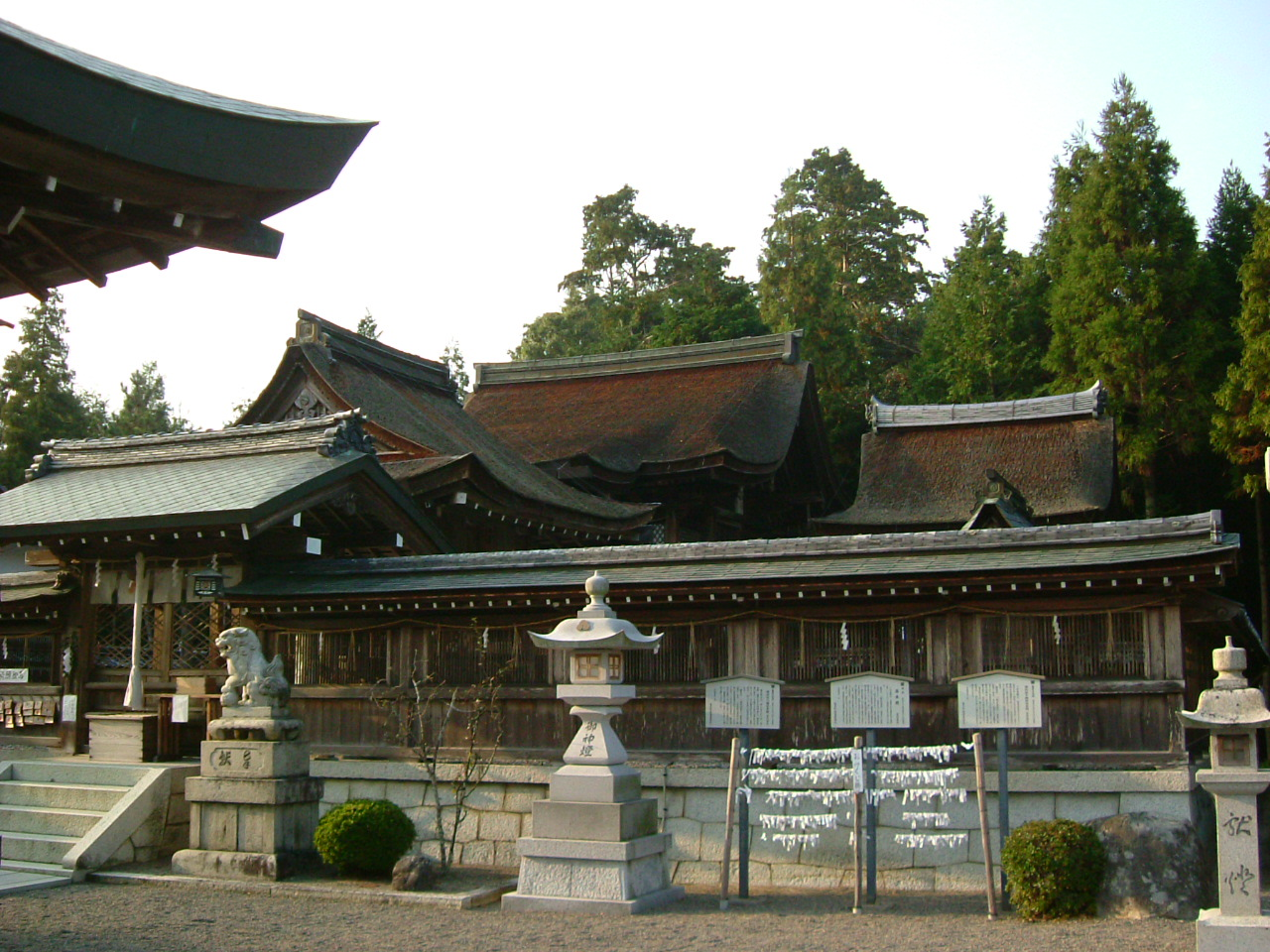
- Nishi-Honden of Namura Jinja (NT)

- Namura Jinja Namura Shrine (Japan)

Religion
- Affiliation: Shinto
- Deity: Ōkuninushi, Kotoshironushi, Susanoo-no-Mikoto, Kunisatsuchi
- Festival: April 20, May 5

Location
- Location: Ryūō-cho, Shiga-ken
- Interactive map of Namura Jinja 苗村神社
- Coordinates: 35°3′53.5″N 136°7′40.5″E

Architecture
- Founder: c. Emperor Suinin
- Established: c.29 BC to 70 AD

Website
- Official website

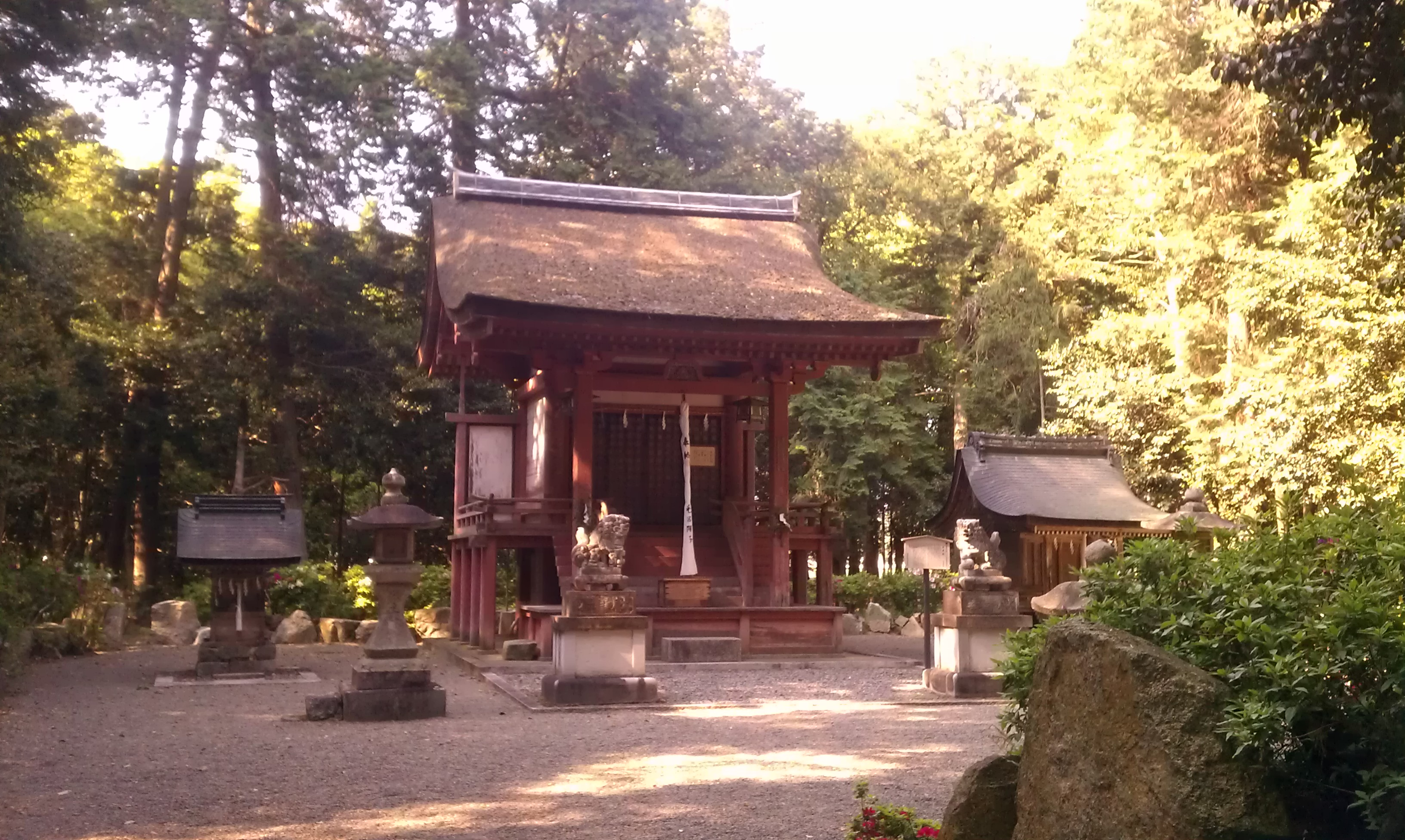
Higashi-Honden (ICP)

Namura Shrine (苗村神社) is a Shinto shrine located in the town of Ryūō, Shiga Prefecture, Japan. The shrine has many structures from the Muromachi period or older which are designated either National Treasures (NT) or Important Cultural Properties (ICP). Although the shrine holds annual festivals, the shrine's main festival is held only once every 33 years.

== History ==
The foundation of the shrine is uncertain. Per the shrine's own legend, it was founded during the time of the semi-legendary Emperor Suinin (who reigned 29 BC to 70 AD per the traditional calendar). The Higashi-Honden is built on the grounds of the Higashi Namura Kofun cluster, a group of Kofun period burial mounds dating from around the 6th century AD. The shrine first appears in documentary records in the Engishiki listing of Shinto shrines in Ōmi Province, compiled in 927 AD. In 969 AD, it was recorded that the kami of Mount Kinpu from Yamato Province, Kunisatsuchi-no-mikoto was enshrined in a new main shrine building at the Namura Jinja. This new building was designated the "Nishi-Honden", whereas the original main building was renamed the Higashi-Honden.

As this shrine was designated for the supply of pine sprigs for use in making kadomatsu as part of the new year's rituals at the Imperial Palace from 1017 AD, the shrine was given the name of Namura Jinja by Emperor Go-Ichijō. In 1536, Emperor Go-Nara awarded the shrine an official rank of Senior First Court Rank. During the Tenshō era (1573–1593), Oda Nobunaga presented the shrine with a saddle and a sword.

In 1881, following the Meiji restoration and the establishment of the Modern system of ranked Shinto shrines under State Shinto, the shrine was officially designated a "county shrine". It was promoted to the rank of "prefectural shrine" in 1920.

Namura Jinja is a 15-minute drive from Ōmi-Hachiman Station on then JR West Biwako Line.

== Cultural Properties ==
Nishi-Honden (西本殿)
Kamakura period (1308), three ken wide, nagare-zukuri-style with a one ken step canopy and hinoki cypress bark shingles. Designated a National Treasure in 1955. Designation includes a ridge tag with information on the building's construction and one miniature shrine
Hachiman-sha (八幡社)
mid-Muromachi period, Designated an Important Cultural Property in 1904.
Juzenshi-sha (十禅師社)
mid-Muromachi period, Designated an Important Cultural Property in 1971.
Mikoshiko (神輿庫)
Muromachi period (1536), Designated an Important Cultural Property in 1971.
Rōmon (楼門)
Muromachi period (1522), Designated an Important Cultural Property in 1904.
Higashi-Honden (東本殿)
mid-Muromachi period, Designated an Important Cultural Property in 1924.

== See also ==
- List of Shinto shrines
- List of National Treasures of Japan (shrines)
