= Aoi Aso Shrine =

Shinto shrine in Hitoyoshi, Kumamoto Prefecture, Japan

Aoi Aso Shrine (青井阿蘇神社, Aoi Aso Jinja)
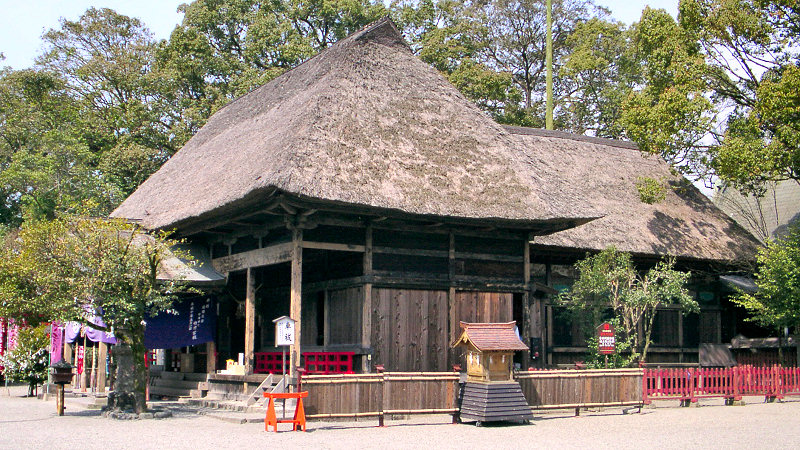
- Oratory (National Treasure of Japan)

- Location within Japan

Religion
- Affiliation: Shinto

Location
- Location: Hitoyoshi, Kumamoto Prefecture, Japan
- Interactive map of Aoi Aso Shrine (青井阿蘇神社, Aoi Aso Jinja)
- Coordinates: 32°12′48″N 130°45′10″E

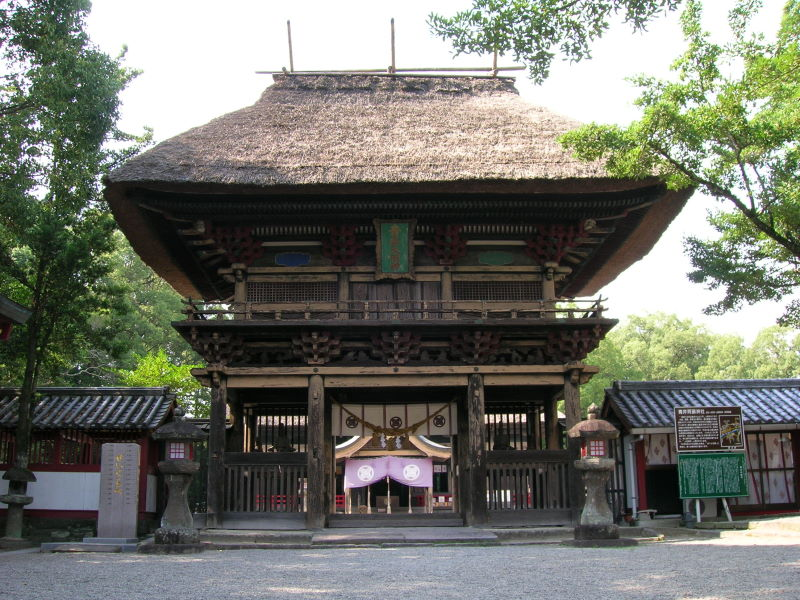
Rōmon (National Treasure of Japan)

Aoi Aso Shrine (青井阿蘇神社, Aoi Aso Jinja) is a Shinto shrine in Hitoyoshi, Kumamoto Prefecture, Japan. It is colloquially known as Aoi-san (青井さん). It was originally established as a prefectural shrine, but is currently designated as a national shrine (別表神社, Beppyo Jinja). Five of the structures within the shrine are listed as National Treasures of Japan.

During the 2020 Kyushu floods the shrine was flooded, but only parts of the bridge were destroyed. No significant damage to the National treasures of Japan were reported.

== Deities ==
The shrine enshrines Takeiwatatsu-no-Mikoto, his consort Asotsuhime-no-Mikoto, and their son Hayamikatama-no-Mikoto. These three deities are three of the 12 deities enshrined at Aso Shrine in Aso City, Kumamoto Prefecture, where it is locally known as Aso Sanja.

Until the early modern period, Shinto and Buddhism were practiced based on the Shinto aspects of both parts, with the god Takeiwatatsu-no-Mikoto enshrining the Eleven-Headed Kannon, the god Asutsuhime-no-Mikoto enshrining Fudo Myo-o, and the god Kunizo Hayamikatama enshrining Bishamonten as the main Buddha. However, in 1665, the shrine was converted to be a completely Shinto shrine.

== History ==
According to legend, on September 9, 806, the chief priest of the Aso Shrine, Korimoto Ogata Gonsuke, enshrined the three Aso shrines of Aoi-go, Kuma-gun into the Aoi Aso Shrine. Later on, the shrine was rebuilt in the middle of the 11th century, and was rebuilt a second time when Sagara Nagayori became the lord of the area in 1198. The shrine would be renovated continuously, notably again in 1491.

In the Yatsushiro Nikki (Yatsushiro Diary), it is written that the Yatsushiro-shu of Yatsushiro held a Shinto judgment (Ichimi Shinsui) at Myokenomiya (now Yatsushiro Shrine) on February 23, 1558, regarding the 17 laws enacted on February 26, 1558. The "Harui" is a misprint of "Aoi" and refers to this shrine, and it is likely that the public discussion before the enactment and the divine judgment after the enactment took place at this shrine. This indicates that the shrine was not only an object of worship for the Sagara clan, but also an entity that controlled their vassals.

Starting in the early modern Period, the shrine was known as Aoi Daimyojin. Sagara Yorifusa, the 20th generational head of the Sagara family, prayed for victory in battle at this shrine when he left for Korea during the Japanese invasion of Korea in 1597.The shrine was then designated as the head shrine of more than 250 shrines in Kuma County. The same year, he donated 1 town and 1,000 paces of rice fields in Ōmura and built a large shrine hall as a reward for praying for victory in battle. Although the shrine is an offshoot of Aso Shrine, the relationship with the main Aso Shrine was weak, probably because the Aso family was often at odds with the Sagara clan during the civil war between the Northern and Southern dynasties as well as the Warring States period. As a result, the shrine is thought to have had its own religious development independent of the main shrine.

In August 1872, the shrine was listed as a township level shrine. In November 1935, it was promoted to a prefectural level shrine.

It is located in the floodplain of the Kuma River and has historically suffered floods. In 1965, the Kuma River was flooded to a depth of 2.1 meters (6.9 feet), and in 1971 to a depth of 1.1 meters (3.6 feet). During the 2020 Kyushu floods, the flooded area reached a depth of 4.3 meters (14 feet). The shrine itself during the incident was flooded above the ground floor and the parapets Misogi Bridge were damaged by the floodwater.

== Structure ==
=== Main Shrine ===
The five existing main shrines, the main hall, the hall of worship, the main hall of worship, and the tower gate were all built between 1610 and 1618. The construction of the structured were ordered by the first lord of the Hitoyoshi domain, Nagamasa Sagara, and his chief retainer, Seibei Sagara.

The main shrine's roof is constructed of copper plate covered with a layer of thatch. In keeping with the traditional style of the region, the crosspieces on the sides and back of the shrine are constructed in a "x" shape, and the small walls above the shrine's horizontal wooden pillars have small architectural gaps. Connected to the main shrine is a small copper-played corridor that connects to the shrines Heiden. Importantly, the left and right pillars of the shrine are carved with images of dragons which is thought to have historically influenced shrine design in southern Kyushu. The Heiden itself is a traditional thatched roof building in a hipped-roof style design. The inside of the shrine's Heiden is characterized by decorative sculptures that flow seamlessly across the buildings interior architectural pillars as well as its intricate metalworking designs. The aforementioned buildings and its connecting corridor were completed in 1610. The main worship hall itself was finished the following year in 1611. The worship hall is designed with a similar copper-plated roof. Overall the shrine is divided into three parts: The worship hall, The Kagura hall, and the shrine itself.

=== Other Structures ===
Kusunoki, which stands beside the main shrine of the precinct, is a sacred tree that is said to be the place where the head office spirit was first enshrined. It is 18 meters in circumference, 19 meters in height, and splits into two trunks at one meter above the ground. It is the largest camphor tree in the Hitoyoshi area and has been designated as a natural monument by Hitoyoshi City since 1958. In front of the shrine's tower gate is a Koi Pond which, according to legend, the dragon sculptures escape at night to drink water from.

In October 2015, a tombstone was erected in a section of the precincts to honor Edo sumo wrestler Inosuke Kumagatake. In addition, a ring of dedication sumo wrestling in memory of Inosuke Kumagatake was created.

=== Branch Shrine ===
There are four branch shrines in the precincts: Inari Shrine, Kogo Shrine, Miyajitake Shrine, and Daijingu Shrine. In the past, there were more than 10 shrines.

== Cultural Information ==
=== Shinto Festivals ===
==== Natsukoshi Festival ====
It is said that Maeyori, the 7th generation of the Sagara family, started this purification ceremony in 1386. After a brief interruption, the 16th generation of the Sagara family, Yoshishige, revived it in 1533.

==== Okunchi Festival ====
In the past, the festival was held on September 9, the day of the shrine's founding. However, the Meiji era's calendar changes, the festival is now held on October 8. The series of rituals are known as the Okunchi Matsuri.

First, on October 3, a fire extinguishing festival was held to prevent fires during the festival due to the gust of "kunchi-fu" that blows during this period. On the 5th, a lottery is held to determine who will play the role of lion in the Shinto ritual. There are eight lions needed and each lion requires three people to play the role, so 24 people are needed. Early in the morning of the 8th, a purification ceremony using white chrysanthemums called "Kiku-barai" is held to purify the shrine buildings and those who will serve in the Shinto rituals. At 10:30 a.m., an annual ceremony called the offering of money ceremony is held. Inn the evening, more than ten performances of "Kuma Kagura", a nationally selected intangible folk cultural property, will be dedicated in the "Kagura-den" (worship hall) for about three hours. At 9:30 a.m. on the 9th, a palanquin-making ceremony is held to purify the participants and pray for their safety on the way to the shrine. At 10:30 a.m., a procession of lions and portable shrines is led on parades through Hitoyoshi City. It is said that in the past, the parade only went around the lotus pond in front of the tower gate, and it was a quiet ritual because the general public was not allowed to enter the shrine grounds. Finally, n the morning of the 11th, after the ritual ceremony, a "Hosansai" ceremony is held to thank the gods for the successful completion of the festival.

=== Shrine Priests ===
The Aoi clan, the founders of the shrine, served as the Grand Priest of the shrine. During the Edo period, the Aoi clan controlled the Shinto priests in the area, but the clan was severed in 1925. The Aoi family's residence and garden adjacent to the shrine have been open to the public as a "cultural garden" since 2010.

== Cultural assets ==
=== National Treasures ===
The Aoi Aso Shrine and its five contributing structures were designated as national treasures under pre-war law on January 23, 1933, post-war law in 1950, and under the most recent revision of the law on June 9, 2008. The five contributing structures are:

- The Main Hall (本殿, honden)(1 attached building tag, 5 name tags)
- The Offering Hall (幣殿, heiden)
- The Oratory (拝殿, haiden)
- The two-storied Rōmon (楼門) tower gate
- The Corridor (廊, rō)

=== Tangible Cultural Properties ===
- The Aoi Aso Shrine contains one tangible cultural property - Misogi Bridge which was registed October 27, 2017

=== Hitoyoshi City Designated Cultural Property ===
- Tangible Cultural Properties
  - Aoi Grand Shrine: Inner and Outer Shrines (Buildings) - Designated on May 28, 2013.
  - Itae Gosho (painting) - Designated on March 31, 1987.
  - Hanging Buddha (artifact) - designated on March 31, 1987.
- Natural Monuments
  - Camphor of Aoi Aso Shrine - Designated on March 10, 1958.
