= Sada Shrine =

Shinto shrine in Shimane Prefecture, Japan

Sada Jinja 佐太神社
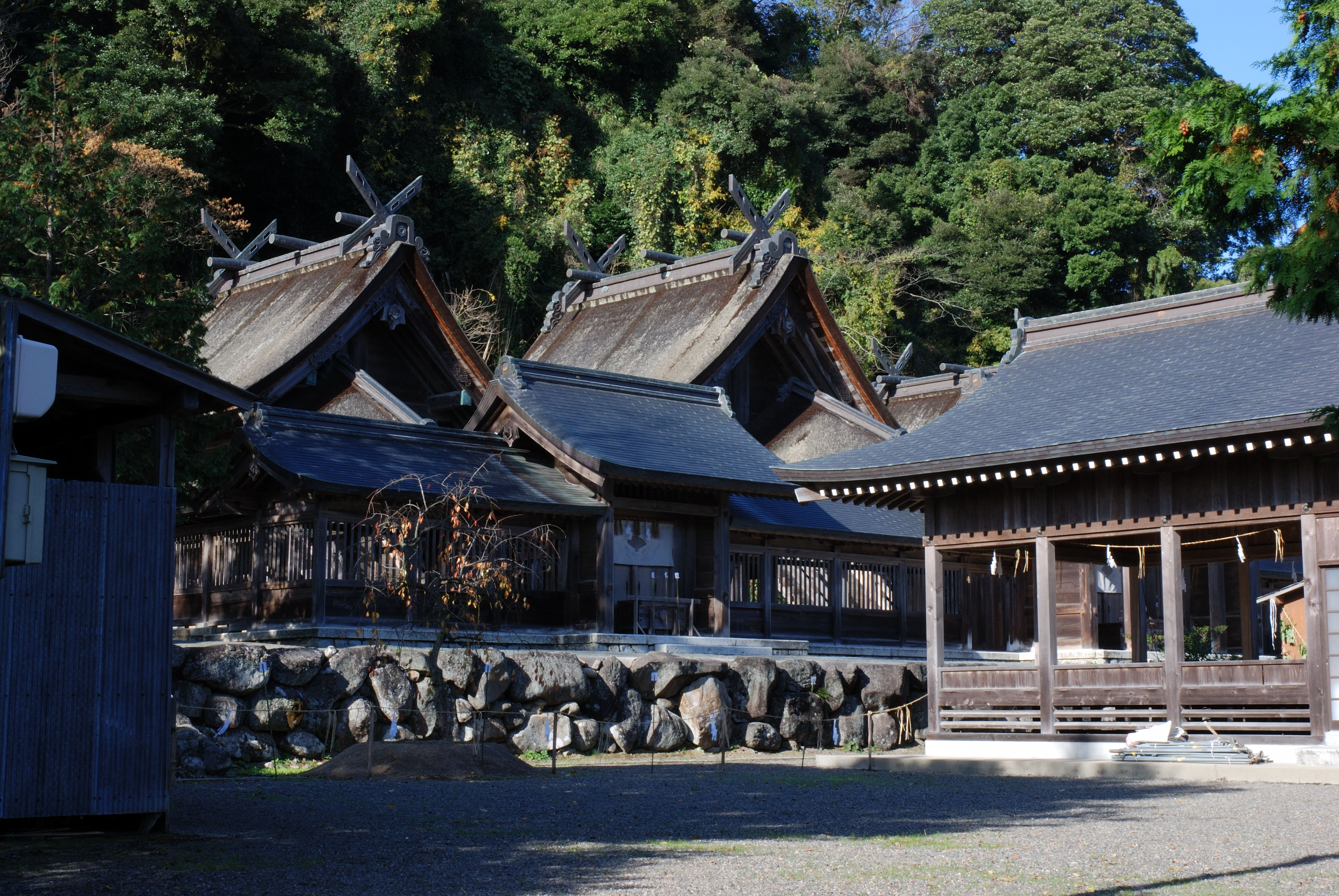
- Sada Jinja

- Location within Japan

Religion
- Affiliation: Shinto

Location
- Interactive map of Sada Jinja 佐太神社
- Coordinates: 35°30′32″N 133°0′23″E

Website
- sadajinjya.jp/index.php

Sada Jinja (佐太神社) is a Shinto shrine in Matsue, Shimane Prefecture, Japan. The Taisha-zukuri north, central and south halls of 1807 are Important Cultural Properties.

Sada Shin Noh, ritual purification dances performed annually on 24 and 25 September, have been designated an Important Intangible Folk Cultural Property. In 2011 Sada Shin Noh was inscribed on the UNESCO Representative List of the Intangible Cultural Heritage of Humanity.

== See also ==
- List of Important Intangible Folk Cultural Properties
- Modern system of ranked Shinto Shrines
- Yaegaki Jinja
- Kamosu Jinja
- Izumo Taisha
- Representative List of the Intangible Cultural Heritage of Humanity
