= Katsuogi =

Decorative logs in Shinto architecture

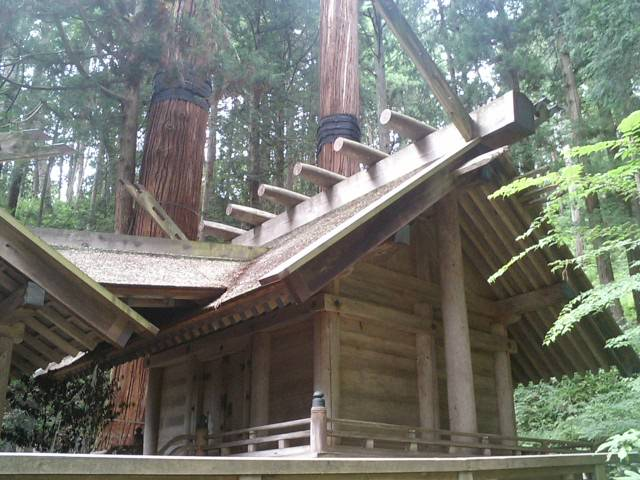
Katsuogi with chigi on the Nishina Shinmei Shrine

Katsuogi (鰹木, 堅魚木, 勝男木, 葛緒木) or Kasoegi (斗木) are short, decorative logs used in Japanese and Shinto architecture. They are placed at right angles to the ridgeline of roofs, and are usually featured in religious or imperial architecture. Katsuogi predate Buddhist influence and are an architectural element endemic to Japan. They are often placed on the roof with chigi, a forked ornamentation used on Shinto shrines. Today, katsuogi and chigi are used exclusively on Shinto buildings and can be used to distinguish them from other religious structures, such as Buddhist temples in Japan.

== Origin ==
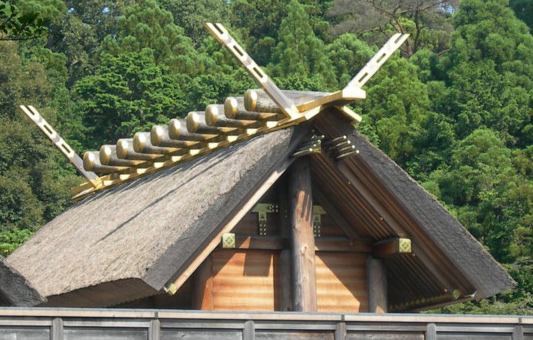
Katsuogi placed along the roof ridgepole at Ise Shrine

The original purpose of the katsuogi is uncertain. A theory is that the wooden logs were initially used to weigh down the thatch roofing seen in early Japanese structures. As construction techniques improved, the need for weights disappeared, and the logs remained only for ornamental value. Their existence during the Kofun period (250–538) is in any case well documented by numerous artifacts.

Like the chigi, the katsuogi was initially reserved only for the powerful nobility. It was first described in the Kojiki, a 7th-century Japanese text, where it seemed to be something accessible only to the emperor. In the excerpt, Emperor Yūryaku (418–479) sees an official's house laden with katsuogi on the roof. Angered by this, he pronounces the official a knave and a scoundrel for building a house in imitation of the imperial palace.

Later in history, emperors granted families such as the Nakatomi clan and the Mononobe clan permission to use katsuogi on their houses. As these clans were fervent supporters and administrators of Shinto, the katsuogi would eventually come to decorate Shinto shrines. By the 6th century, katsuogi were beginning to be used on the homes of powerful families, along with chigi. After the Meiji restoration (1868) their use in new shrines was limited to the honden.

== Design ==
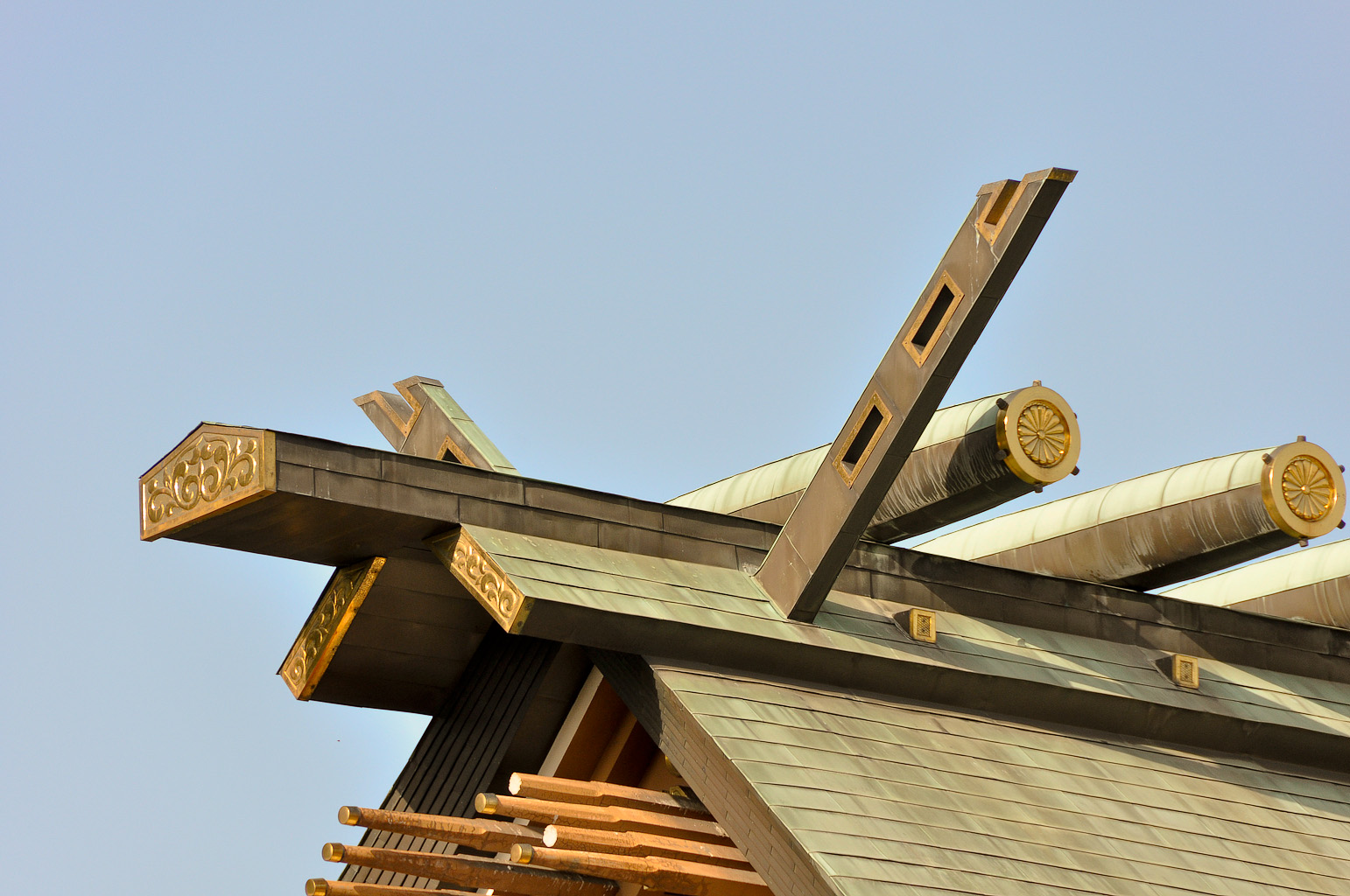
Katsuogi decorated with the Imperial Seal of Japan

The katsuogi is usually a short, rounded log. Most are round, although square or diamond shapes have occasionally been used. Some are carved with tapered ends. More ornate katsuogi will be covered in gold or bronze, and decorated with the clan symbol or motif.

The number of katsuogi used on any given roof varies, but in general there is always at least one on each end. Earlier buildings tend to employ more katsuogi. Katsuogi are always used in buildings constructed in the shinmei-zukuri, kasuga-zukuri, sumiyoshi-zukuri, and taisha-zukuri styles. They are almost always paired with the chigi. The angle at which the chigi faces and the number of katsuogi the building contains are used to identify the gender of the kami enshrined within. Upward-facing chigi, with an even number of katsuogi indicate a female kami. Outward-facing chigi, with an odd number of katsuogi indicate a male kami. This is not a hard and fast rule, as there are exceptions (such as the shrines in Ise Grand Shrine.)

== See also ==
- Shinto shrine
- The Glossary of Shinto for terms concerning Shinto and Shinto architecture.
