= Hachiman-zukuri =

Traditional Japanese architectural style

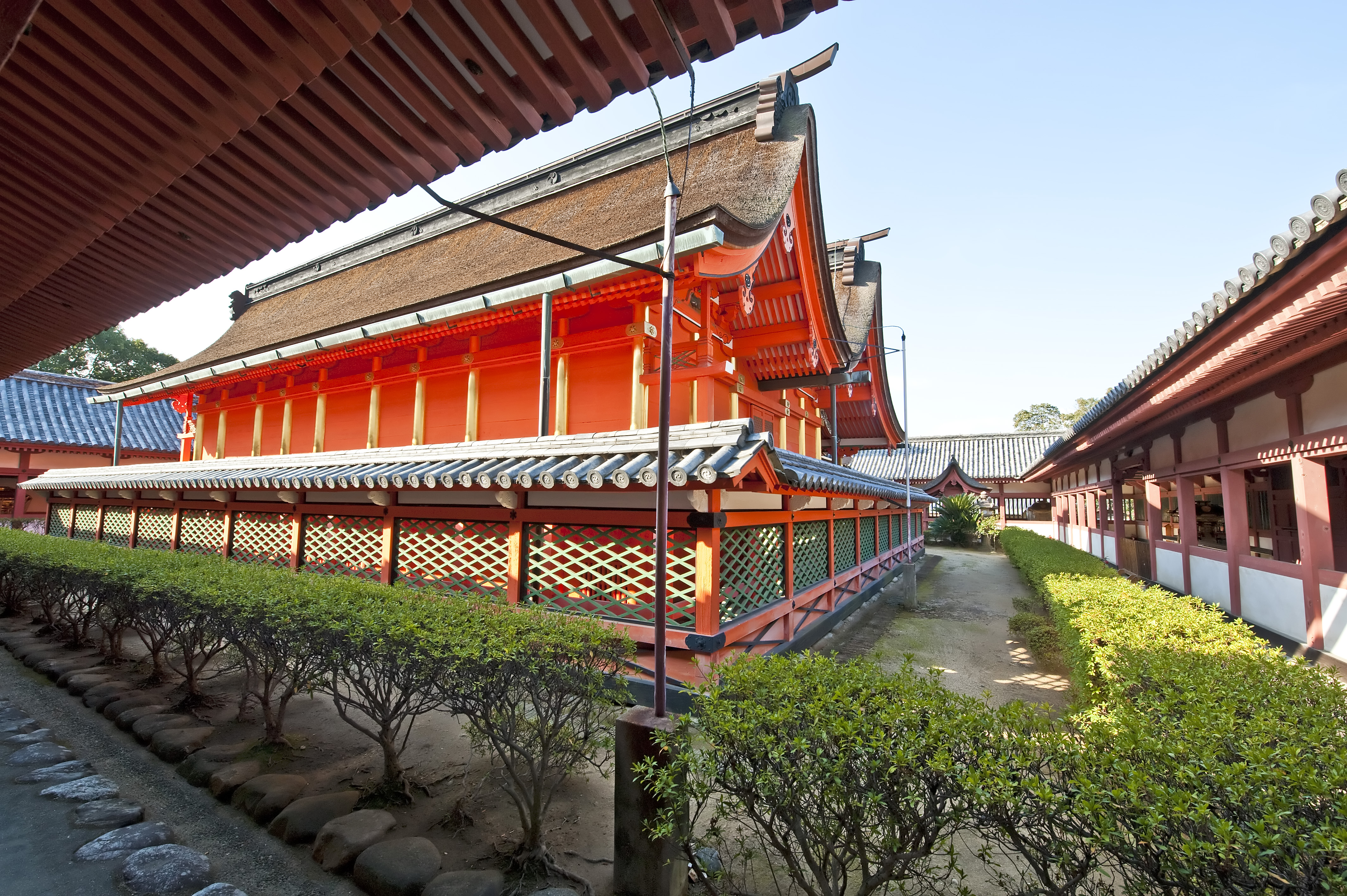
The honden at Isaniwa Shrine (伊佐爾波神社) in Matsuyama, Ehime, is a rare example of the hachiman-zukuri style. The honden (left) is surrounded by a cloister-like corridor called kairō (right).

The hachiman-zukuri (八幡造) is a traditional Japanese architectural style used at Hachiman shrines in which two parallel structures with gabled roofs are interconnected on the non-gabled side, forming one building which, when seen from the side, gives the impression of two. The front structure is called gaiden (外殿, outer sanctuary), the rear one naiden (内殿, inner sanctuary), and together they form the honden. The honden itself is surrounded by a cloister-like covered corridor called kairō (回廊) (see photo). Access is made possible by a gate called rōmon (楼門).

It has a hirairi or hirairi-zukuri (平入・平入造) structure, that is, the building has its main entrance on the side which runs parallel to the roof's ridge (non gabled-side). There are entrances also at the center of the gabled sides (see image). In general, the rear structure is 3x2 ken, while the front one is 3x1.

The space between the two structures is one ken wide and forms a room called ai-no-ma (相の間). The actual width and height of this room vary with the shrine.

Extant examples are Usa Shrine and Iwashimizu Hachiman-gū. This style, of which only five Edo period examples survive, may be of Buddhist origin, since some Buddhist buildings show the same division. For example, Tōdai-ji's hokke-dō is divided in two sections laid out front and back. Structural details also show a strong relationship with the Heian period style called shinden-zukuri used in aristocratic residences. Another possible origin of this style may have been early palaces, known to have had parallel ridges on the roof.

== An example of hachiman-zukuri style ==
Isaniwa Shrine (伊佐爾波神社) in Matsuyama, Ehime, is a rare example of the hachiman-zukuri style.

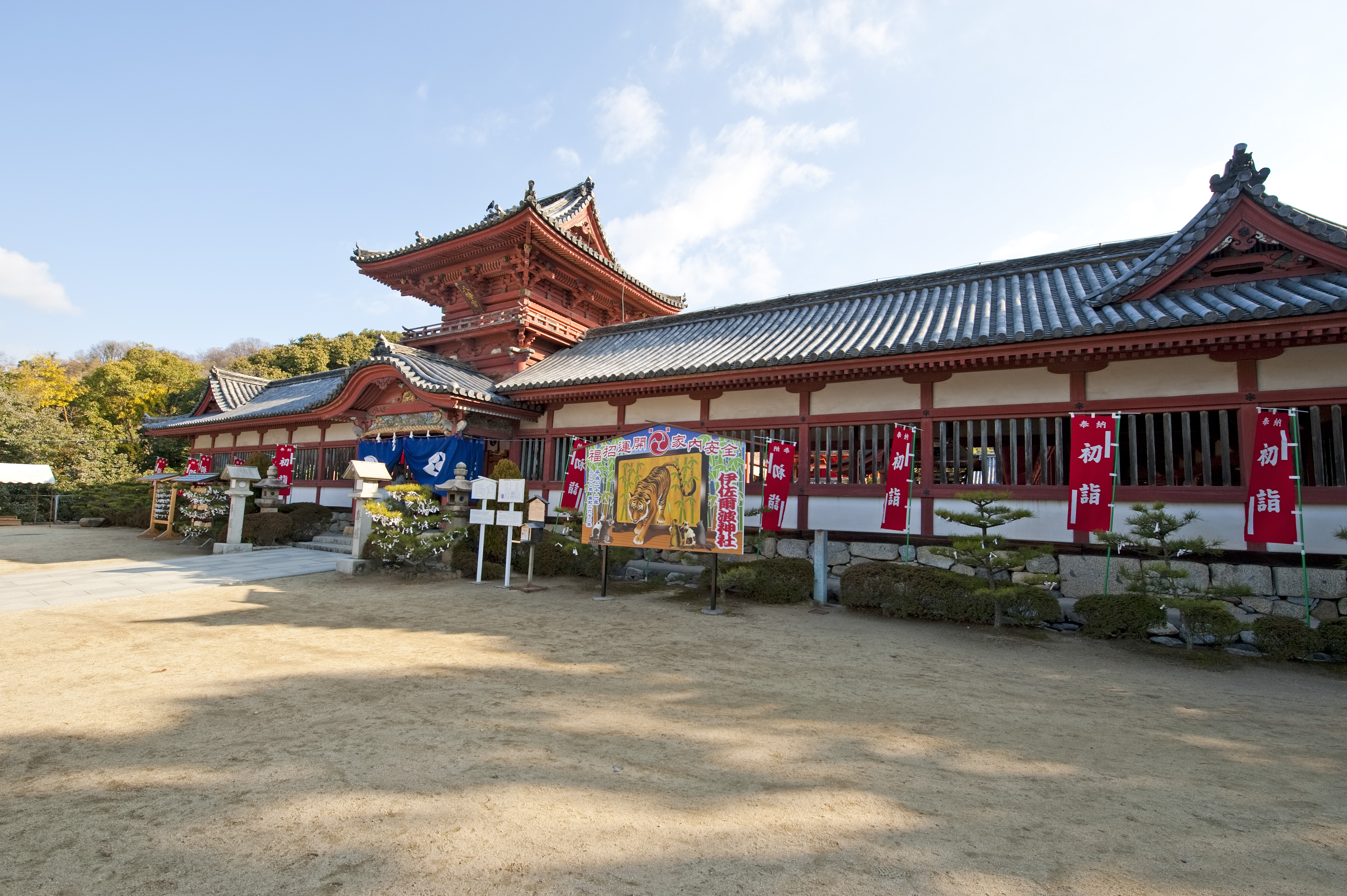
The shrine is hidden behind a cloister-like corridor called kairō (回廊). Access is possible through gate called rōmon (楼門).

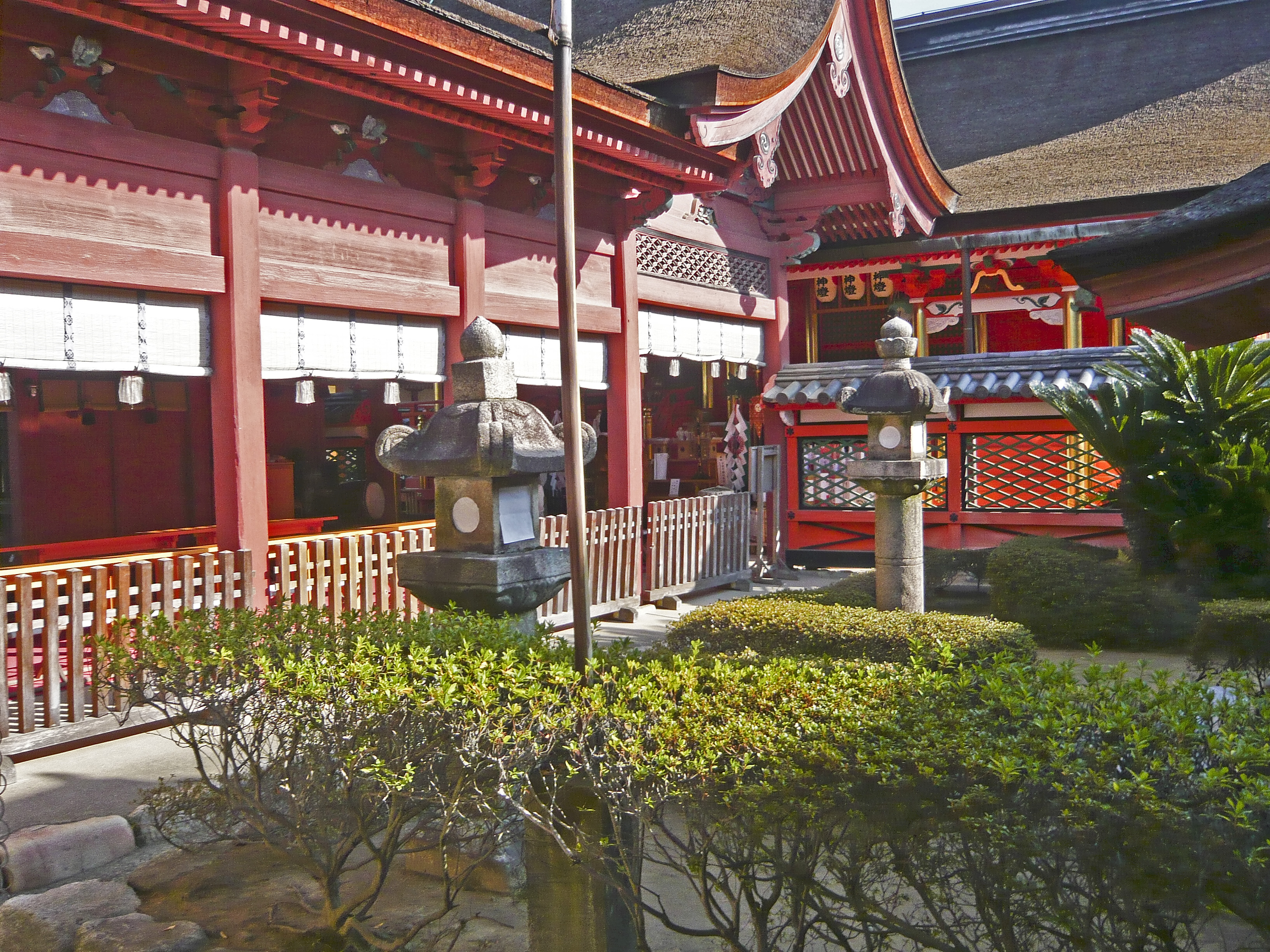
The rōmon leads to the haiden, or oratory, which in turn leads to the honden.

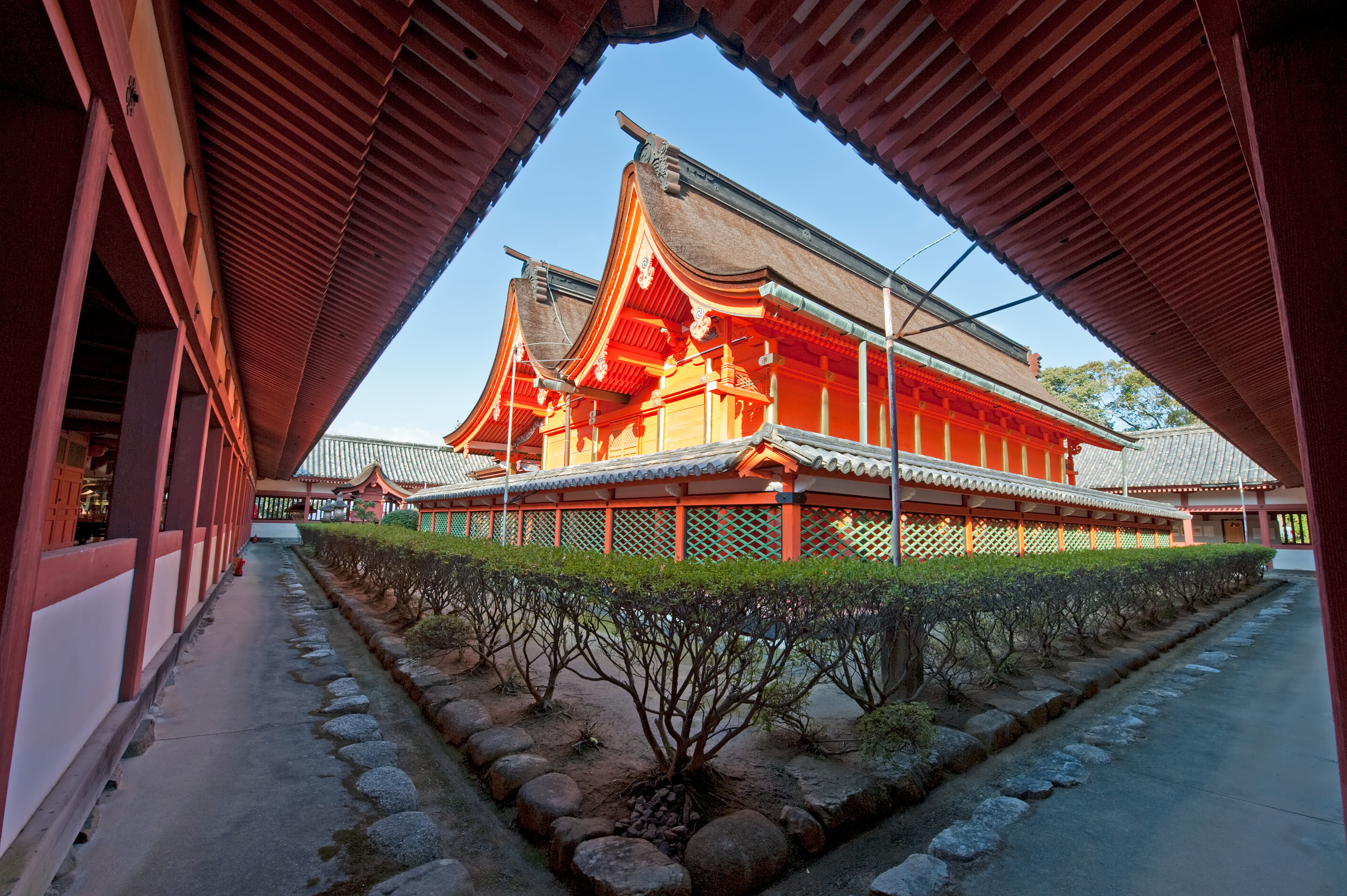
The characteristic profile of a hachiman-zukuri honden

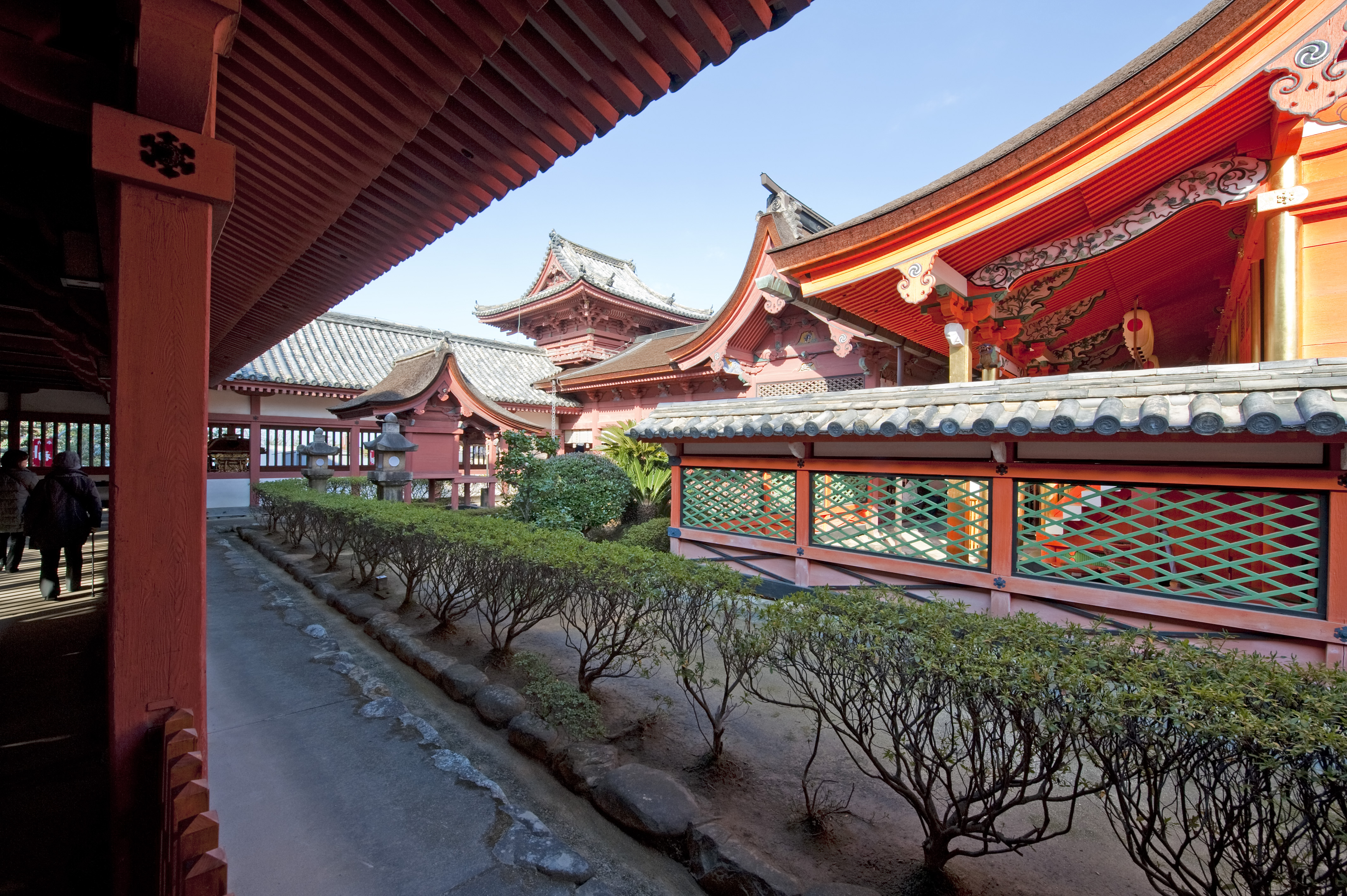
From left to right, the rōmon, the haiden, and the honden

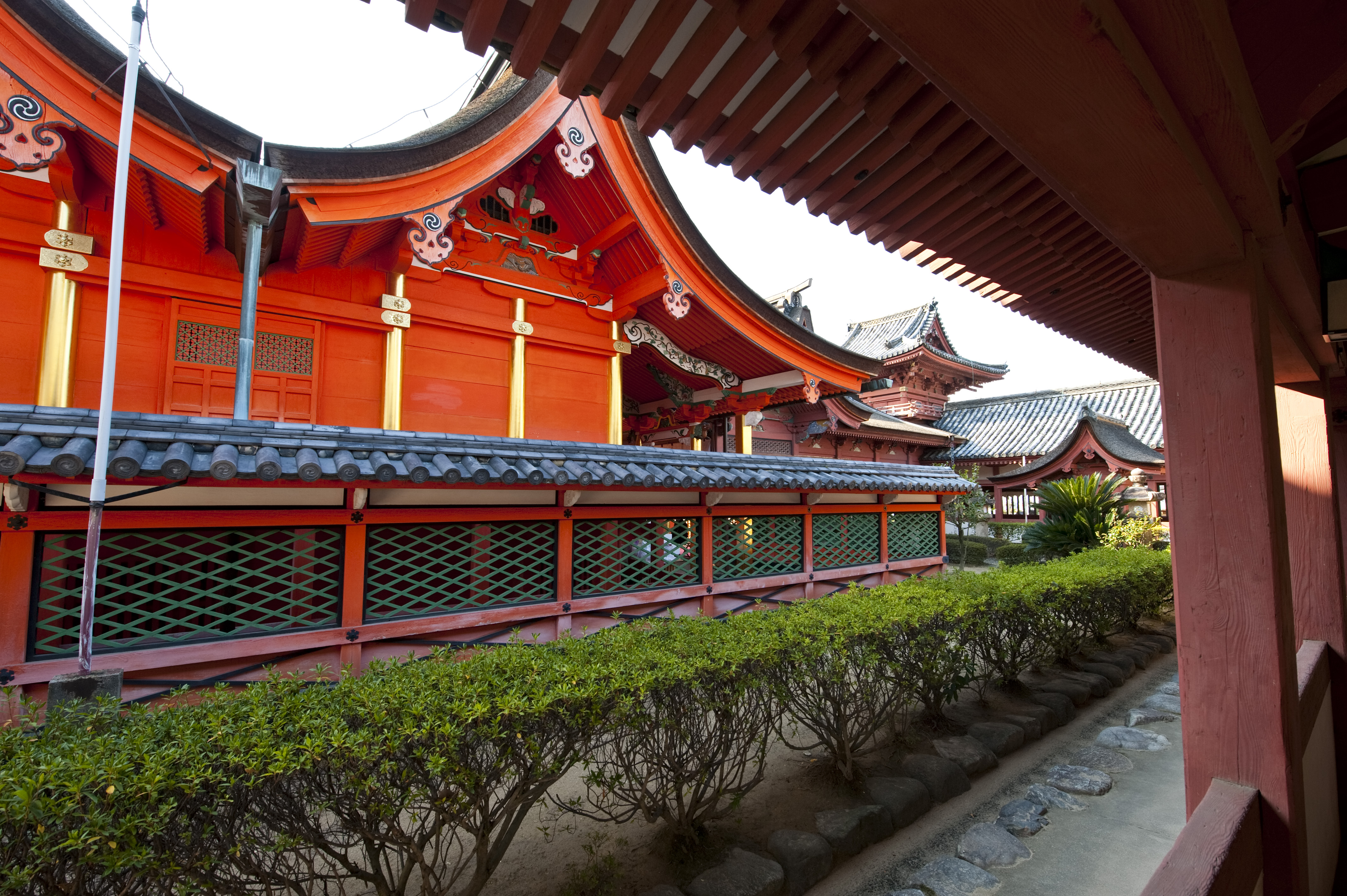
The gabled side of the honden. Visible the door of the ai-no-ma

== See also ==
- Glossary of Shinto
