= Nishina Shinmei Shrine =

Shinto shrine in Nagano Prefecture, Japan

Nishina Shinmei Shrine (仁科神明宮, Nishina Shinmeigū)
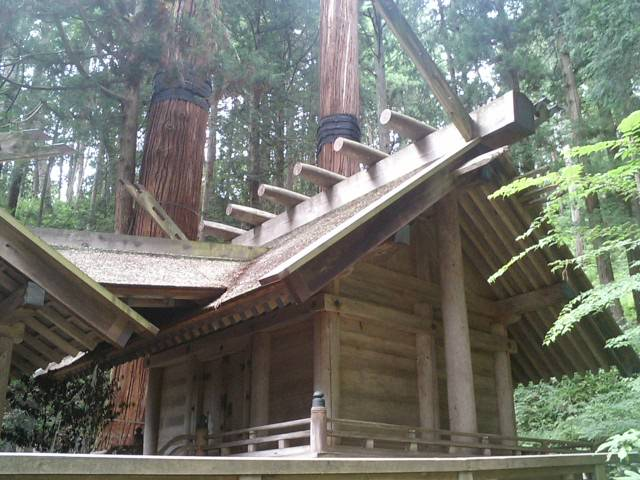
- Nishina Shinmei Shrine, Main Hall

- Location within Nagano Prefecture Location within Japan

Religion
- Affiliation: Shinto
- Deity: Amaterasu

Location
- Coordinates: 36°26′59.8″N 137°52′44.5″E

Architecture
- Style: shinmei-zukuri,
- Established: Kofun period

Website
- Official website

Nishina Shinmei Shrine (仁科神明宮, Nishina Shinmeigū) is a Shinto shrine in Ōmachi, Nagano Prefecture, Japan. The shrine is the oldest extant example of shinmei-zukuri, one of three architectural styles which were conceived before the arrival of Buddhism in Japan. It predates in fact the more famous Ise Shrine, which shares the style and has been since antiquity rebuilt every twenty years. It was ranked as a Prefectural Shrine under the Modern system of ranked Shinto shrines.

This style is characterized by an extreme simplicity. Its basic features can be seen in Japanese architecture from the Kofun period (250–538 C.E.) onwards and it is considered the pinnacle of Japanese traditional architecture. It is most common in Mie prefecture. Built in planed, unfinished wood, the honden is either 3x2 ken or 1x1ken in size, has a raised floor, a gabled roof with an entry on one the non-gabled sides (hirairi or hirairi-zukuri (平入・平入造)), no upward curve at the eaves, and purely decorative logs called chigi (vertical) and katsuogi (horizontal) protruding from the roof's ridge.

Two of its structures, the Main Hall (本殿, honden) and the Inner Gate (中門, chūmon), are listed as National Treasures of Japan.
