= Hiyoshi-zukuri =

Shinto shrine architectural style

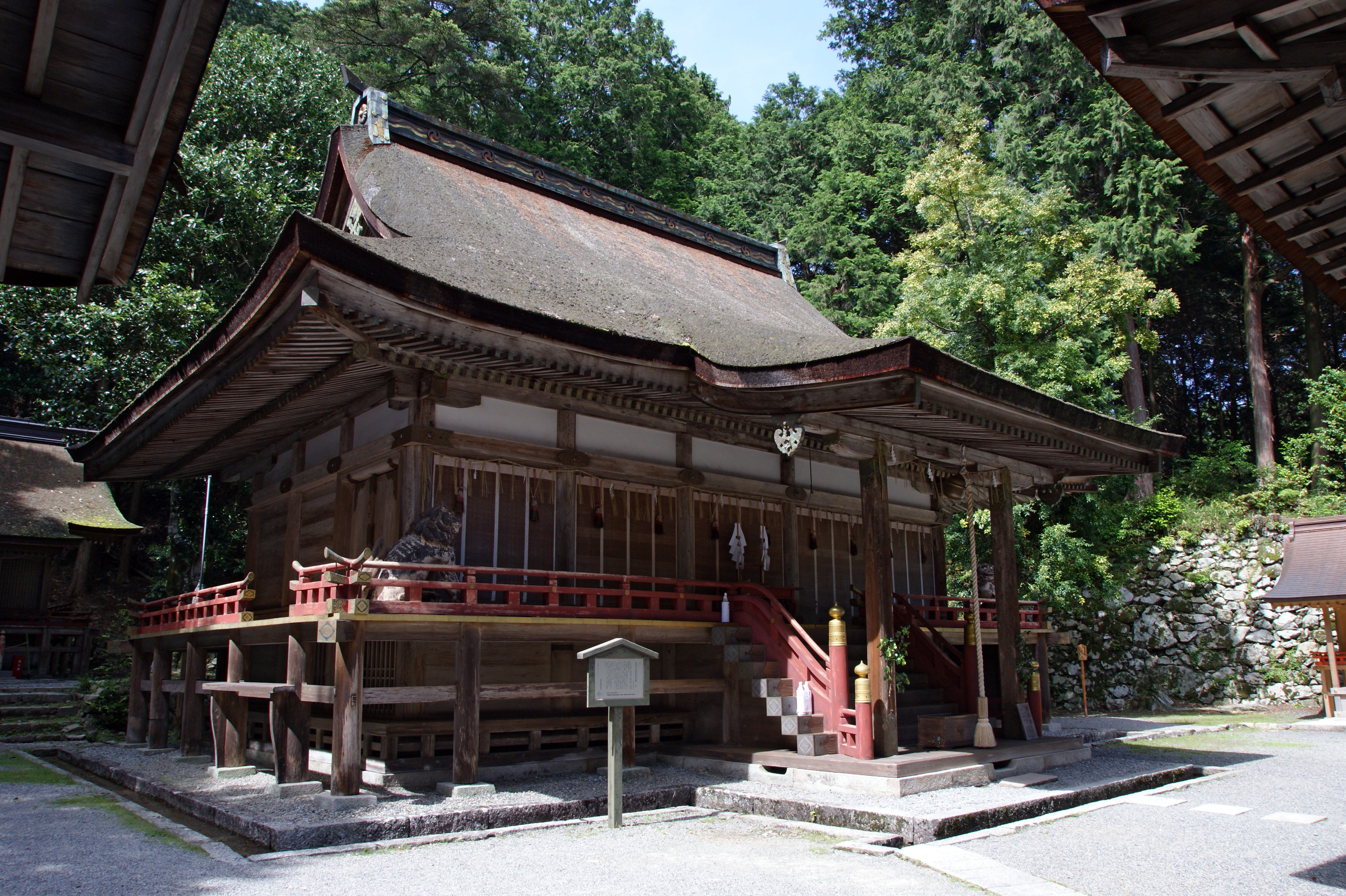
Hiyoshi Taisha's Higashi Hon-gū

Hiyoshi-zukuri or hie-zukuri (日吉造), also called shōtei-zukuri / shōtai-zukuri (聖帝造) or sannō-zukuri (山王造), is a rare Shinto shrine architectural style presently found in only three instances, all at Hiyoshi Taisha in Ōtsu, Shiga, hence the name. They are the East and West Honden Hon-gū (本殿本宮) and the Sessha Usa Jingū Honden (摂社宇佐神宮本殿).

It is characterized by a hip-and-gable roof with verandas called hisashi on the sides. It has a hirairi structure, that is, the building has its main entrance on the side which runs parallel to the roof's ridge (non gabled-side).

The building is composed of a 3x2 ken core called moya surrounded on three sides by a 1-ken wide hisashi, totaling 5x3 ken (see photo). The three-sided hisashi is unique and typical of this style. The gabled roof extends in small porticos on the front and the two gabled sides. The roof on the back has a characteristic shape (see photo below).

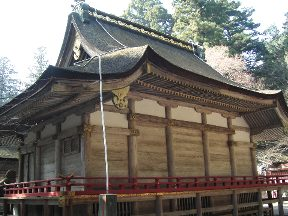
The typical shape of the back of a Hiyoshi-zukuri roof

== See also ==
- Glossary of Shinto
