= Hirairi =

Japanese traditional architectural structure

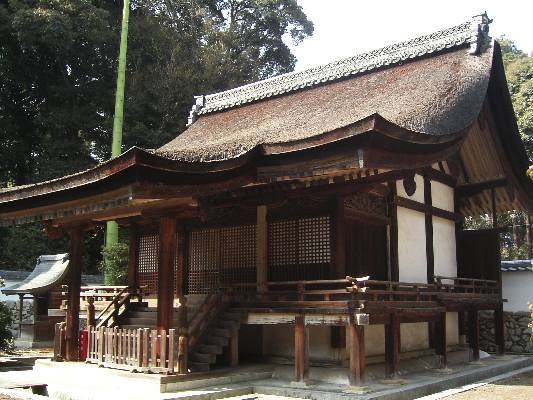
Hirairi style: the entrance is on the non-gabled side.

Hirairi or hirairi-zukuri (平入・平入造) is a Japanese traditional architectural structure, where the building has its main entrance on the side which runs parallel to the roof's ridge (non gabled-side). The shinmei-zukuri, nagare-zukuri, hachiman-zukuri, and hie-zukuri Shinto architectural styles belong to this type. It survives mostly in religious settings.

In residential buildings, the entrance side is usually the long one, but from the Edo period onward the opposite became more frequent.
