= Kamosu Shrine =

Shinto shrine in Shimane Prefecture, Japan

Kamosu Jinja 神魂神社
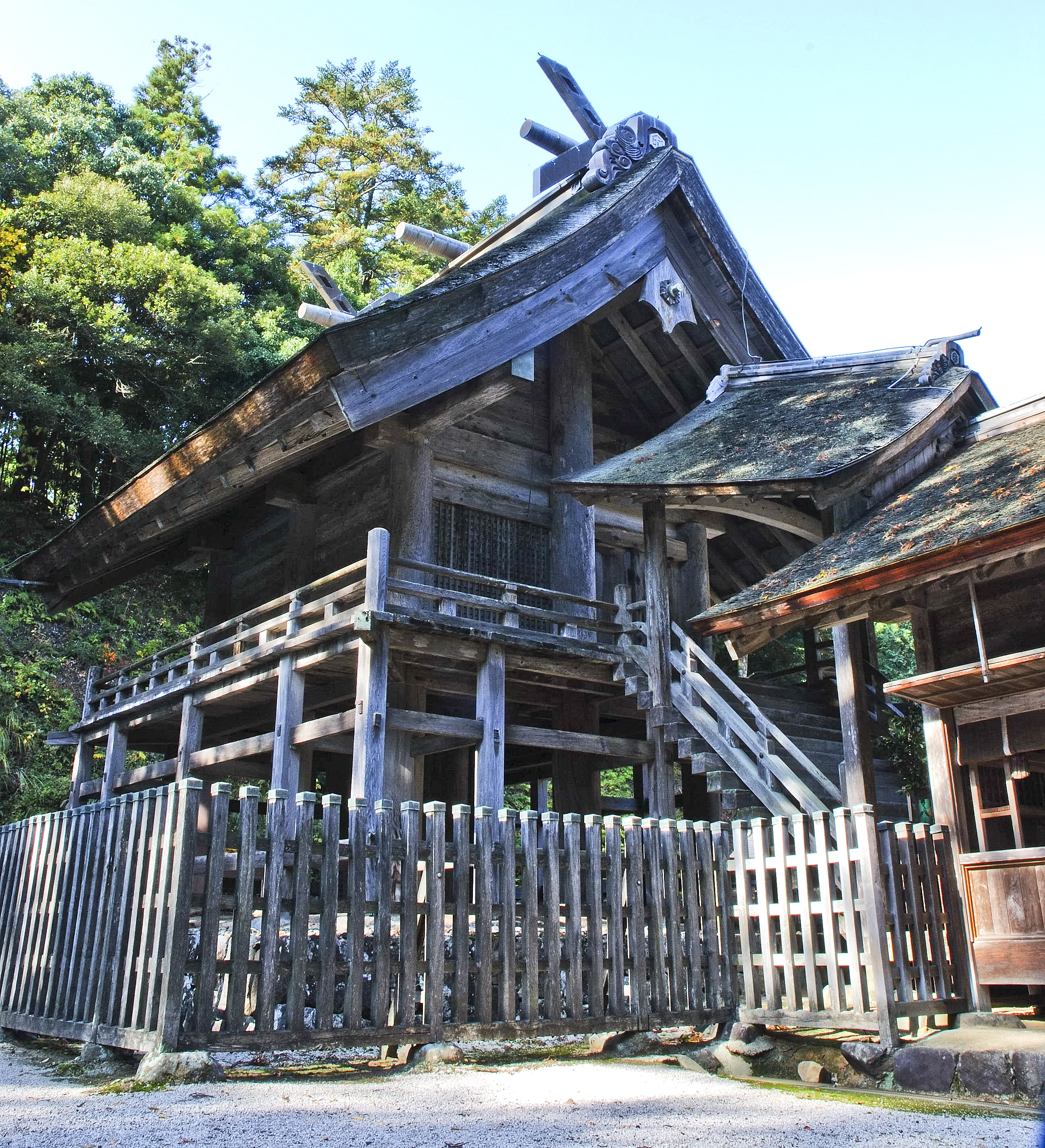
- Honden (1583), a National Treasure

- Location within Japan

Religion
- Affiliation: Shinto

Location
- Interactive map of Kamosu Jinja 神魂神社
- Coordinates: 35°25′32″N 133°05′04″E

Kamosu Jinja (神魂神社) is a Shinto shrine in Matsue, Shimane Prefecture, Japan. The Taisha-zukuri Honden of 1583 is a National Treasure. The coeval branch Inari shrine is an Important Cultural Property.

== See also ==
- List of National Treasures of Japan (shrines)
- Yaegaki Jinja
- Izumo Taisha
