= Heiden (Shinto) =

Offertory hall in shrine

In Shinto shrine architecture, a heiden (幣殿, offering hall) is the part within a Shinto shrine's compound used to house offerings. It normally consists of a connecting section linking the honden (sanctuary, closed to the public) to the haiden (oratory). In heiden, offerings (heihaku), consisting of strips of paper or silk or white and red clothing, are offered to the kami. The heihaku offered here evolved from the older practice of mitegura, cloth offerings tied to a ceremonial staff, and eventually developed into the gohei, a wand hung with zigzag paper strips (shide). The Engishiki's norito texts classify heihaku into clothing, weapons, sake (omiki), and food offerings (shinsen); this classification was later simplified to cloth offerings (yū and nigite) and the gohei itself. As a form of heihaku, the gohei is also considered a yorishiro endowed with strong purifying power, and has historically been used in rituals to exorcise epidemic disease.

If the shrine is built in the Ishi-no-ma-zukuri style, its stone pavement is lower than the floor of the other two rooms, and it is called ishi-no-ma (石の間, stone room), hence the name. It can also be called chūden (中殿) or in other ways, and its position can sometimes vary. In spite of its name, nowadays it is used mostly for rituals.

The size of the heiden also varies considerably and there are some exceptions regarding its location. For example, the Naikū heiden at Ise Shrine is located beyond the four walls that surround the sacred quarter.
