= Honden =

Main hall of a Shinto shrine

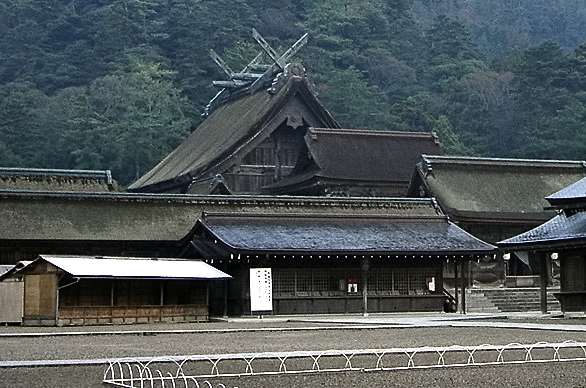
Izumo Taisha's honden, closed to the public

In Shinto shrine architecture, the honden (本殿, main hall), also called shinden (神殿), or sometimes shōden (昇殿) as in Ise Shrine's case, is the most sacred building at a Shinto shrine, intended purely for the use of the enshrined kami, usually symbolized by a mirror or sometimes by a statue. The building is normally in the rear of the shrine and closed to the general public. In front of it usually stands the haiden, or oratory. The haiden is often connected to the honden by a heiden, or hall of offerings.

== Overview ==
Physically, the honden is the heart of the shrine complex, connected to the rest of the shrine but usually raised above it, and protected from public access by a fence called tamagaki. It usually is relatively small and with a gabled roof. Its doors are usually kept closed, except at religious festivals. Shinto priests themselves enter only to perform rituals. The rite of opening those doors is itself an important part of the shrine's life. Inside the honden is kept the go-shintai (御神体), literally, "the sacred body of the kami", commonly a mirror, a sword, or a jewel, though it may also take the form of a carved image of the kami (shinzō), created under Buddhist influence in imitation of Buddhist statuary, or, more rarely, a mandala-style representation. The go-shintai is actually not divine, but just a temporary repository of the enshrined kami.

Important as it is, the honden may sometimes be completely absent, as for example when the shrine stands on a sacred mountain to which it is dedicated, or when there are nearby himorogi (enclosure) or other yorishiro (substitute object) that serve as a more direct bond to a kami. Ōmiwa Shrine in Nara, for example, contains no sacred images or objects because it is believed to serve the mountain on which it stands (Mount Miwa). For the same reason, it has a haiden (拝殿, worship hall), but no honden. In this sense, it is a model of what the first Shinto shrines were like.

Another important shrine without a honden is Suwa Taisha, head of the Suwa shrine network.

The honden's structure determines the shrine's architectural style. Many exist, but three (taisha-zukuri, shinmei-zukuri and sumiyoshi-zukuri) are of particular importance because they are the only ones believed to predate the arrival of Buddhism, and have therefore a special architectural and historical significance. They are exemplified respectively by the honden at Izumo Taisha, Nishina Shinmei Shrine and Sumiyoshi Taisha. German architect Bruno Taut compared the importance of Ise Shrine's honden to that of Greece's Parthenon.

== See also ==
- Glossary of Shinto for an explanation of terms concerning Shinto, Shinto art, and Shinto shrine architecture
- Holy of Holies in Judeo-Christian traditions
- Main Hall (Hondō) of a temple for the similar concept in Japanese Buddhism
