= Shinmei-zukuri =

Japanese architectural style

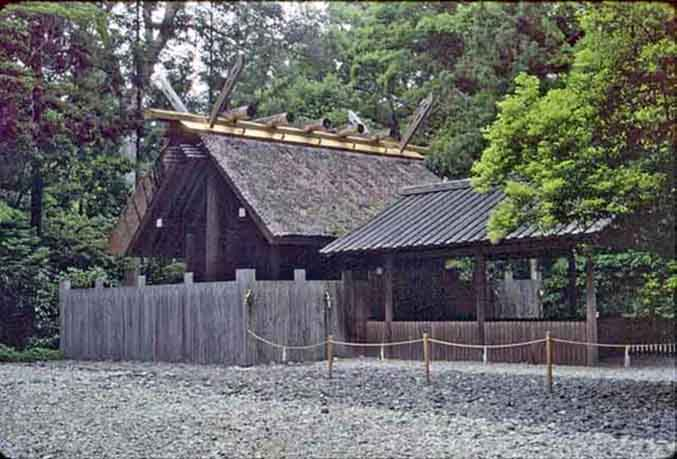
A building at Ise Shrine

Shinmei-zukuri (神明造) is an ancient Japanese architectural style typical of Ise Grand Shrine's honden, the holiest of Shinto shrines. It is most common in Mie Prefecture.

== History ==
Ancient shrines were constructed according to the style of dwellings (Izumo Taisha) or storehouses (Ise Grand Shrine). The buildings had gabled roofs, raised floors, plank walls, and were thatched with reed or covered with hinoki cypress bark. Such early shrines did not include a space for worship. Three important forms of ancient shrine architectural styles exist: taisha-zukuri, shinmei-zukuri, and sumiyoshi-zukuri They are exemplified by Izumo Taisha, Nishina Shinmei Shrine and Sumiyoshi Taisha, respectively, and date to before 552. According to the tradition of Shikinen sengū-sai (式年遷宮祭), the buildings or shrines were faithfully rebuilt at regular intervals adhering to the original design. In this manner, ancient styles have been replicated through the centuries to the present day.

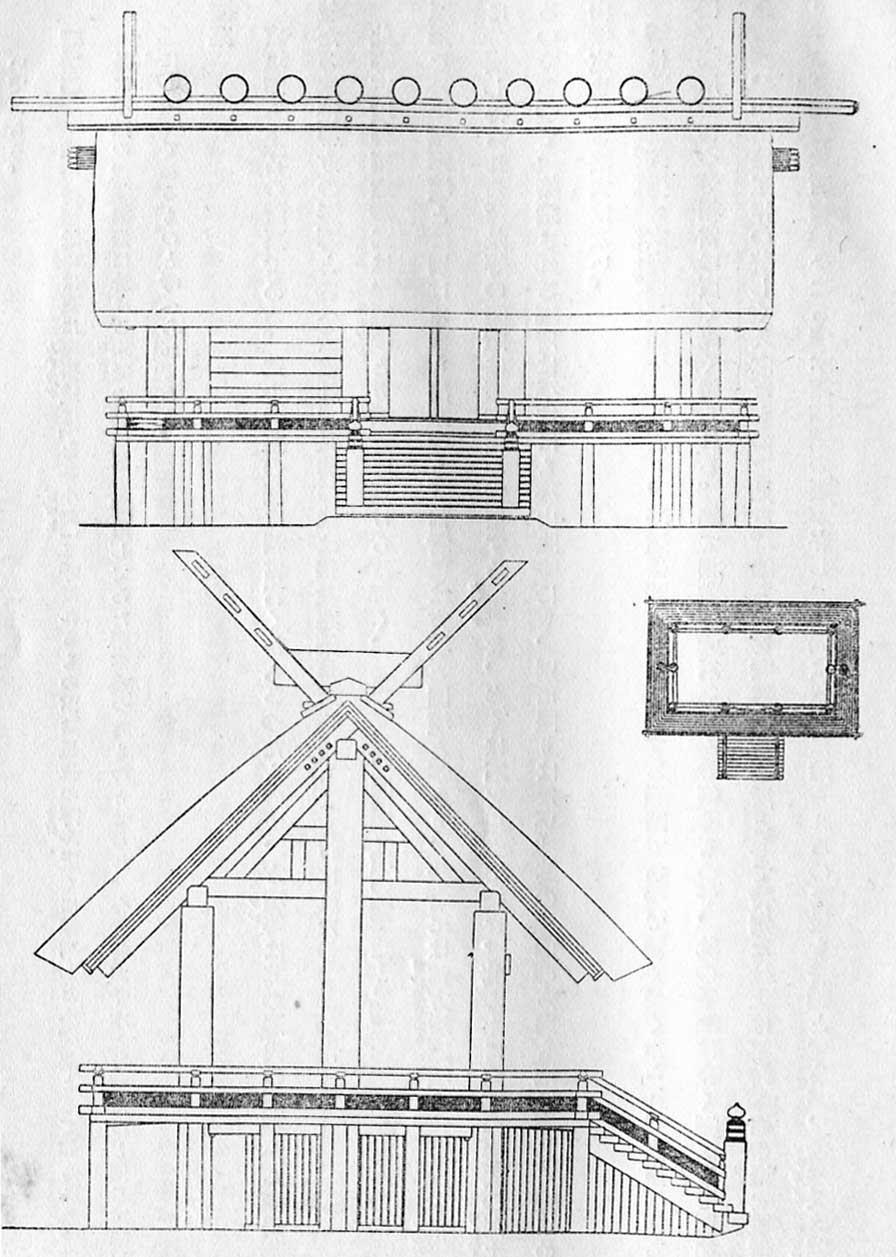
Ise Shrine's honden

== Structure ==
This style is characterized by an extreme simplicity. Its basic features can be seen in Japanese architecture from the Kofun period (250–538 CE) onwards and it is considered the pinnacle of Japanese traditional architecture. Built in plane-unfinished wood, the honden is either 3x2 ken or 1x1 ken in size, has a raised floor, a gabled roof with an entry on one of the non-gabled sides (hirairi or hirairi-zukuri (平入・平入造)), no upward curve at the eaves, and purely decorative logs called chigi (vertical) and katsuogi (horizontal) protruding from the roof's ridge.

Because shrines used to be rebuilt every 20 years, as Ise Shrine still is, shrines of this type are mostly of recent construction. The oldest extant example is Nishina Shinmei Shrine, which gives the name to the style.

== See also ==
- Austronesian architecture
