= Tsumairi =

Japanese traditional architectural structure

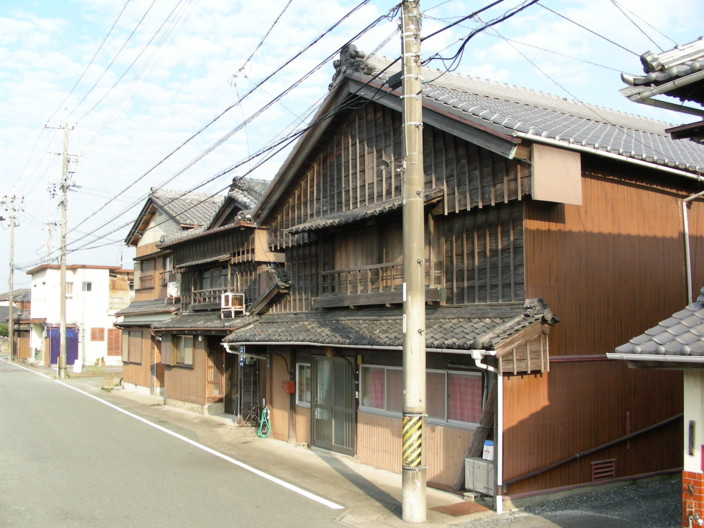
Tsumairi style: the entrance is on the gabled side.

Tsumairi or Tsumairi-zukuri (妻入・妻入造) is a Japanese traditional architectural structure where the building has its main entrance on one or both of the gabled sides (妻, tsuma). The kasuga-zukuri, taisha-zukuri, and sumiyoshi-zukuri Shinto architectural styles all belong to this type.
