= Taisha-zukuri =

Type of Shinto shrine

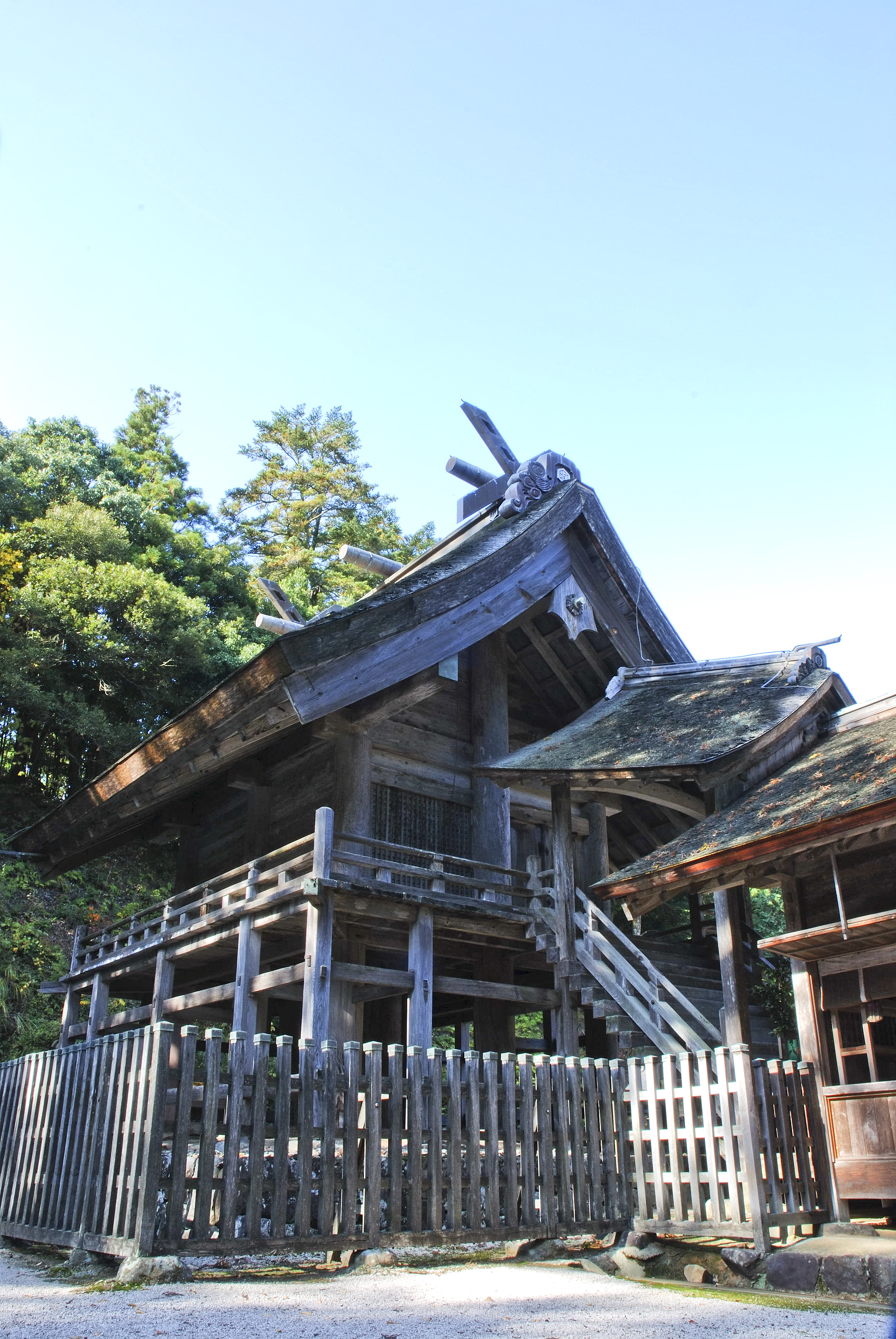

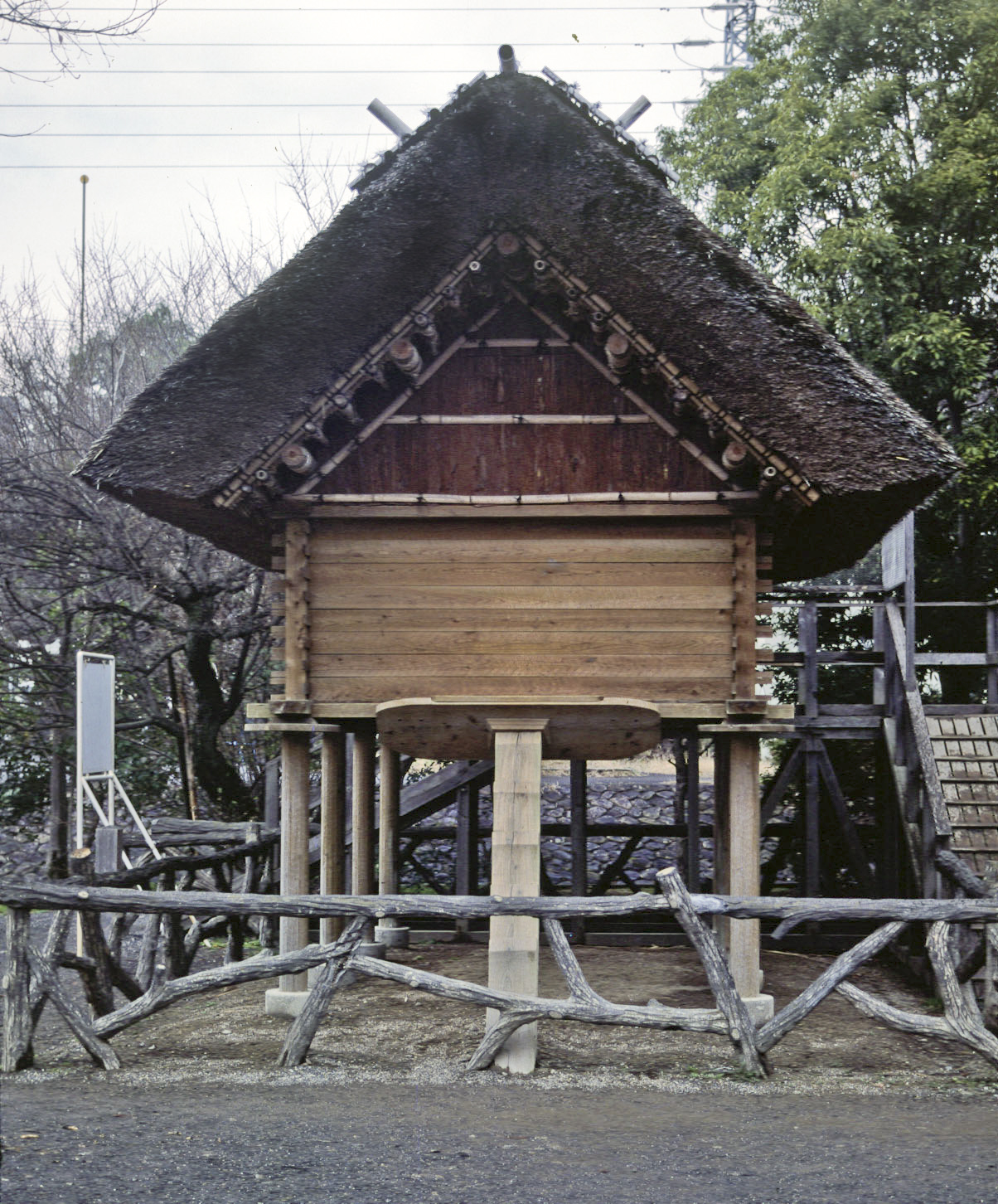

Kamosu Jinja's honden and a granary at Toro

Taisha-zukuri or Ōyashiro-zukuri (大社造) is an ancient Japanese architectural style and the oldest Shinto shrine architectural style. Named after Izumo Taisha's honden (sanctuary), like Ise Grand Shrine's shinmei-zukuri style it features a bark roof decorated with poles called chigi and katsuogi, plus archaic features like gable-end pillars and a single central pillar (shin no mihashira). The honden's floor is raised above the ground through the use of stilts (see photo). Like the shinmei-zukuri and sumiyoshi-zukuri styles, it predates the arrival of Buddhism in Japan.

== History ==
Ancient shrines were constructed according to the style of dwellings (Izumo Taisha) or storehouses (Ise Grand Shrine). The buildings had gabled roofs, raised floors, plank walls, and were thatched with reed or covered with hinoki cypress bark. Such early shrines did not include a space for worship. Three important forms of ancient shrine architectural styles exist: taisha-zukuri, shinmei-zukuri and sumiyoshi-zukuri. They are exemplified by Izumo Taisha, Nishina Shinmei Shrine and Sumiyoshi Taisha respectively and date to before 552. According to the tradition of Shikinen sengū-sai (式年遷宮祭), the buildings or shrines were faithfully rebuilt at regular intervals adhering to the original design. In this manner, ancient styles have been replicated through the centuries to the present day.

== Structure ==
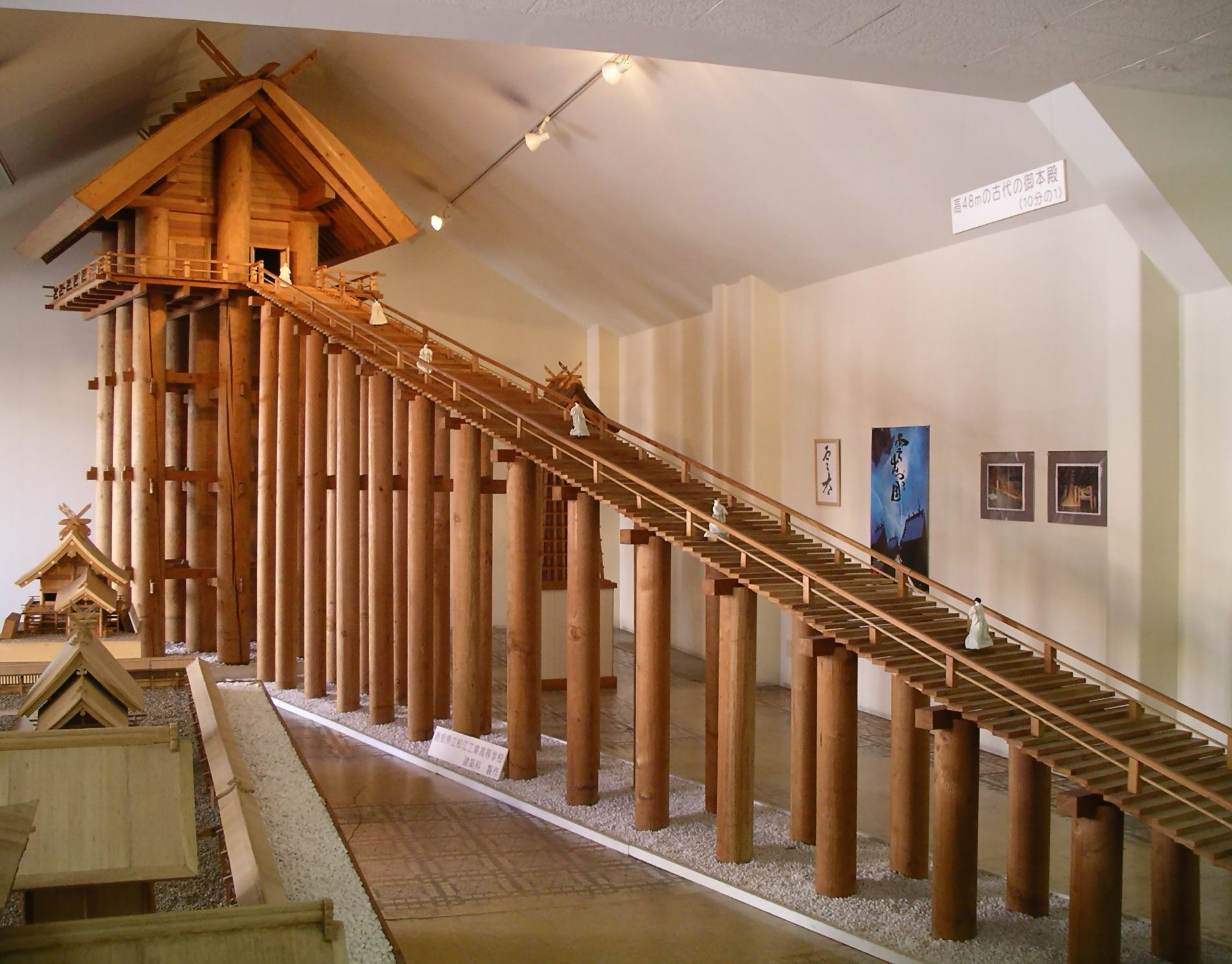
Reconstruction model of the ancient Izumo-taisha honden, based on remains of old pillars found on the site.

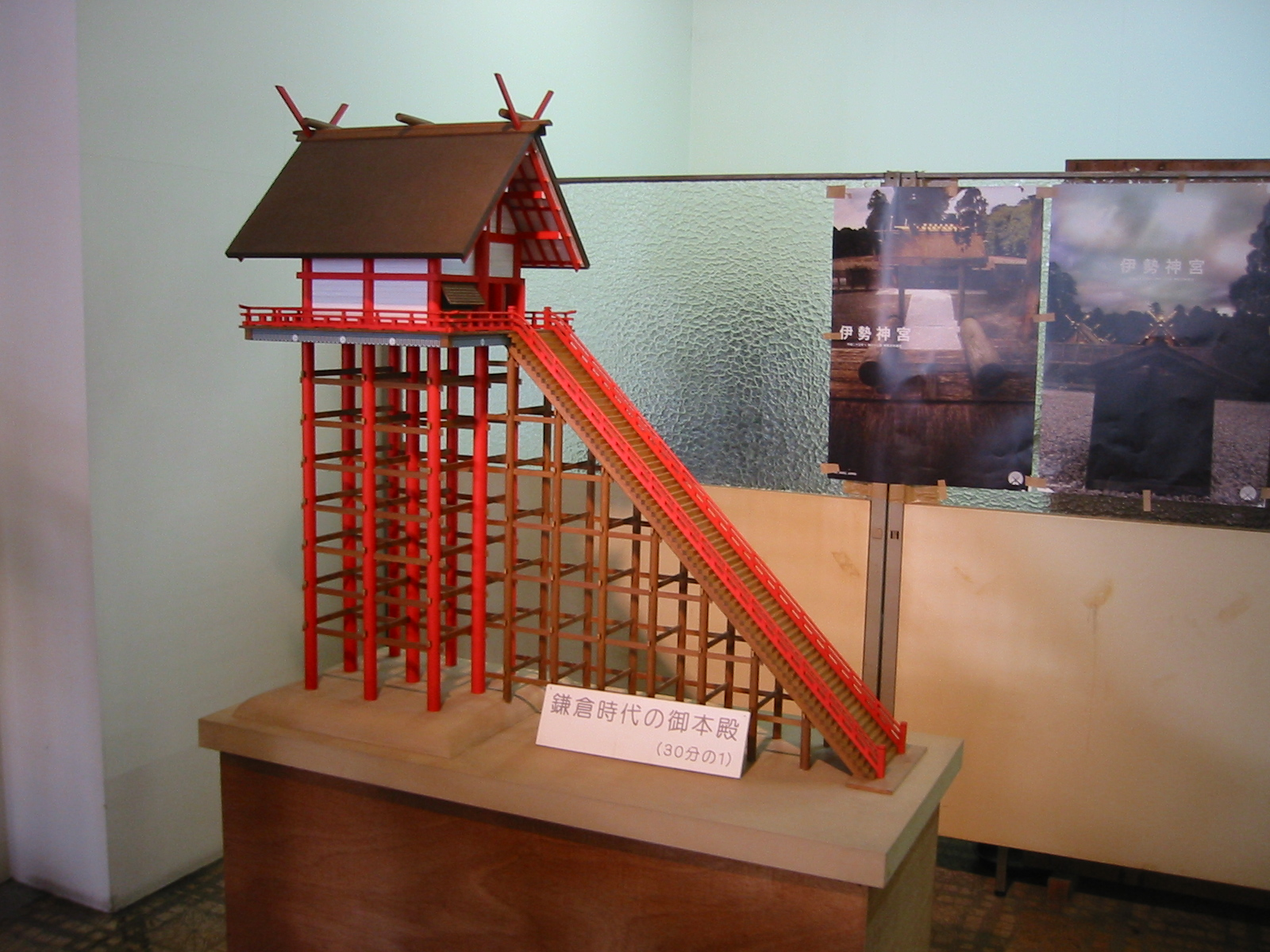
Reconstruction of Izumo Taisha's honden somewhat later, during the Kamakura period

Izumo Taisha's honden over time has gone through profound changes that have greatly decreased its size and changed its structure. In its present form, it is a gabled building 2x2 ken in size, with an entrance on the gabled end (a characteristic called tsumairi-zukuri (妻入造). Like Ise Grand Shrine's, it has purely ornamental poles called chigi (vertical) and katsuogi (horizontal) on a cypress bark-covered roof, plus archaic features like gable-end pillars and a single central pillar (shin no mihashira (心の御柱)). This pillar has a diameter of 10.9 cm, has no obvious structural role and is believed to have had a purely religious significance. The external stairway is covered by an independent bark-covered roof (see illustration in the gallery).

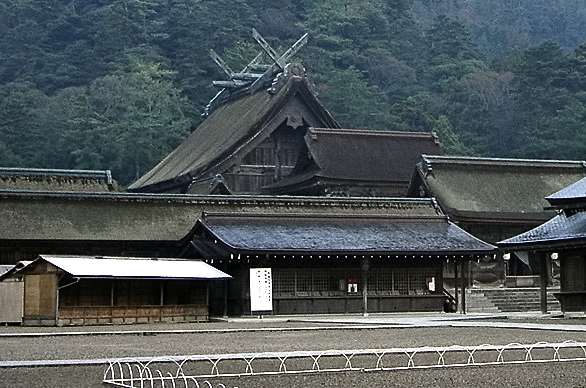
Izumo Taisha's honden

The honden's interior is a square divided into four identical sections, each covered by fifteen tatami (straw mats). The floor plan has therefore the shape of the Chinese character for rice field (田), an element which suggests a possible connection with harvest propitiation rites.

Because its floor is raised above the ground, the honden is believed to have its origin in raised-floor granaries like those found in Toro, Shizuoka prefecture.

The oldest extant example of taisha-zukuri is the honden at Kamosu Shrine in Matsue, Shimane prefecture, built in 1582 and now declared a National Treasure. Smaller than Izumo Taisha's, it nonetheless has thick supporting pillars. It is deeper, has a higher floor, and differs significantly from Izumo Taisha's. It probably represents an older style of construction.

== Gallery ==
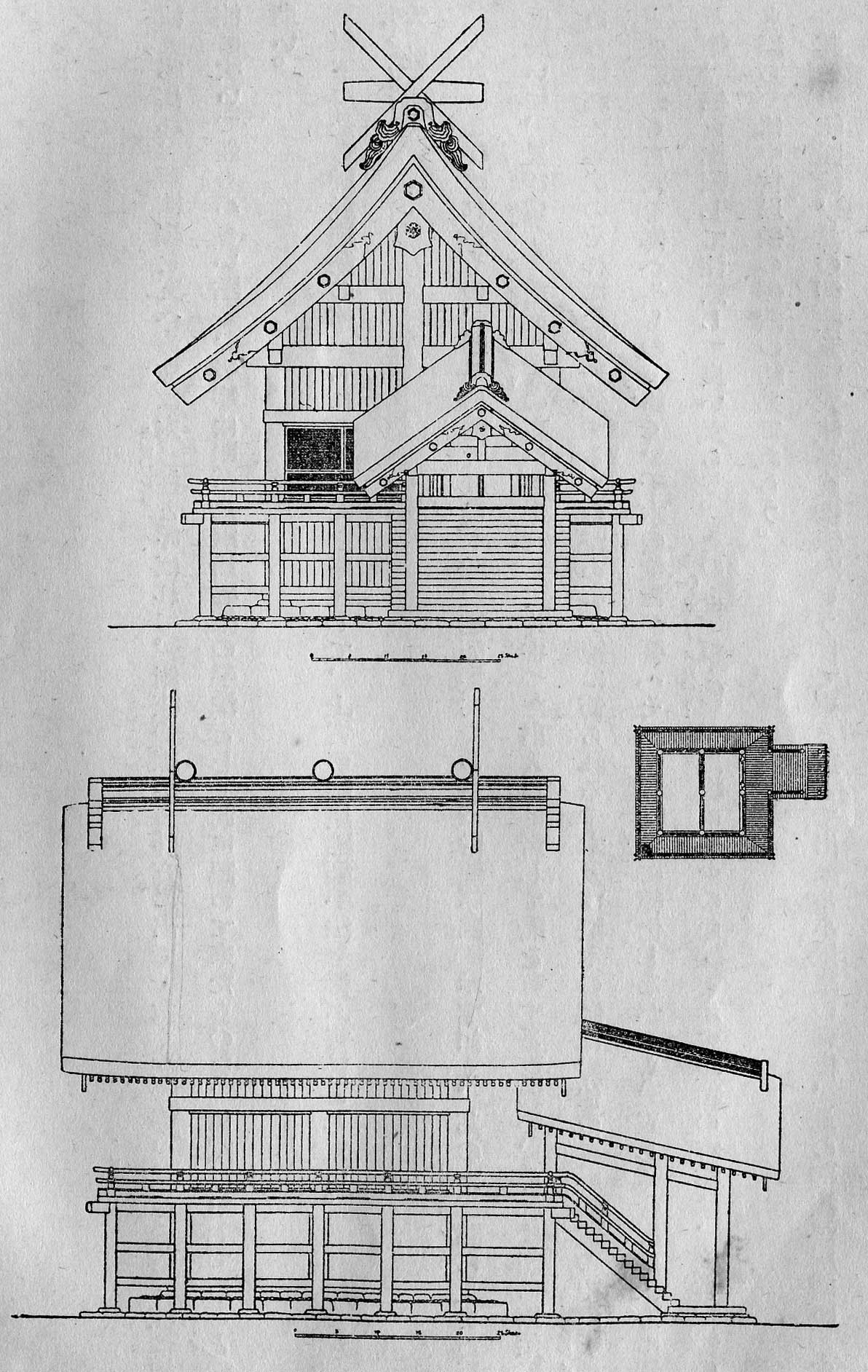
Front and side view of Izumo Taisha's honden

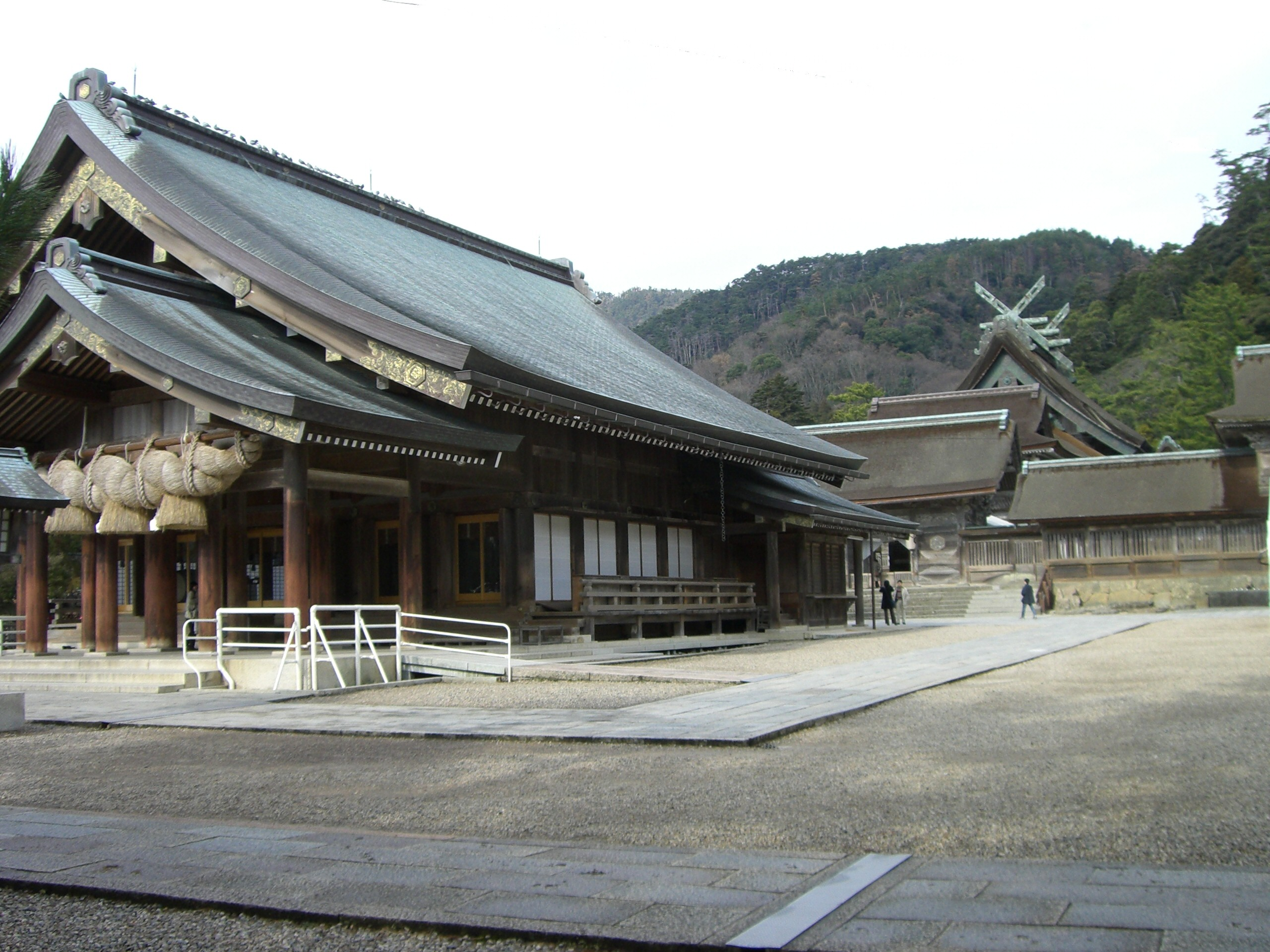
The honden is visible in the background.

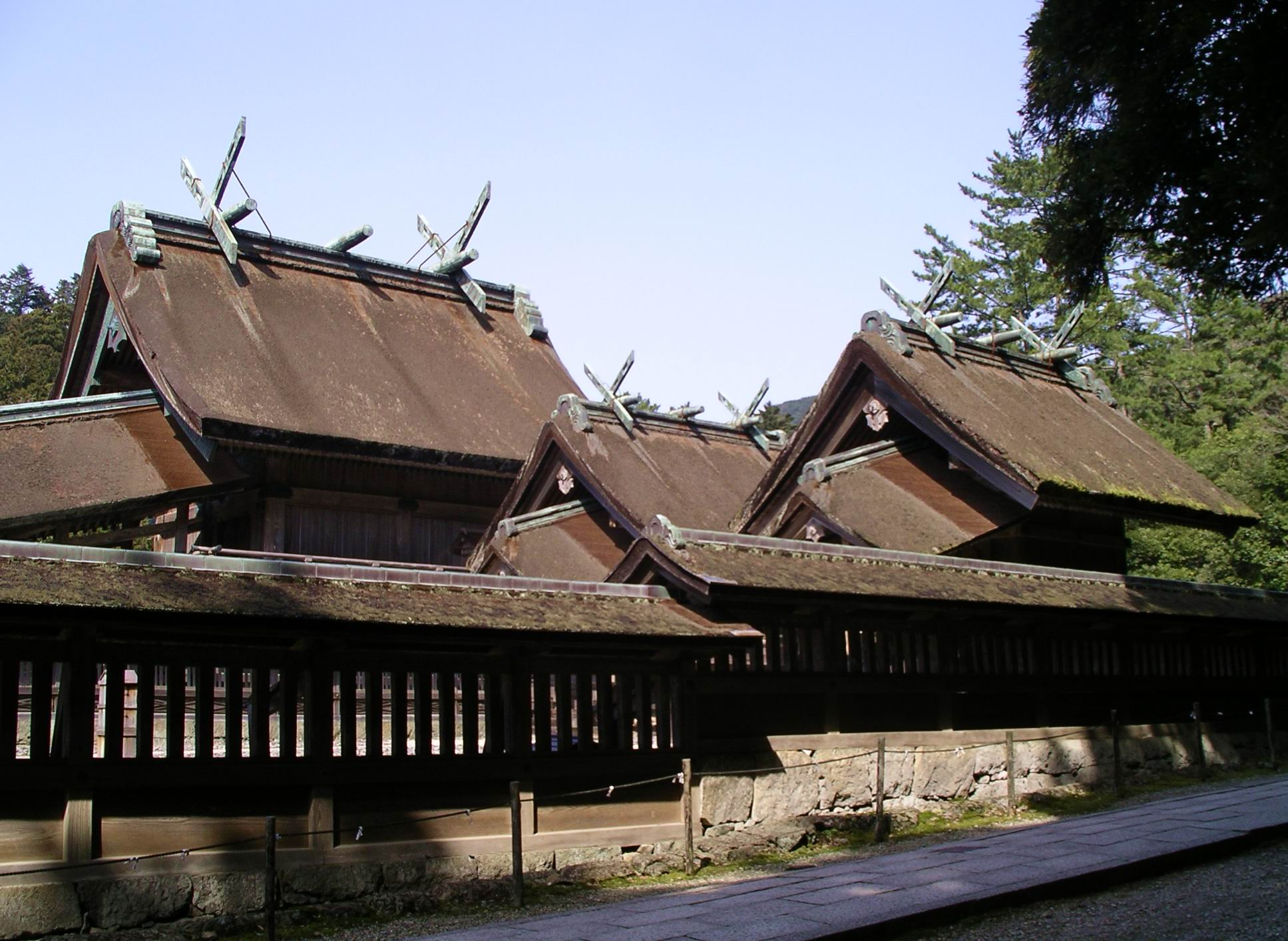
Roofs at Izumo Taisha
