= Chigi (architecture) =

Forked roof finials in Shinto architecture

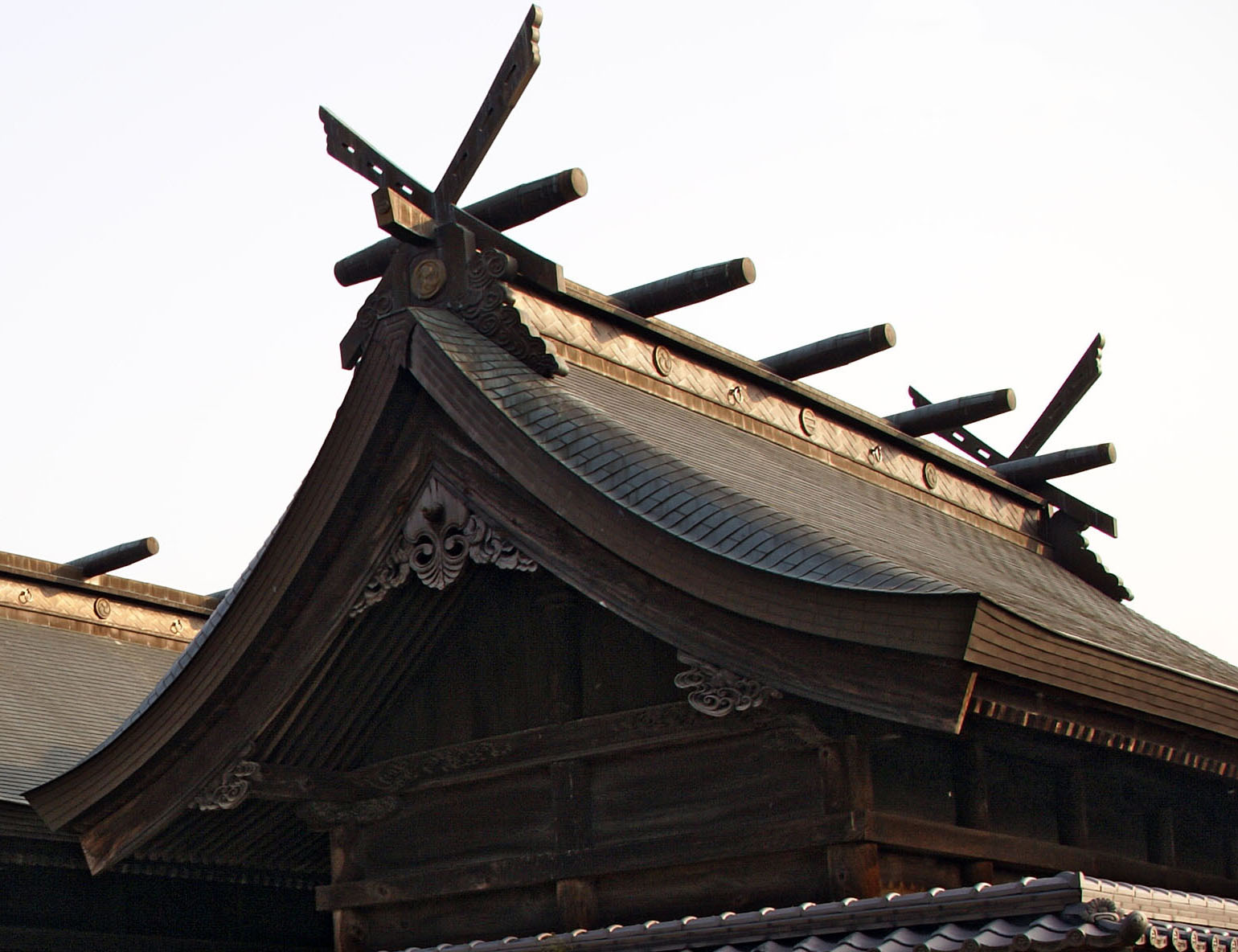
Chigi with katsuogi billets, Sumiyoshi-jinja, Hyōgo

Chigi (千木, 鎮木, 知木, 知疑), Okichigi (置千木) or Higi (氷木) are forked roof finials found in Japanese and Shinto architecture. Chigi predate Buddhist influence and are an architectural element endemic to Japan. They are an important aesthetic aspect of Shinto shrines, where they are often paired with katsuogi, another type of roof ornamentation. Today, chigi and katsuogi are used exclusively on Shinto buildings and distinguish them from other religious structures, such as Buddhist temples in Japan.

== Origin ==
Chigi are thought to have been employed on Japanese buildings starting from the 1st century AD. Their existence during the Kofun period (250–538 AD) is well documented by numerous artifacts. Measurements for chigi were mentioned in an early document, the Taishinpō Enryaku Gishikichō (太神宝延暦儀式帳), written in 804 AD.

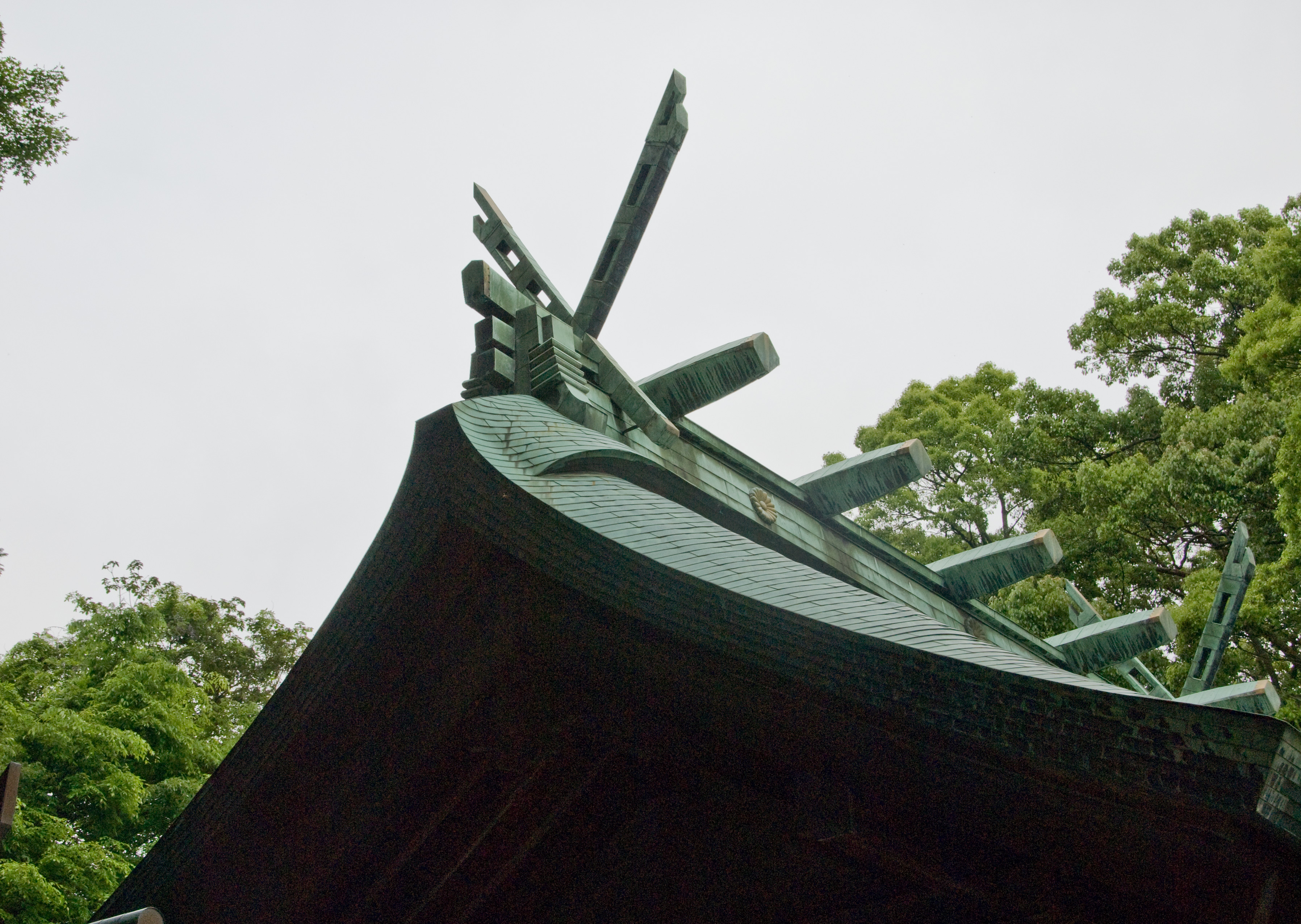
Kamakura-gū

The evolutionary origins of the chigi are not known. One theory is that they were simply interlocking bargeboard planks that were left uncut. Another is that they were part of a support system anchored on the ground to stabilize the roof. Yet another theory proposes that they were used to "pinch" and hold thatch roofing together. Evidence of this can be seen in minka, or common traditional homes, where two interlocking timbers are often found at the roof gables. However, the only certain fact is that chigi were originally a working part of the structure, but as building techniques improved, their function was lost and they were left as decorations.

Chigi were likely only to have decorated the homes and warehouses of powerful families, and more decorations signified higher rank. This tradition continued until relatively recent times. In the 17th to 19th centuries, the legal code dictated how many chigi were allowed on building roofs in accordance with the owner's social rank. Today, chigi are found only on Shinto shrines.

== Design ==
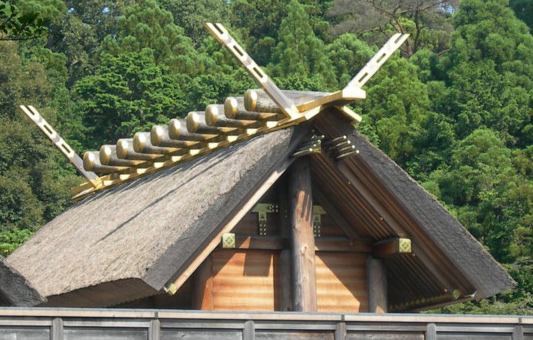
Bargeboard chigi at Ise Shrine

Chigi may be built directly into the roof as part of the structure, or simply attached and crossed over the gable as an ornament. The former method is believed to closer resemble its original design, and is still used in older building methods such as shinmei-zukuri, kasuga-zukuri, and taisha-zukuri. Chigi that are not built into the building are crossed, and sometimes cut with a slight curve. While chigi are predominantly placed only at the ends of the roof, this method allows them to sometimes be placed in the middle as well.

More ornate chigi, such as at Ise Shrine, are cut with one or two kaza-ana, or "wind-slots", and a third open cut at the tip, giving it a forked appearance. Gold metal coverings serve both protective and ornamental purposes. Usually, if the tops are cut vertically, the enshrined kami is a male, otherwise a female.

The katsuogi, a short decorative log, is often found behind the chigi. Depending on the building, there may be only one katsuogi accompanying the chigi, or an entire row along the ridge of the roof.

The angle at which the chigi faces and the number of katsuogi the building contains are used to identify the gender of the kami enshrined within. Upward-facing, with an even number of katsuogi indicate a female kami. Outward-facing chigi, with an odd number of katsuogi indicate a male kami. This is not a hard and fast rule, as there are exceptions (such as the shrines in Ise Grand Shrine.)

== Names ==
Names for chigi can vary from region. In Kyoto, Nara Prefecture, and Hiroshima, they are called uma (馬). In parts of Toyama, Osaka, Kōchi, Tokushima and Miyazaki prefectures, they are called umanori (馬乗); in some areas of Yamagata, Miyagi, Yamanashi, Hiroshima and Kōchi prefectures, they are called kurakake (鞍掛).

== Gallery ==
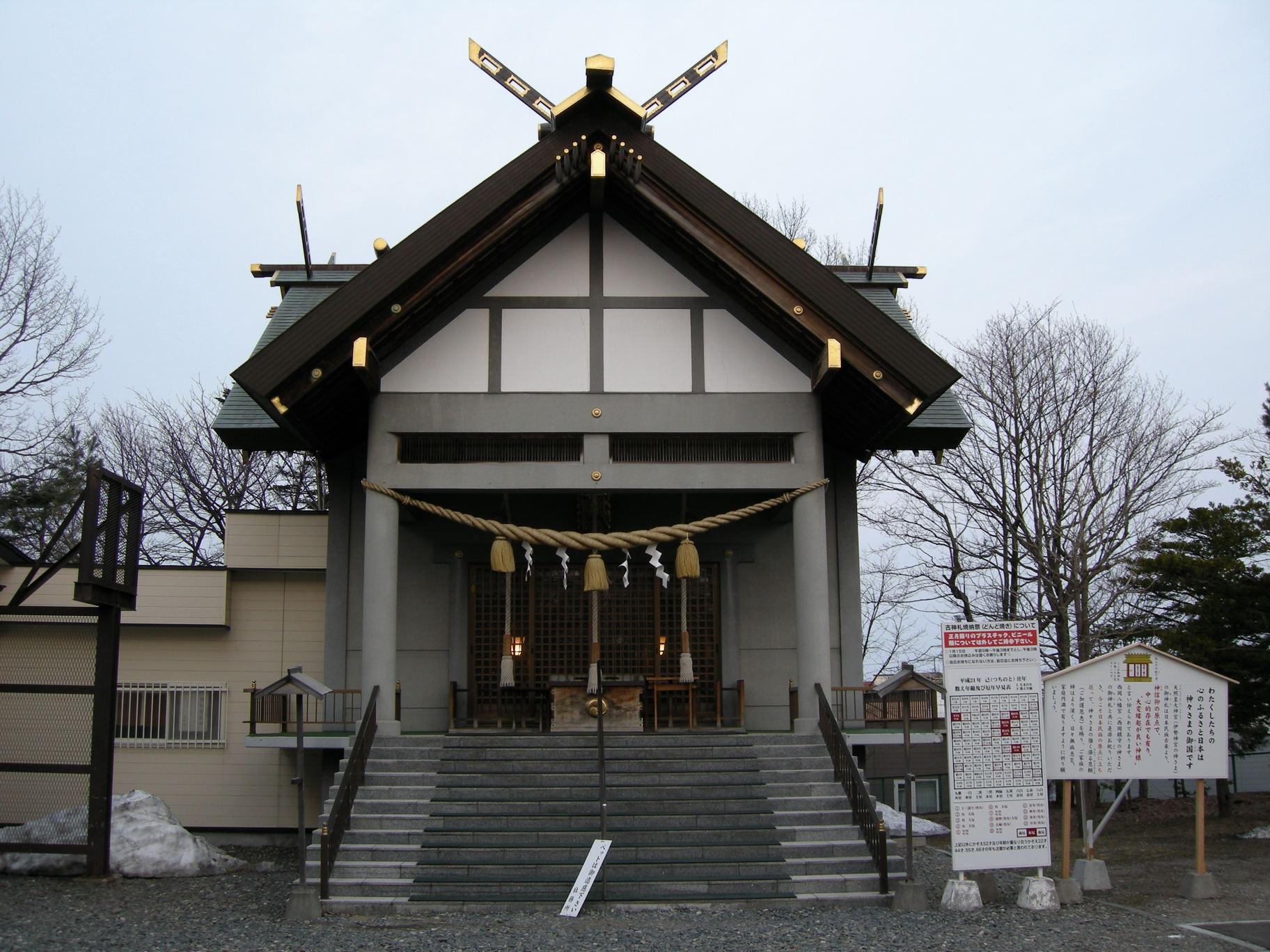
Nishioka Hachiman-gū

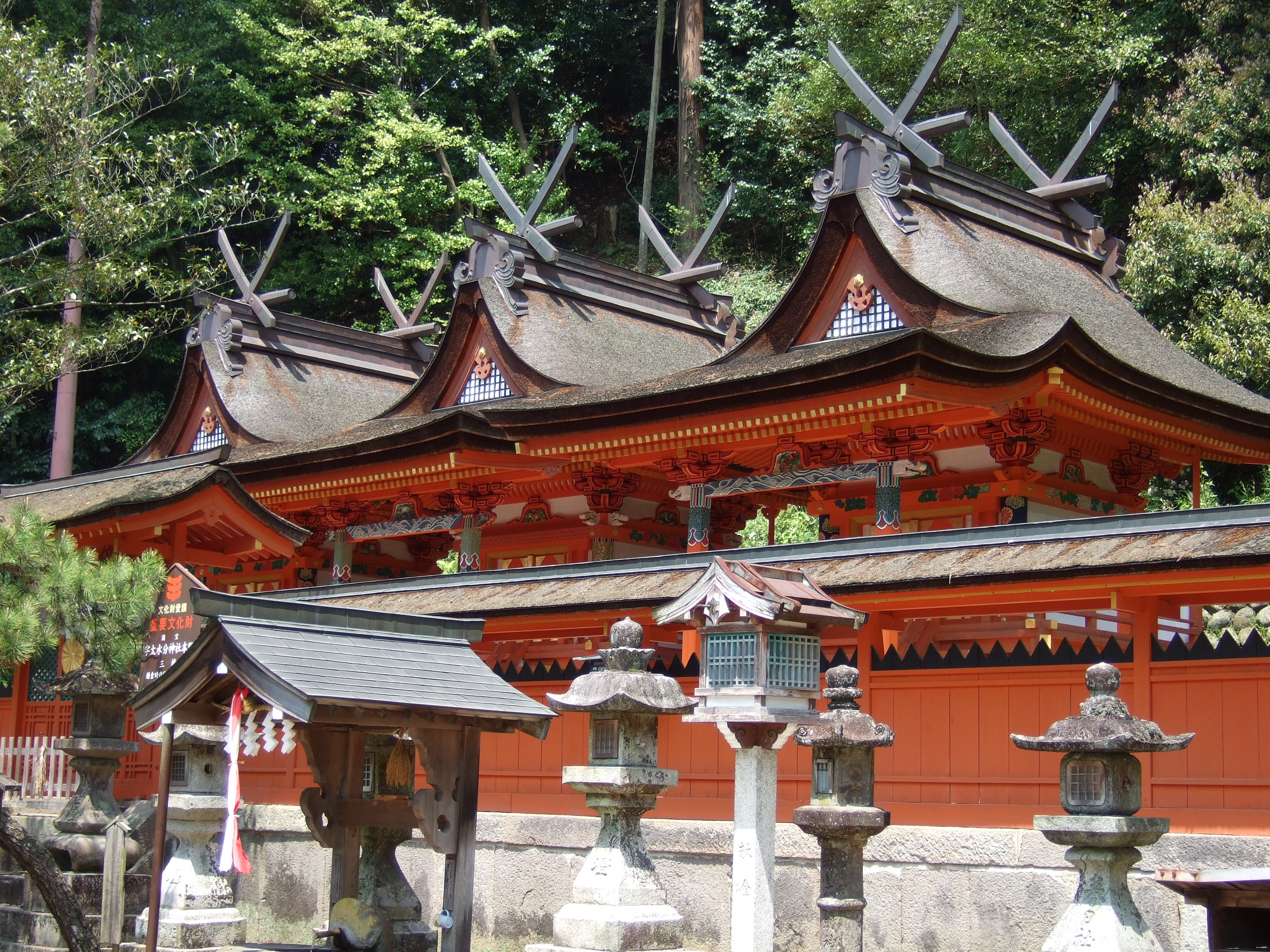
Prominent chigi at Udamikumari Shrine

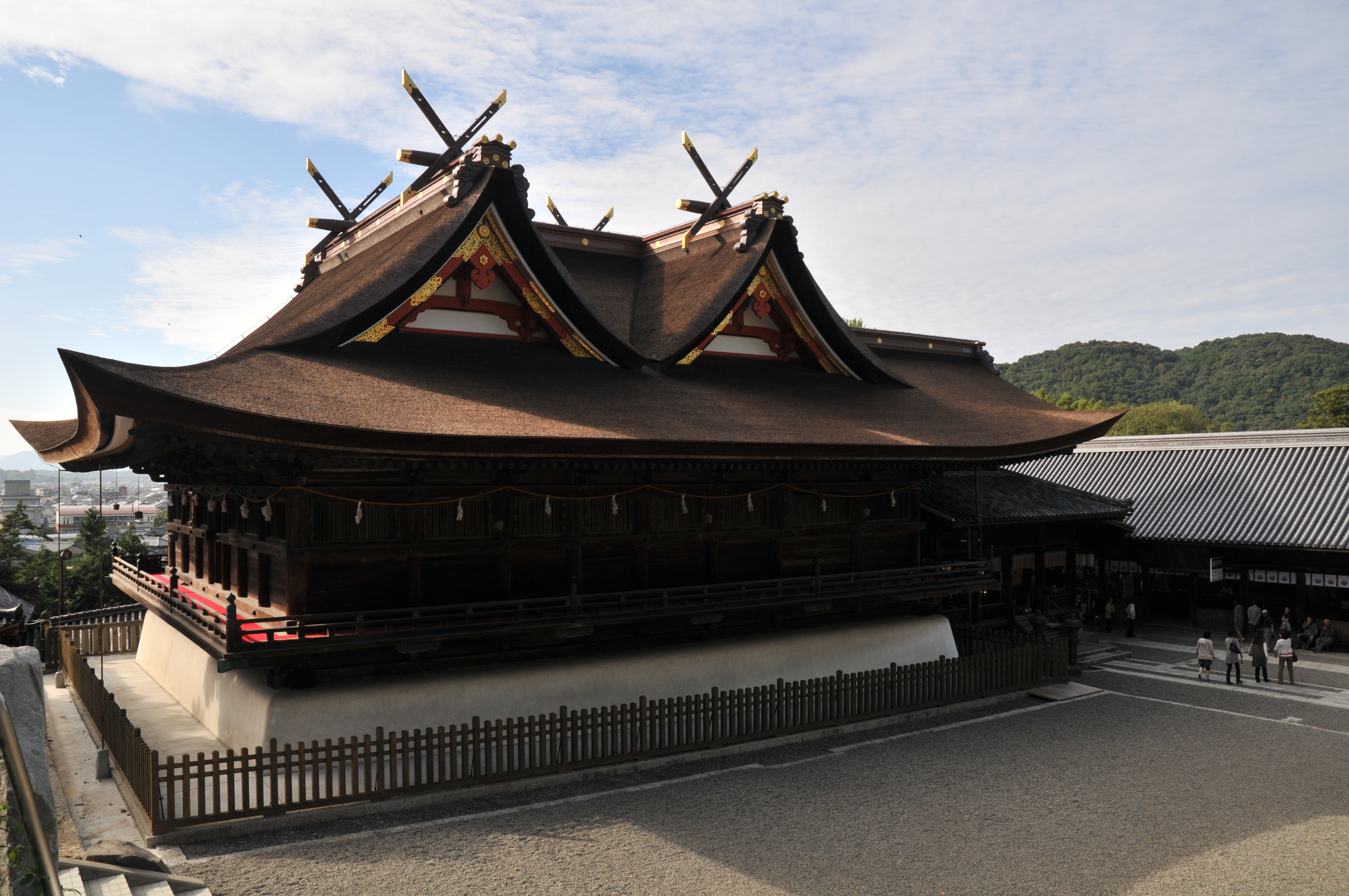
The Honden of Kibitsu Shrine

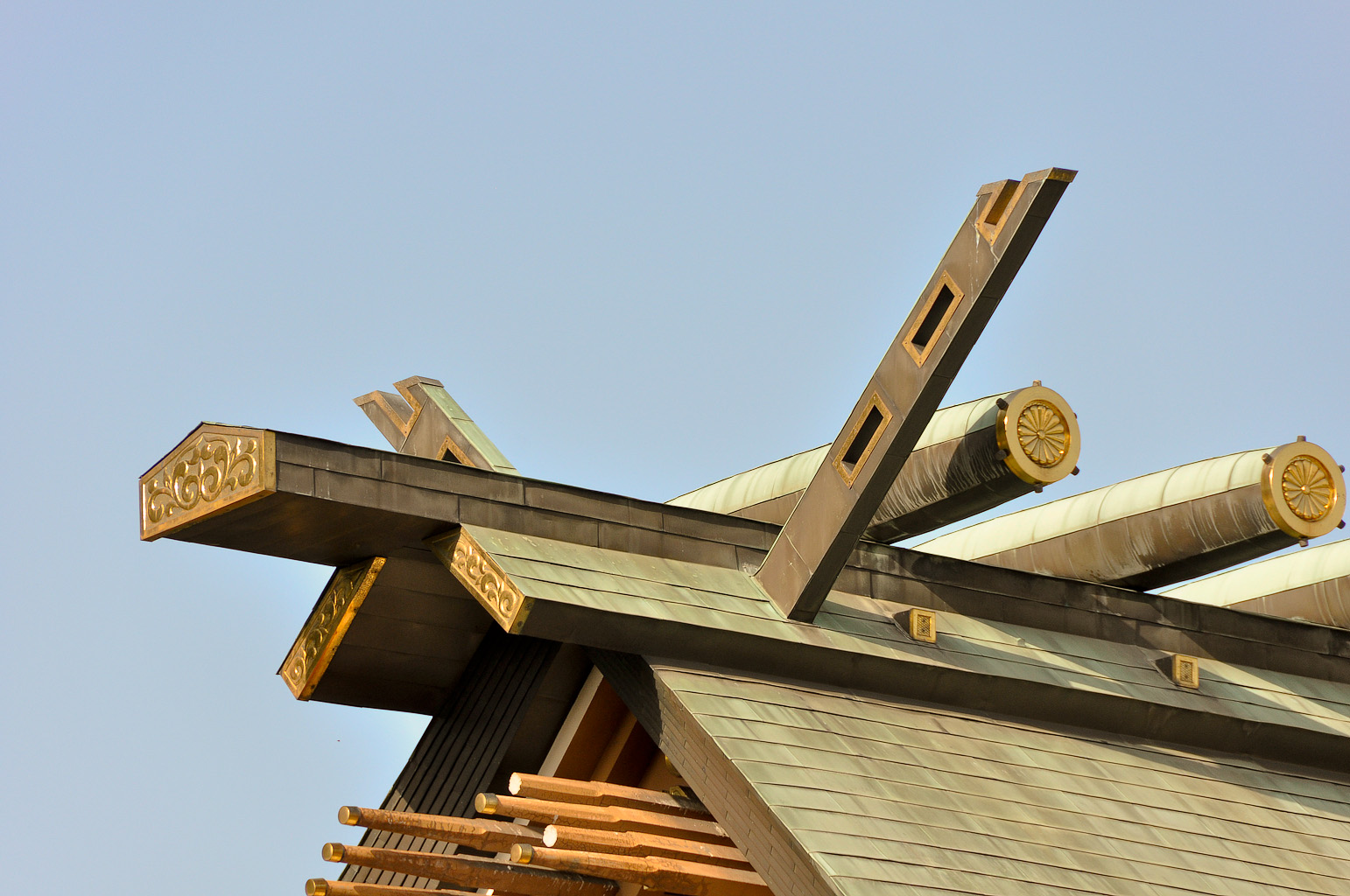
Chigi built in the shinmei-zukuri style

== See also ==
- Glossary of Shinto for terms concerning Shinto and Shinto architecture.
