= Shinto architecture =

Architecture of Japanese Shinto shrines

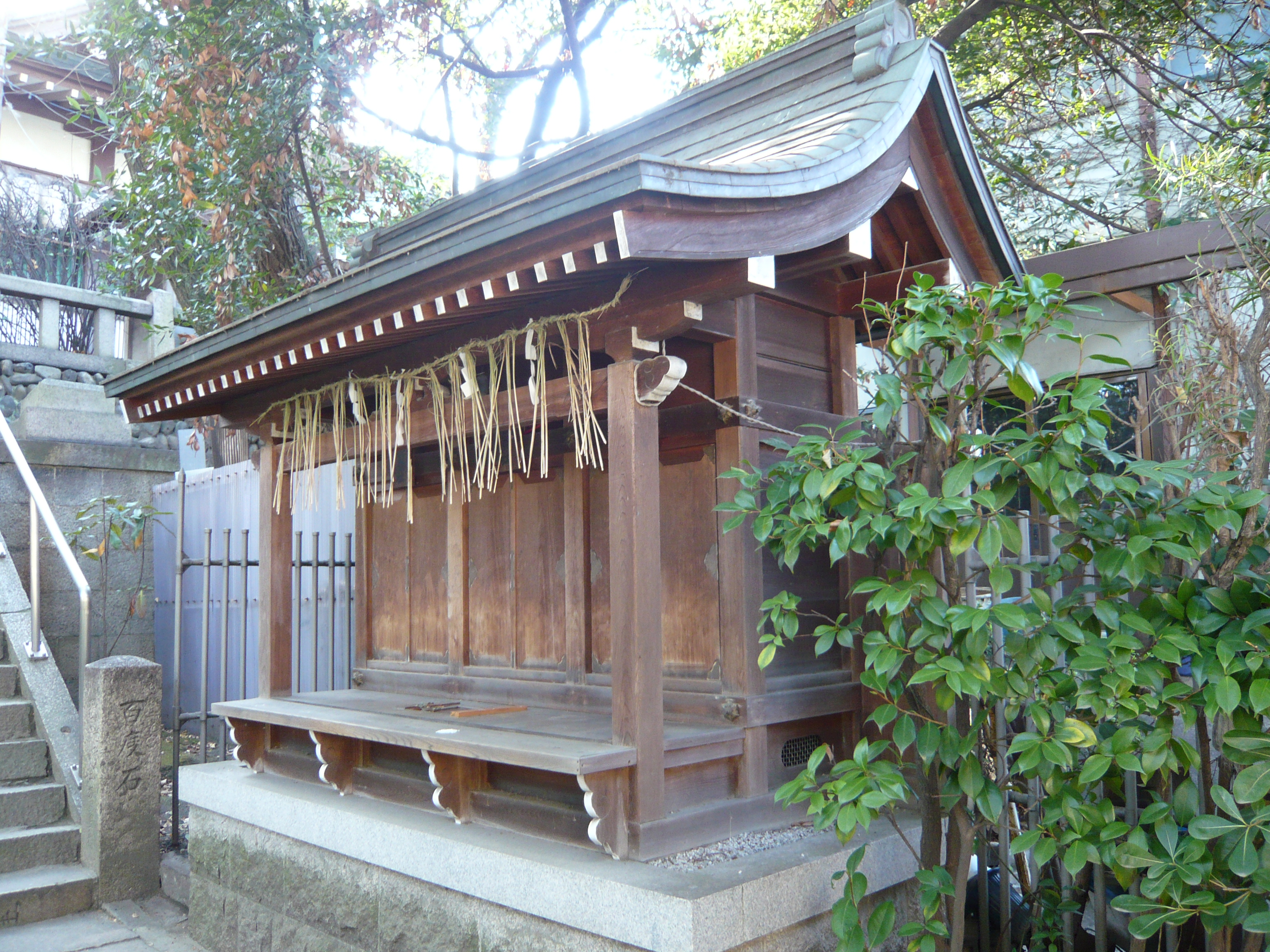

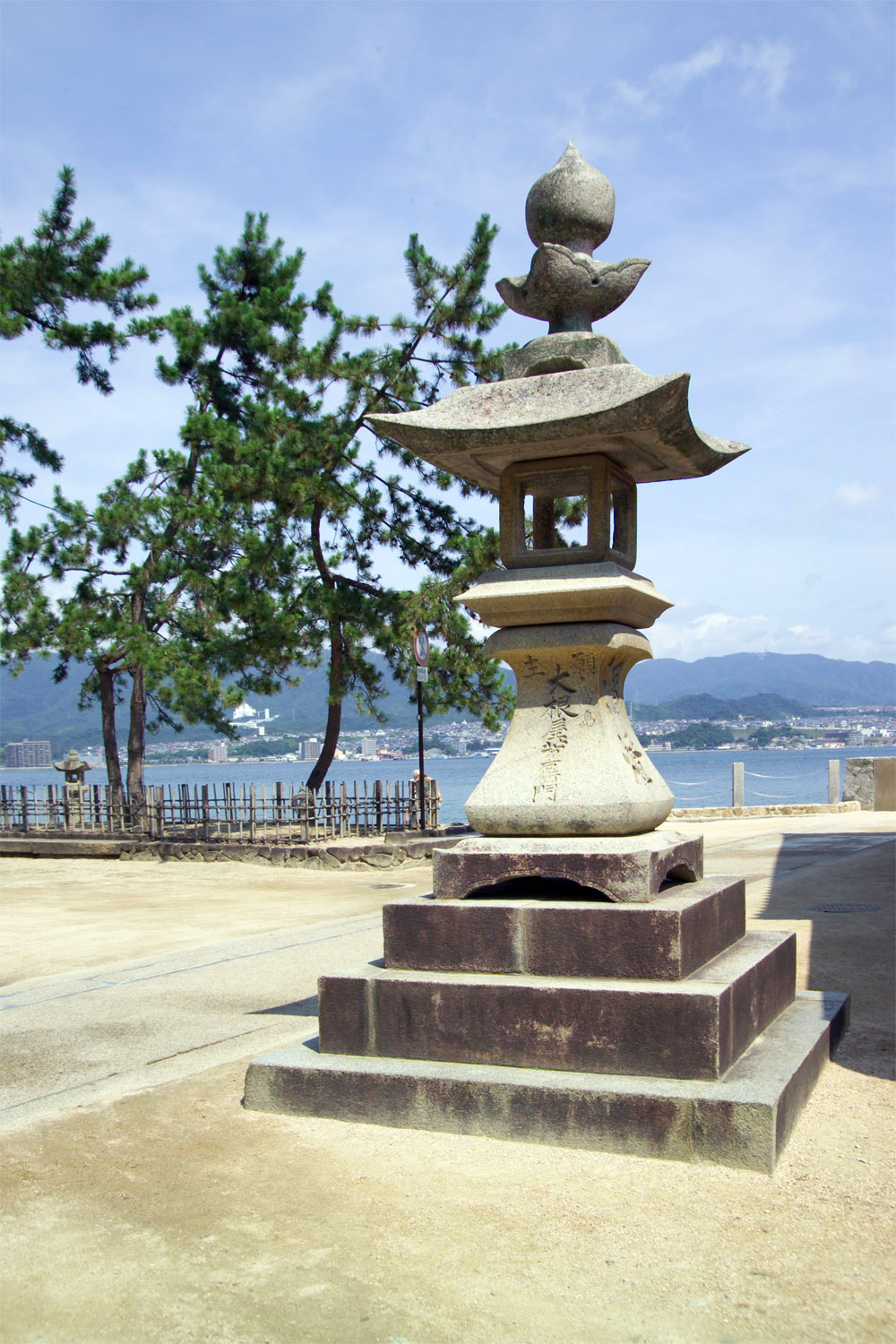

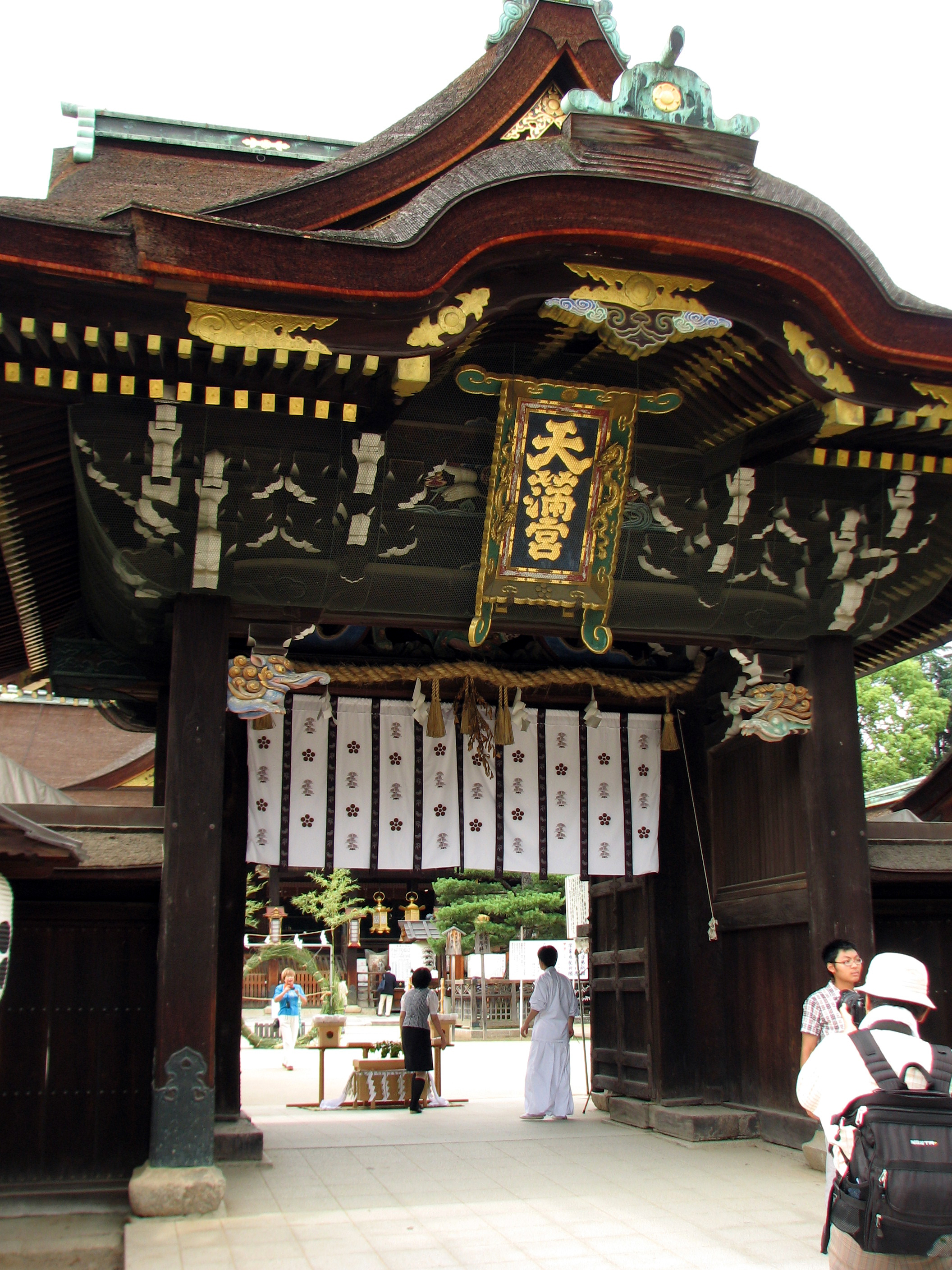

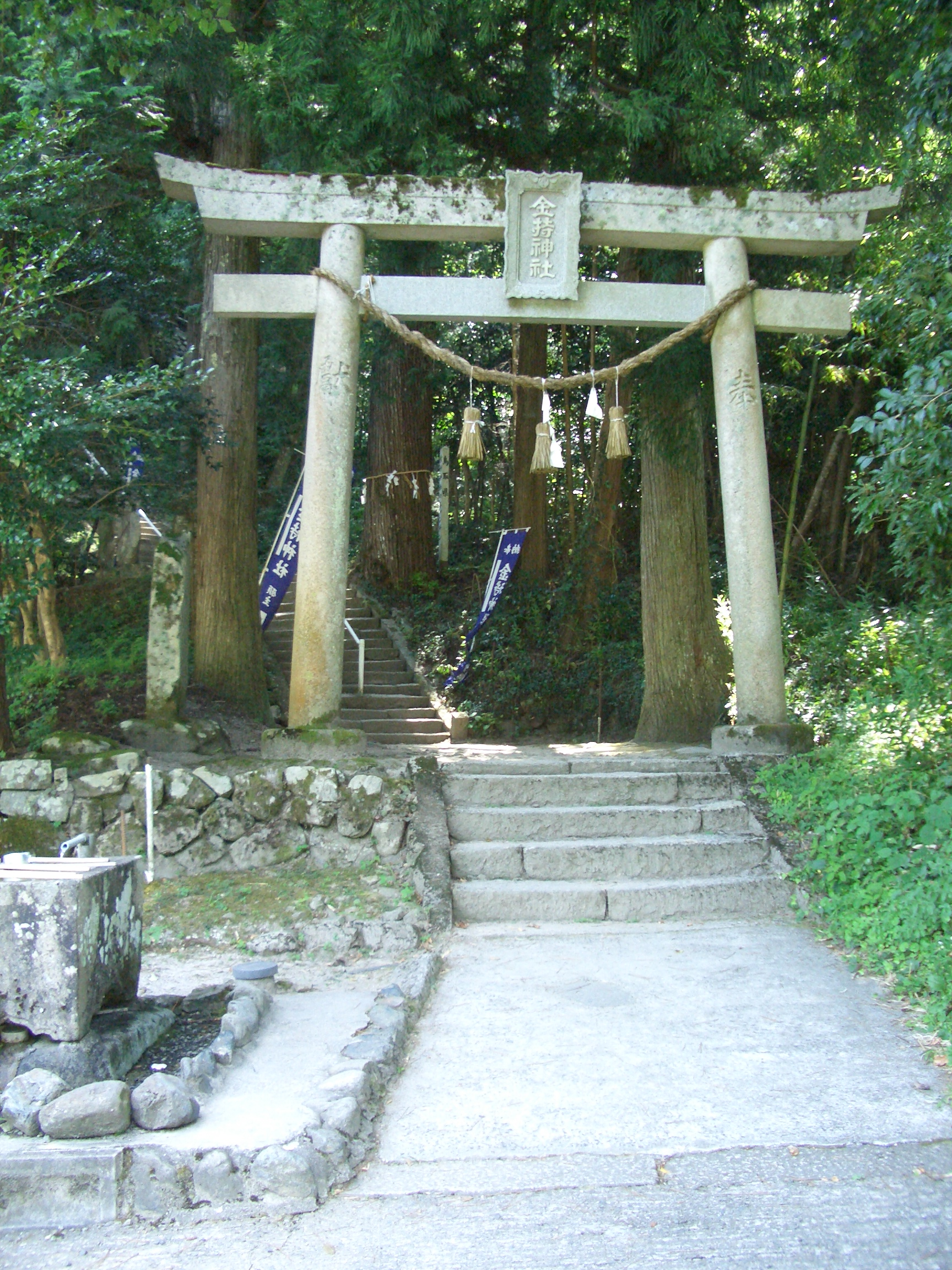

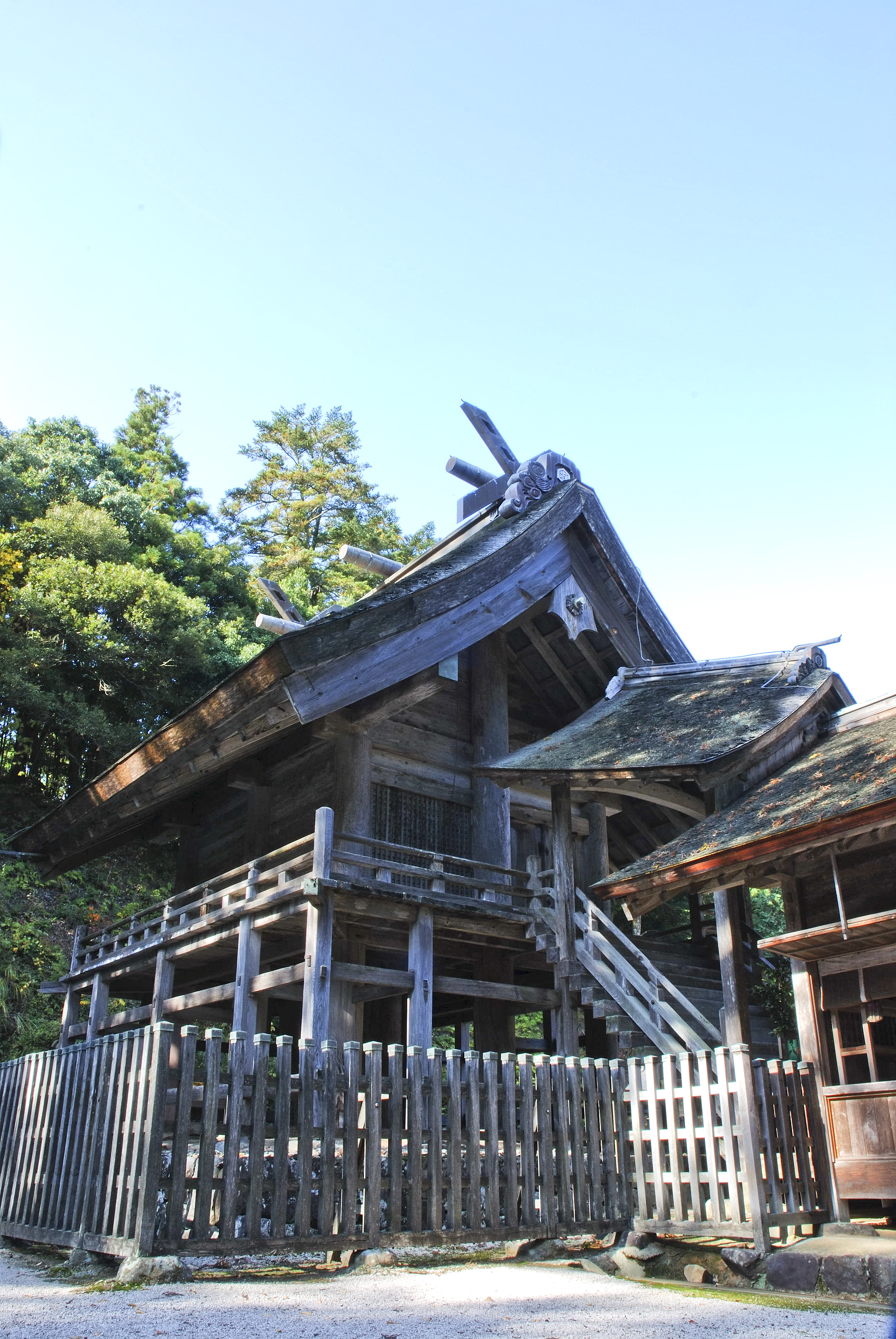

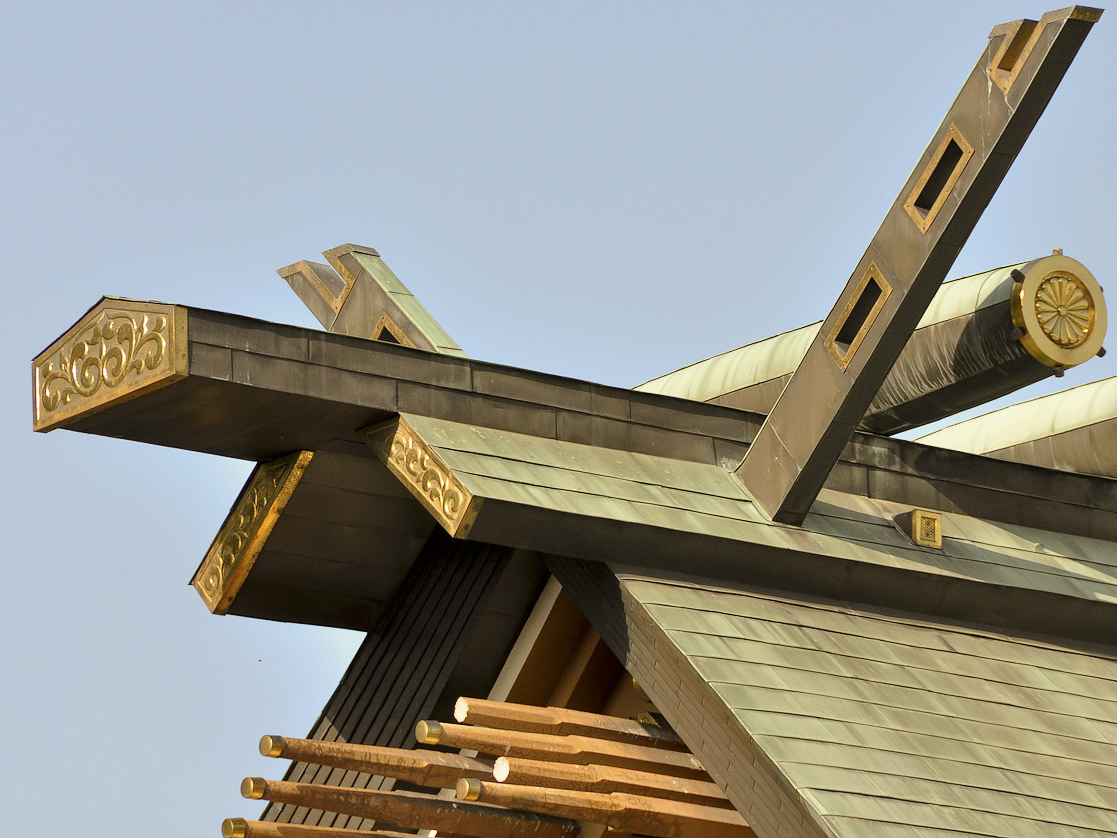

Some examples of Shinto architecture

Shinto architecture is the architecture of Japanese Shinto shrines.

With a few exceptions like Ise Grand Shrine and Izumo Taisha, Shinto shrines before Buddhism were mostly temporary structures erected to a particular purpose. Buddhism brought to Japan the idea of permanent shrines and the presence of verandas, stone lanterns, and elaborate gates are some which are used both in a Shinto shrine and a Buddhist temple.

The composition of a Shinto shrine is extremely variable, and none of its possible features are necessarily present. Even the honden or sanctuary, the part which houses the kami and which is the centerpiece of a shrine, can be missing. However, since its grounds are sacred, they usually are surrounded by a fence made of stone or wood called tamagaki, while access is made possible by an approach called sandō. The entrances themselves are straddled by gates called torii, which are therefore the simplest way to identify a Shinto shrine.

A shrine may include within its grounds several structures, each destined to a different purpose. Among them are the honden or sanctuary, where the kami are enshrined, the heiden, or hall of offerings, where offers and prayers are presented, and the haiden or hall of worship, where there may be seats for worshipers. The honden is the building that contains the shintai, literally, "the sacred body of the kami". Of these, only the haiden is open to the laity. The honden is located behind the haiden and is usually much smaller and unadorned. Other notable shrine features are the temizuya, the fountain where visitors cleanse their hands and mouth and the shamusho (社務所), the office that supervises the shrine. Shrines can be very large, as for example Ise Shrine, or as small as a beehive, as in the case of the hokora, small shrines frequently found on road sides.

Before the forced separation of Shinto and Buddhism (Shinbutsu bunri), it was not uncommon for a Buddhist temple to be built inside or next to a shrine or to the contrary for a shrine to include Buddhist subtemples (Shinbutsu shūgō). If a shrine was also a Buddhist temple, it was called a jingu-ji. At the same time, temples in the entire country adopted tutelary kami (chinju (鎮守/鎮主) and built temple shrines called chinjusha to house them. After the forcible separation of Buddhist temples and Shinto shrines (shinbutsu bunri) ordered by the new government in the Meiji period, the connection between the two religions was officially severed, but continued nonetheless in practice.

== The origin of shrines ==
The practice of marking sacred areas began in Japan as early as the Yayoi period (from about 500 BC to 300 AD) originating from primal Shinto tenets. Features in the landscape such as rocks, waterfalls, islands, and especially mountains, were places believed to be capable of attracting kami, and subsequently were worshiped as yorishiro. Originally, sacred places may have been simply marked with a surrounding fence and an entrance gate or torii. Later, temporary buildings similar to present day portable shrines were constructed to welcome the gods to the sacred place. Over time the temporary structures evolved into permanent structures that were dedicated to the gods. Ancient shrines were constructed according to the style of dwellings (Izumo Taisha) or storehouses (Ise Grand Shrine). The buildings had gabled roofs, raised floors, plank walls, and were thatched with reed or covered with hinoki cypress bark. Such early shrines did not include a space for worship. Three important forms of ancient shrine architectural styles exist: taisha-zukuri, shinmei-zukuri, and sumiyoshi-zukuri. They are exemplified by Izumo Taisha, Nishina Shinmei Shrine and Sumiyoshi Taisha respectively and date to before 552. According to the tradition of Shikinen sengū-sai (式年遷宮祭), the buildings or shrines were faithfully rebuilt at regular intervals adhering to the original design. In this manner, ancient styles have been replicated through the centuries to the present day. (Note: Presently only the Ise Grand Shrine is being rebuilt every 20 years.)

== Common features ==
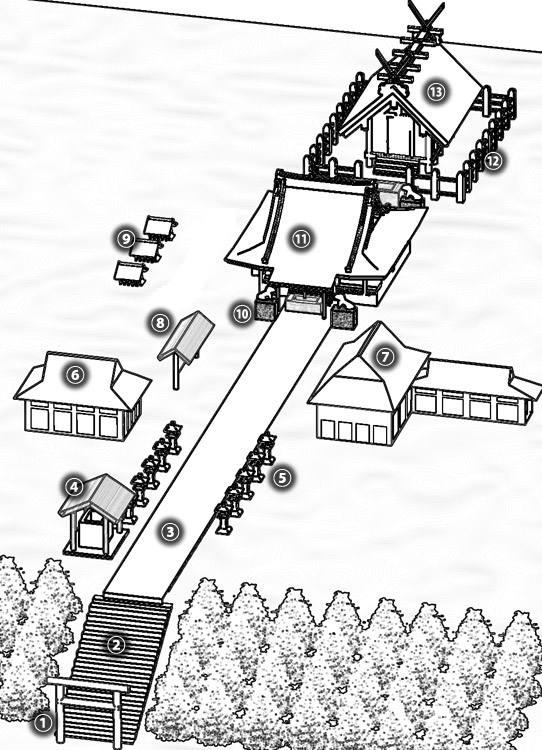
The composition of a Shinto shrine

The following is a diagram illustrating the most important elements of a Shinto shrine:

1. Torii – Shinto gate
2. Stone stairs
3. Sandō – the approach to the shrine
4. Chōzuya or temizuya – fountain to cleanse one's hands and face
5. Tōrō – decorative stone lanterns
6. Kagura-den – building dedicated to Nō or the sacred kagura dance
7. Shamusho – the shrine's administrative office
8. Ema – wooden plaques bearing prayers or wishes
9. Sessha/massha – small auxiliary shrines
10. Komainu – the so-called "lion dogs", guardians of the shrine
11. Haiden – oratory
12. Tamagaki – fence surrounding the honden
13. Honden – main hall, enshrining the kami.
14. On the roof of the haiden and honden are visible chigi (forked roof finials) and katsuogi (short horizontal logs), both common shrine ornamentations.

=== Gate (torii) ===
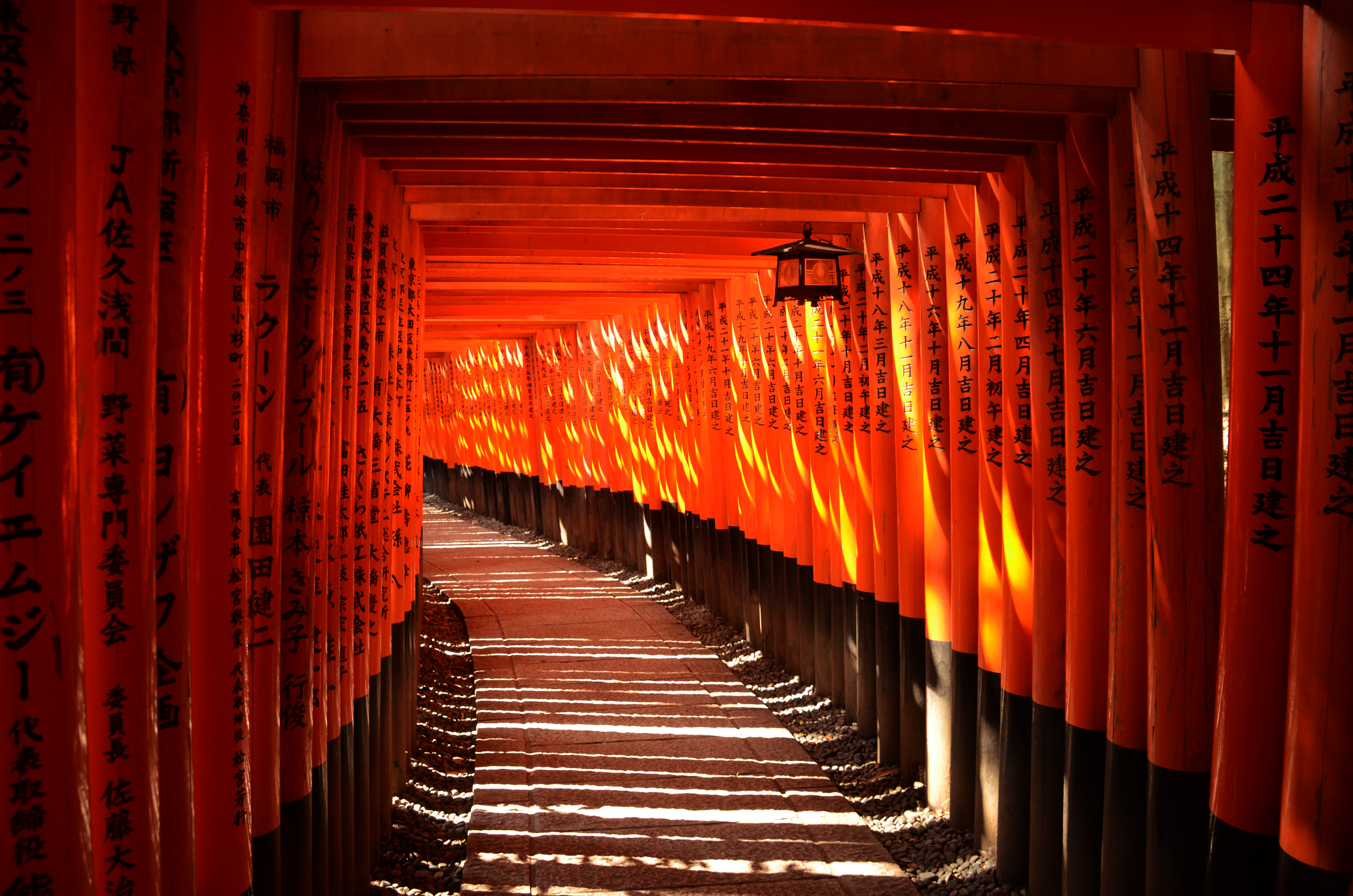
Senbon Torii at Fushimi Inari-taisha, Fushimi-ku, Kyoto

The torii is a gate which marks the entrance to a sacred area, usually but not necessarily a shrine. A shrine may have any number of torii (Fushimi Inari Taisha has thousands) made of wood, stone, metal, concrete or any other material. They can be found in different places within a shrine's precincts to signify an increased level of holiness.

Torii can often be found also at Buddhist temples, however they are an accepted symbol of Shinto, and as such are used to mark shrines on maps.

The origin of the torii is unclear, and no existing theory has been accepted as valid. They may for example have originated in India as a derivative of the torana gates in the monastery of Sanchi, which is located in central India.

=== Pathway (sandō) ===
The sandō is the road approaching either a Shinto shrine or a Buddhist temple. Its point of origin is usually straddled in the first case by a Shinto torii, in the second by a Buddhist sanmon, gates which mark the beginning of the shrine's or temple territory. There can also be stone lanterns and other decorations at any point along its course. There can be more than one sandō, in which case the main one is called omote-sandō, or front sandō, ura-sandō, or rear sandō, etc.

=== Fountain (chōzuya) ===
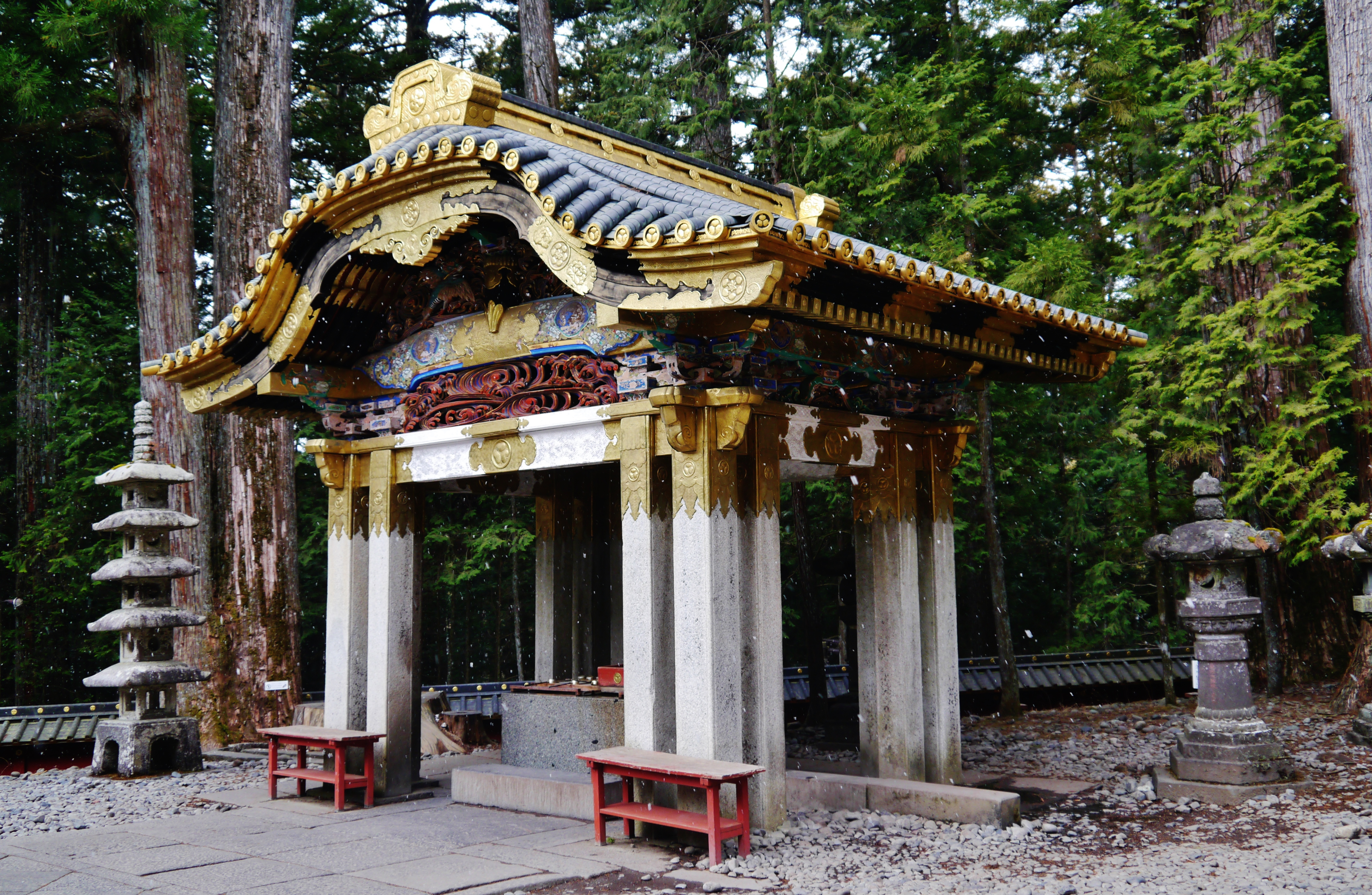
Chōzuya at Nikkō Tōshō-gū shrine in Nikkō, Tochigi

Before entering the shrine, visitors are supposed to wash their hands and mouths at a fountain built to the purpose called chōzuya or temizuya.

=== Guardian lion-dogs (komainu) ===
The two "lions" in front of a shrine are in effect warden dogs called komainu (狛犬). They were so called because they were thought to have been brought to Japan from China via Korea, and their name derives from koma (高麗), the Japanese term for the Korean kingdom of Koguryo. They are almost identical, but one has the mouth open, the other closed. This is a very common pattern in statue pairs at both temples and shrines, and has an important symbolic meaning. The open mouth is pronouncing the first letter of the sanskrit alphabet ("a"), the closed one the last ("um"), representing the beginning and the end of all things. The one with the open mouth is called shishi (獅子), the other komainu, a name that in time came to be used for both animals.

=== Worship hall (haiden) ===
The haiden is the hall of worship or oratory of the shrine. It is generally placed in front of the shrine's main sanctuary (honden) and often built on a larger scale than the latter. The haiden is often connected to the honden by a heiden, or hall of offerings. While the honden is the place for the enshrined kami and off-limits to the general public, the haiden provides a space for ceremonies and for worshiping the kami.

=== Offertory hall (heiden) ===
The heiden is the part of a shrine used to house offerings, and normally consists of a section linking the honden and the haiden . It can also be called chūden (中殿) or in other ways, and its position can sometimes vary. In spite of its name, nowadays it is used mostly for rituals.

=== Sanctuary (honden) ===
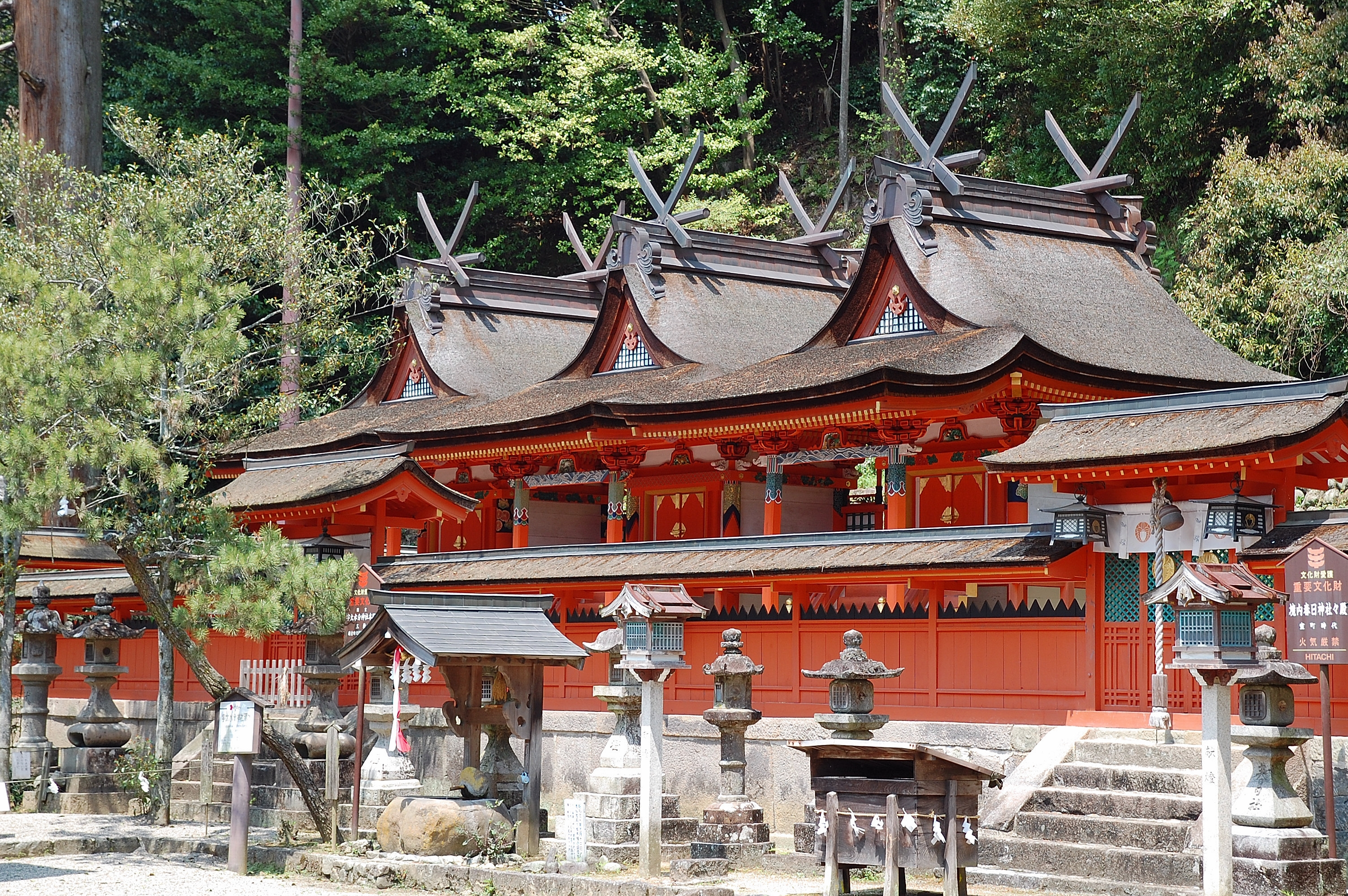
The honden at Uda Mikumari Shrine, located in Uda, Nara

The honden, also called shinden (神殿) is the most sacred building of a shrine, intended purely for the use of the enshrined kami. The kami, in itself incorporeal, is represented physically by a go-shintai, such as a mirror or a statue. The building is normally in the rear of the shrine and closed to the general public.

=== Other elements ===
==== Hokora ====
A hokora or hokura is a very small Shinto shrine either found on the precincts of a larger shrine and dedicated to folk kami, or on a street side, enshrining kami not under the jurisdiction of any large shrine. Dōsojin, minor kami protecting travelers from evil spirits, may for example be enshrined in a hokora.

==== Sessha, massha ====
Sessha (摂社, 'auxiliary shrine') and massha (末社, 'branch shrine'), also called eda-miya (枝宮) are small or miniature shrines having a deep historical relationship with a more important shrine or with the kami it enshrines, and fall under that shrine's jurisdiction. The two terms used to have different meanings, but must be today considered synonyms. For this reason, this kind of shrine is now sometimes called setsumatsusha (摂末社). (Note: The term setsumatsusha is the combination of the two terms sessha and massha.)

== Most common shrine styles ==
Shrine buildings can have many different basic layouts, usually named either after a famous shrine's honden (e.g. hiyoshi-zukuri, named after Hiyoshi Taisha), or a structural characteristic (e.g. irimoya-zukuri, after the hip-and-gable roof it adopts. The suffix -zukuri in this case means "structure".)

The honden's roof is always gabled, and some styles also have a veranda-like aisle called hisashi (a 1-ken wide corridor surrounding one or more sides of the core of a shrine or temple). Among the factors involved in the classification, important are the presence or absence of:

- hirairi or hirairi-zukuri (平入・平入造) – a style of construction in which the building has its main entrance on the side which runs parallel to the roof's ridge (non gabled-side). The shinmei-zukuri, nagare-zukuri, hachiman-zukuri, and hie-zukuri belong to this type.
- tsumairi or tsumairi-zukuri (妻入・妻入造) – a style of construction in which the building has its main entrance on the side which runs perpendicular to the roof's ridge (gabled side). The taisha-zukuri, sumiyoshi-zukuri, ōtori-zukuri and kasuga-zukuri belong to this type.

Proportions are also important. A building of a given style often must have certain proportions measured in ken (the distance between pillars, a quantity variable from one shrine to another or even within the same shrine).

The oldest styles are the tsumairi shinmei-zukuri, taisha-zukuri, and sumiyoshi-zukuri, believed to predate the arrival of Buddhism.

The two most common are the hirairi nagare-zukuri and the tsumairi kasuga-zukuri. Larger, more important shrines tend to have unique styles.

=== Nagare-zukuri ===
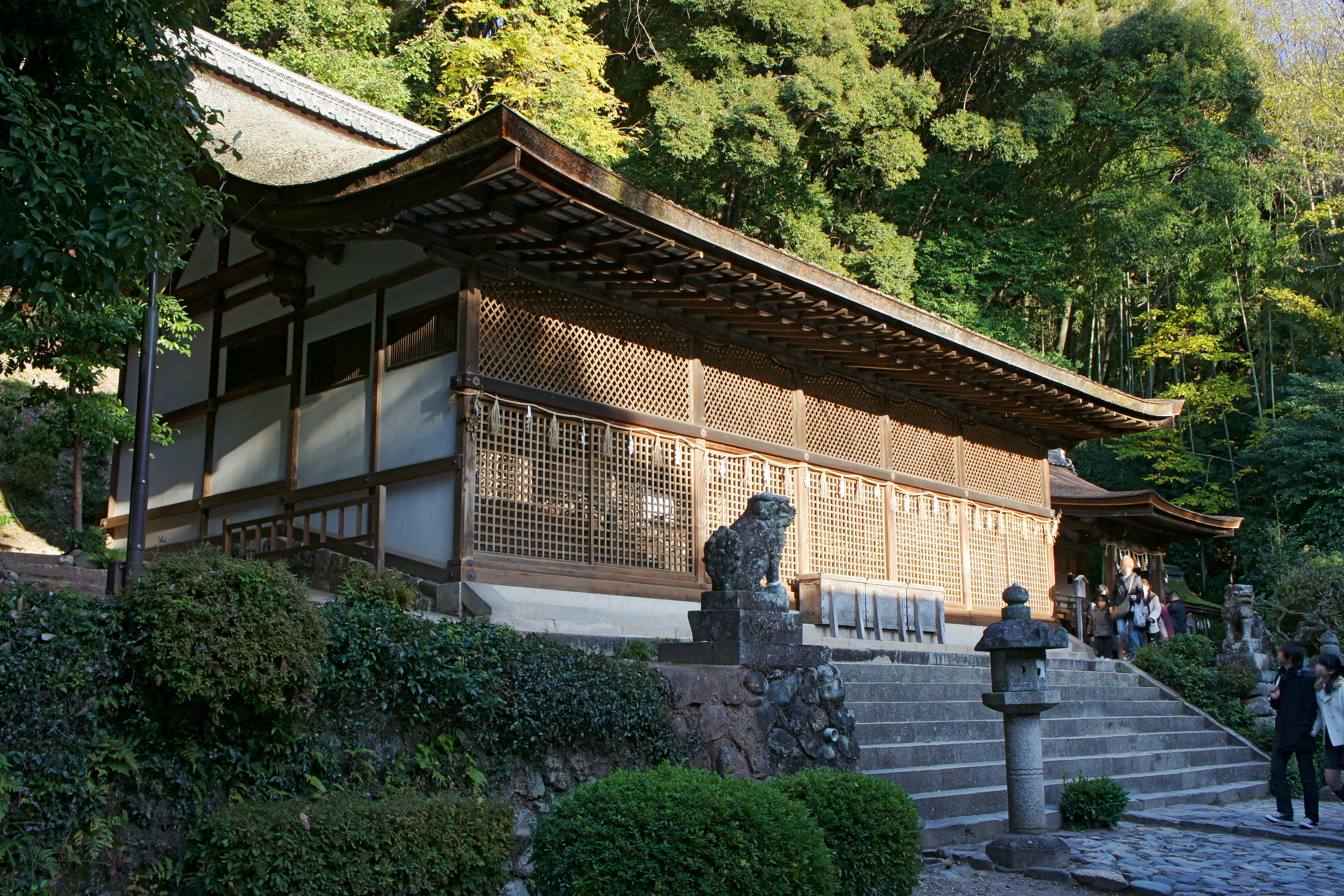
Ujigami Shrine in Uji, Kyoto Prefecture

The nagare-zukuri (流造, 'flowing style') or nagare hafu-zukuri (流破風造, 'flowing gabled style') is a style characterized by a very asymmetrical gabled roof (切妻屋根 kirizuma-yane in Japanese) projecting outwards on the non-gabled side, above the main entrance, to form a portico. This is the feature which gives the style its name, the most common among shrines all over the country.

Sometimes the basic layout consisting of an elevated core (母屋, moya) partially surrounded by a veranda called hisashi (all under the same roof) is modified by the addition of a room in front of the entrance. The honden varies in roof ridge length from 1 to 11 ken, but is never 6 or 8 ken. The most common sizes are 1 and 3 ken. The oldest shrine in Japan, Uji's Ujigami Shrine, has a honden of this type. Its external dimensions are 5x3 ken, but internally it is composed of three sanctuaries (内殿, naiden) measuring 1 ken each.

=== Kasuga-zukuri ===
Kasuga-zukuri (春日造) as a style takes its name from Kasuga Taisha's honden. It is characterized by the extreme smallness of the building, just 1 × 1 ken in size. In Kasuga Taisha's case, this translates in 1.9 m × 2.6 m. The roof is gabled with a single entrance at the gabled end, decorated with chigi and katsuogi, covered with cypress bark and curved upwards at the eaves. Supporting structures are painted vermillion, while the plank walls are white.

After the Nagare-zukuri, this is the most common style, with most instances in the Kansai region around Nara.

== Other styles ==
Follows a list of other styles (in alphabetical order). Many are rare, some unique. Most deal with the structure of a single building but others, for example the Ishi-no-ma-zukuri style, define instead the relationship between member structures. In that case, the same building can fall under two separate classifications. For example, the honden and haiden at Ōsaki Hachimangū are single-storied, irimoya-zukuri edifices. Because they are connected by a passage called ishi-no-ma and are covered by a single roof, however, the complex is classified as belonging to the ishi-no-ma-zukuri'style (also called gongen-zukuri).

=== Gongen-zukuri ===
The name comes from Nikkō Tōshō-gū in Nikkō because it enshrines the Tōshō Daigongen (Tokugawa Ieyasu).

=== Hachiman-zukuri ===
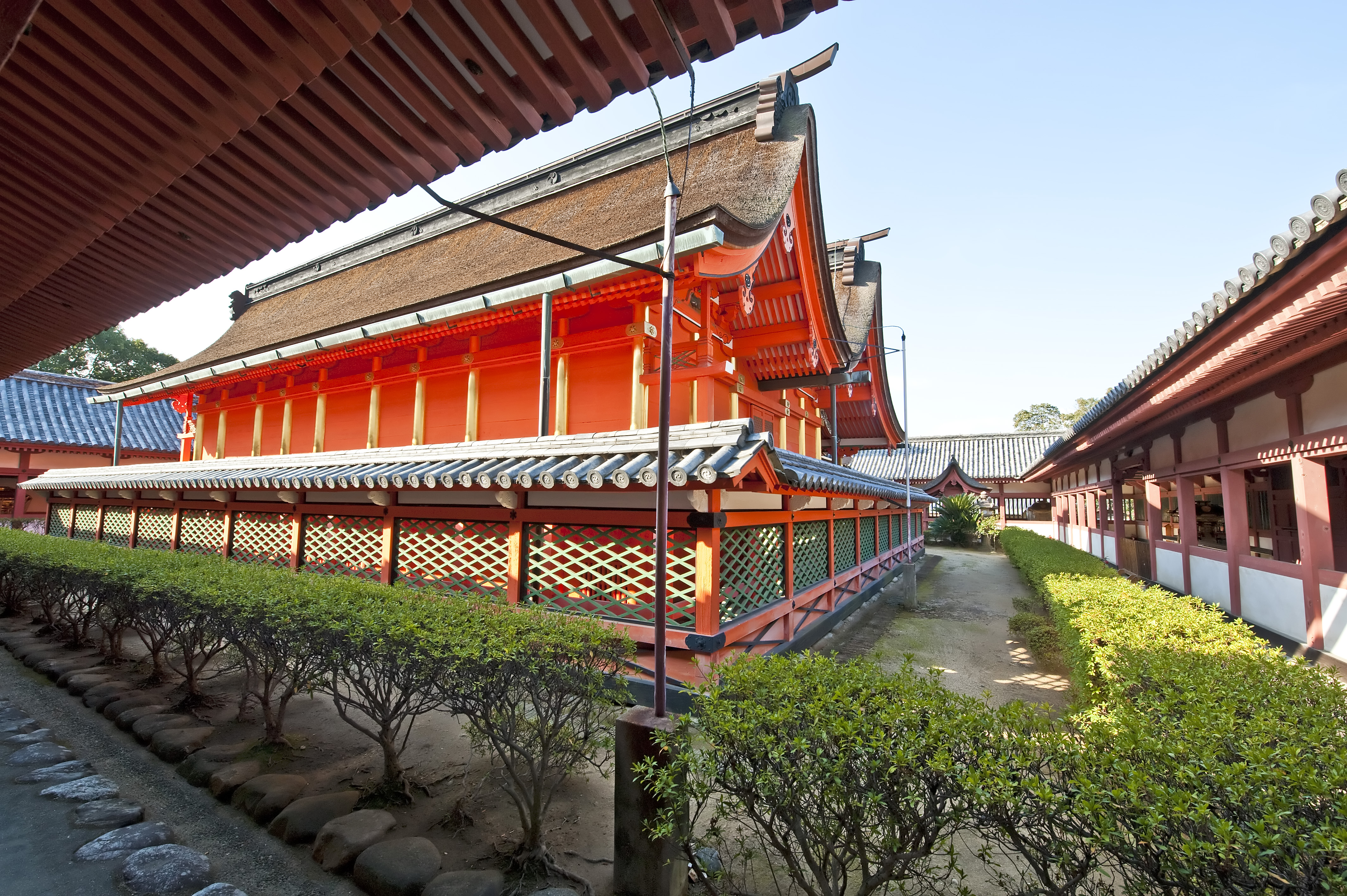
The honden at Isaniwa Shrine (伊佐爾波神社) in Matsuyama, Ehime, is a rare example of the hachiman-zukuri style. The honden (left) is surrounded by a cloister-like corridor called kairō (right).

Hachiman-zukuri (八幡造) is a style used at Hachiman shrines in which two parallel structures with gabled roofs are interconnected on the non-gabled side, forming one building which, when seen from the side, gives the impression of two. The front structure is called gaiden (外殿, outer sanctuary), the rear one naiden (内殿, inner sanctuary), and together they form the honden. There are entrances at the center of the non-gabled side. In general, the rear structure is 3 × 2 ken, while the front one is 3 × 1.

The space between the two structures is one ken wide and forms a room called ai-no-ma (相の間). The actual width and height of this room vary with the shrine.

Extant examples are Usa Shrine and Iwashimizu Hachiman-gū. This style, of which only five Edo period examples survive, may be of Buddhist origin, since some Buddhist buildings show the same division. For example, Tōdai-ji's hokke-dō (Note: Literally "Lotus Sūtra Hall. A hall whose layout allows walking around a statue for meditation) is divided in two sections laid out front and back. Structural details also show a strong relationship with the Heian period style called shinden-zukuri used in aristocratic residences. Another possible origin of this style may have been early palaces, known to have had parallel ridges on the roof.

=== Hiyoshi-zukuri ===
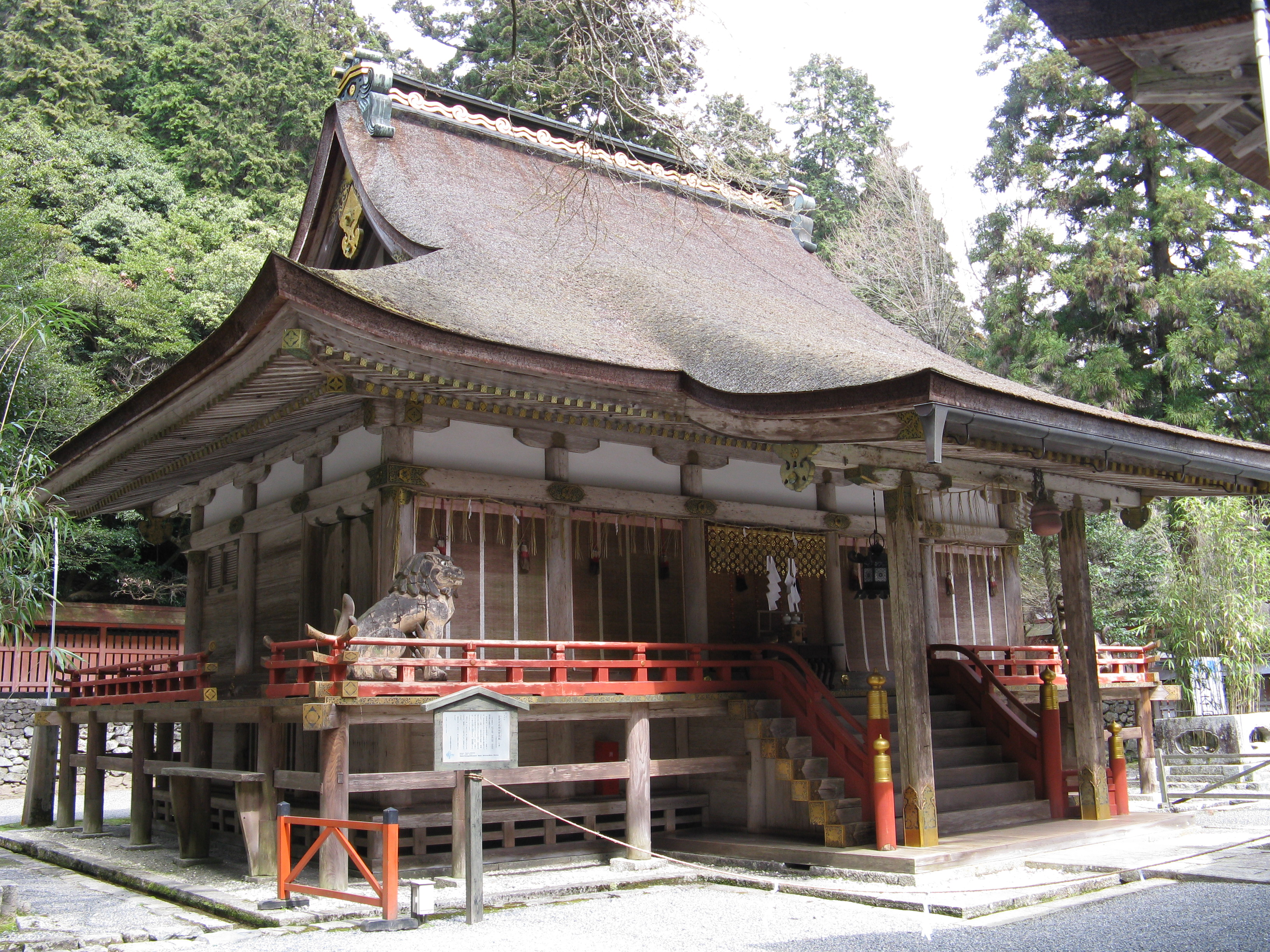
Hiyoshi Taisha's Nishi Hon-gū

Hiyoshi-zukuri / hie-zukuri' (日吉造), also called shōtei-zukuri / shōtai-zukuri (聖帝造) or sannō-zukuri (山王造) is a rare style presently found in only three instances, all at Hiyoshi Taisha in Ōtsu, Shiga. They are the East and West Honden Hon-gū (本殿本宮) and the Sessha Usa Jingū Honden (摂社宇佐神宮本殿).

The building is composed of a 3x2 ken core called moya surrounded on three sides by a 1-ken wide hisashi, totaling 5x3 ken (see photo). The three-sided hisashi is unique and typical of this style. The gabled roof extends in small porticos on the front and the two gabled sides. The roof on the back has a peculiar and characteristic shape.

=== Irimoya-zukuri ===
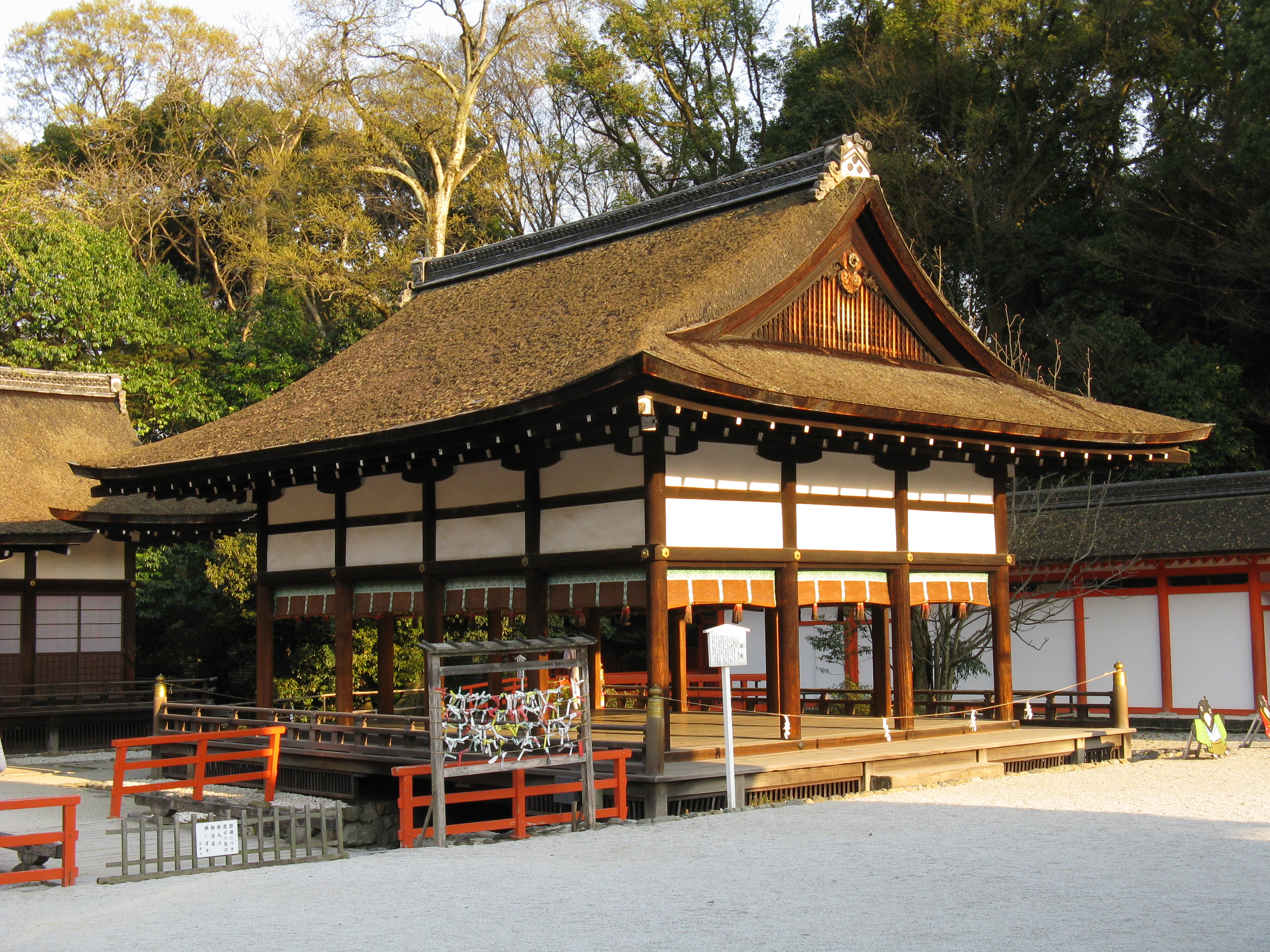
A hip-and-gable roof at Shimogamo Shrine

Irimoya-zukuri (入母屋造, lit. hip and gable roof style) is a honden style having a hip (Note: A hip roof, or hipped roof, is a type of roof where all sides slope downwards to the walls, usually with a fairly gentle slope.)-and-gable (Note: A gable is the generally triangular portion of a wall enclosed between the edges of a sloping roof.) structure, that is, a gabled roof with one or two hips, and is used for example in Kitano Tenman-gū's honden. The style is of Chinese origin and arrived in Japan together with Buddhism in the 6th century. It was originally used in the Kon-dō and Kō-dō (lecture halls) of Buddhist temples, but started to be used also in shrines later, during the Japanese Middle Ages.

The name derives from its hip and gable roof (入母屋屋根, irimoya yane). In Japan the gable is right above the edge of the shrine's moya, while the hip covers the hisashi. In lay architecture it is often called just moya-zukuri. Extant examples are Mikami Shrine in Shiga prefecture and Yasaka Shrine in Kyoto.

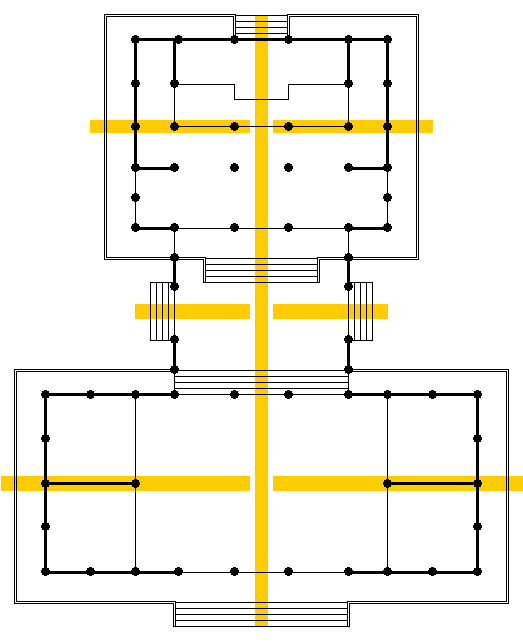
A gongen-zukuri shrine. From the top: honden, ishi-no-ma, haiden. In yellow the ridges of the various roofs.

=== Ishi-no-ma-zukuri ===
Ishi-no-ma-zukuri (石の間造), also called gongen-zukuri (権現造), yatsumune-zukuri (八棟造) and miyadera-zukuri (宮寺造) is the name of a complex shrine structure in which the haiden, or worship hall, and the honden, or main sanctuary, are interconnected under the same roof in the shape of an H.

The connecting passage can be called ai-no-ma (相の間), ishi-no-ma (石の間), or chūden (中殿, intermediate hall). The floor of each of the three halls can be at a different level. If the ai-no-ma is paved with stones it is called ishi-no-ma, whence the name of the style. It can, however, be paved with planks or tatami. Its width is often the same as the honden's, with the haiden from one to three ken wider.

One of the oldest examples is Kitano Tenman-gū in Kyoto. The gongen-zukuri name comes from Nikkō Tōshō-gū in Nikkō, which enshrines the Tōshō Daigongen (Tokugawa Ieyasu) and adopts this structure.

=== Kibitsu-zukuri ===
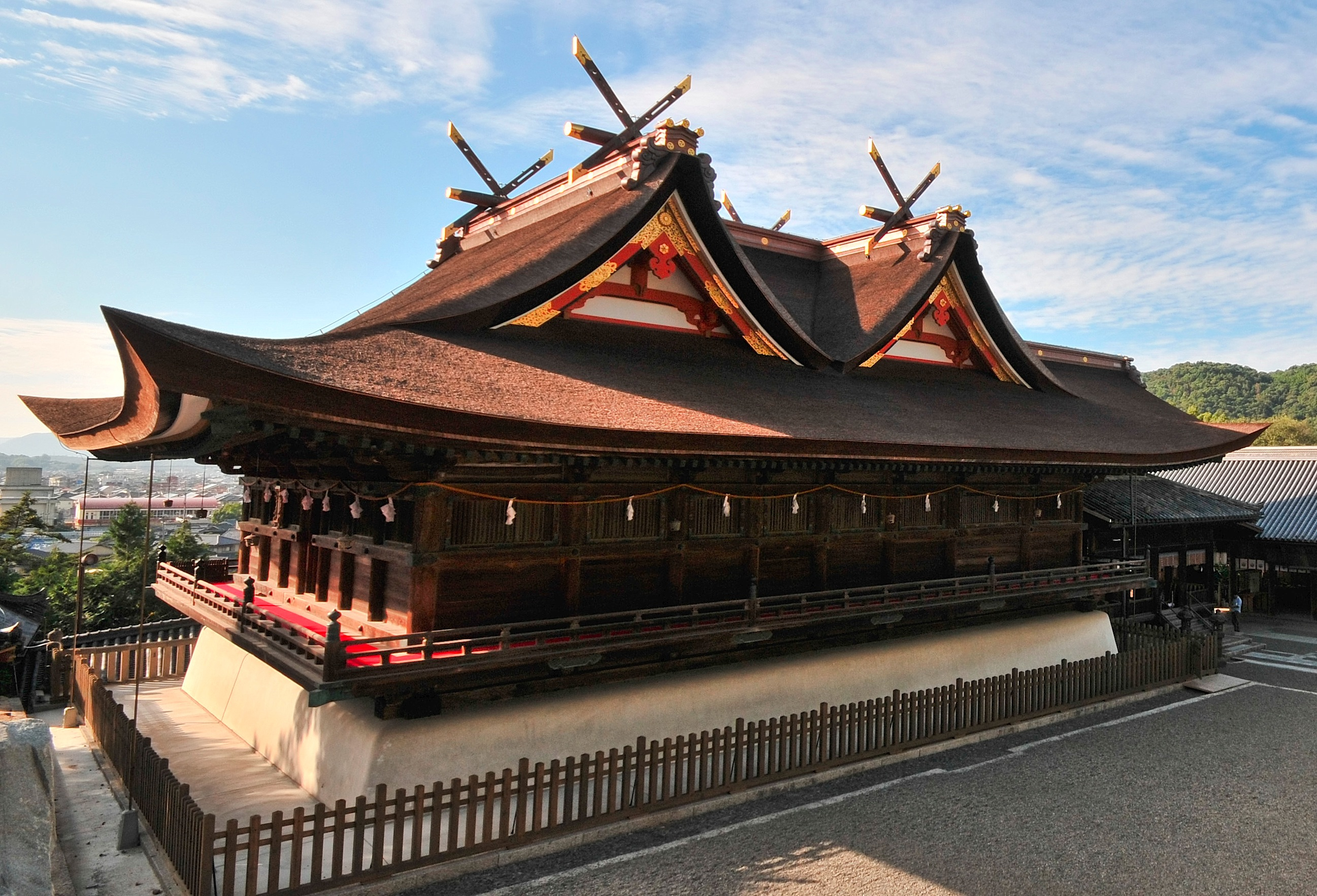
Kibitsu Shrine's honden-haiden complex. The main entrance (hidden) is on the right.

Kibitsu-zukuri (吉備津造), kibi-zukuri (吉備造) or hiyoku irimoya-zukuri (入母屋造) is a style characterized by four dormer gables, two per lateral side, on the roof of a very large honden (sanctuary). The gables are set at a right angle to the main roof ridge, and the honden is part of a single complex also including a haiden (worship hall). Kibitsu Shrine in Okayama, Okayama Prefecture, Japan is the sole example of this style.

=== Misedana-zukuri ===
Misedana-zukuri (見世棚造 or 店棚造, showcase style) owes its name to the fact that, unlike the other shrine styles, it does not feature a stairway at the entrance, and the veranda is completely flat. It is normally used only in sessha and massha, tiny, 1 ken shrines sometimes found on the premises of larger ones. They can however be as small as beehives or relatively large and have 1x2, 1x3 or even, in one case, 1x7 bays. Apart from the lack of a staircase, such shrines belong to the nagare-zukuri or kasuga-zukuri styles and have their entrance on the non-gabled (hirairi) or gabled side (tsumairi).

=== Ōtori-zukuri ===
The Ōtori-zukuri (大鳥造) is a tsumairi style named after Ōtori taisha in Ōsaka. Its floor is elevated and 2x2 ken in size, without a veranda or railings. This style seems to have the same origins as the ancient sumiyoshi- and taisha-zukuri styles, which it resembles, and the absence of a veranda may be due to the use in origin of an earthen floor, still in use in some shrines. The interior is divided in two, naijin (inner chamber) and gejin (outer chamber). The roof is covered with layers of cypress bark shingles and has a high ridge with an ornamental rather than functional role. It does not curve upwards at the eaves and the bargeboards are simple and straight. Chigi and three katsuogi are present.

=== Owari-zukuri ===
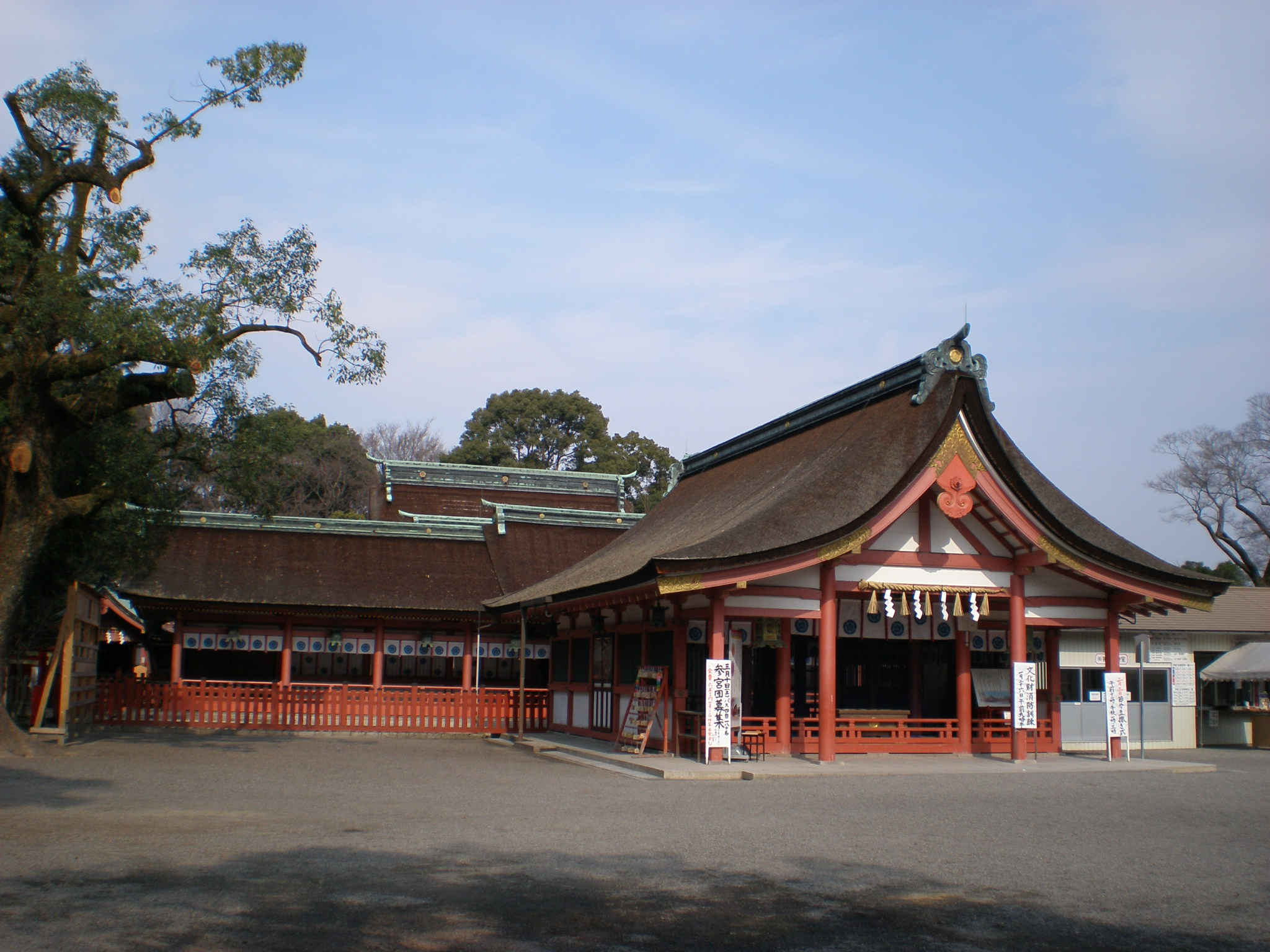
The Tsushima Shrine in Tsushima, Aichi

Owari-zukuri (尾張造) is a complex style found in large shrines of what used to be called Owari province, near Nagoya. It features many structures within the same compound, among them a honden, a haiden, a tsuriwata-rō (a suspended passageway), a yotsuashimon (a gate built with four pillars), and other buildings. Extant examples of this style include Owari Ōkunitama Shrine and Tsushima Shrine.

=== Primitive shrine layout without honden ===
This style is rare, but historically important. It is also unique in that the honden, normally the very center of a shrine, is missing. It is believed shrines of this type are reminiscent of what shrines were like in prehistorical times. The first shrines had no honden because the shintai, or object of worship, was the mountain on which they stood. An extant example is Nara's Ōmiwa Shrine, which still has no honden. An area near the haiden (hall of worship), sacred and taboo, replaces it for worship. Another prominent example of this style is Futarasan Shrine near Nikkō, whose shintai is Mount Nantai. For details, see Birth and evolution of Shinto shrines above.

=== Ryōnagare-zukuri ===
Ryōnagare-zukuri (両流造, double flow style) is an evolution of the nagare-zukuri in which the roof flows down to form a portico on both non-gabled sides. Examples are the honden at Itsukushima Shrine and at Matsuo Taisha.

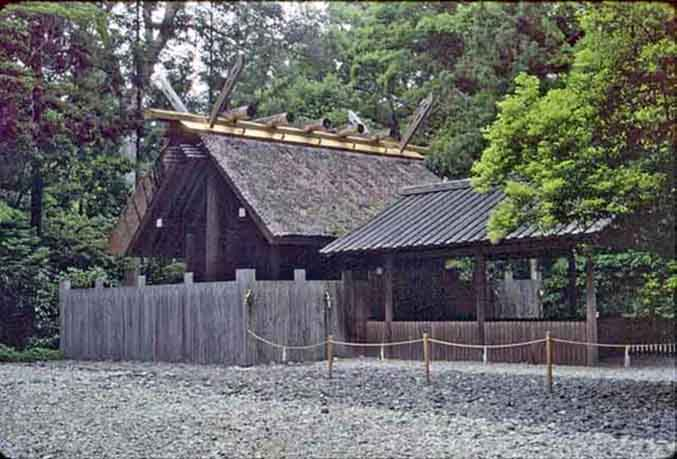
A shrine at Ise

=== Shinmei-zukuri ===
Shinmei-zukuri (神明造) is an ancient style typical of, and most common at Ise Grand Shrine, the holiest of Shinto shrines. It is most common in Mie prefecture. Characterized by an extreme simplicity, its basic features can be seen in Japanese architecture from the Kofun period (250–538 CE) onwards and it is considered the pinnacle of Japanese traditional architecture. Built in planed, unfinished wood, the honden is either 3x2 ken or 1x1ken in size, has a raised floor, a gabled roof with an entry on one the non-gabled sides, no upward curve at the eaves, and decorative logs called chigi and katsuogi protruding from the roof's ridge. The oldest extant example is Nishina Shinmei Shrine, the shrine which gives the style its name.

=== Sumiyoshi-zukuri ===
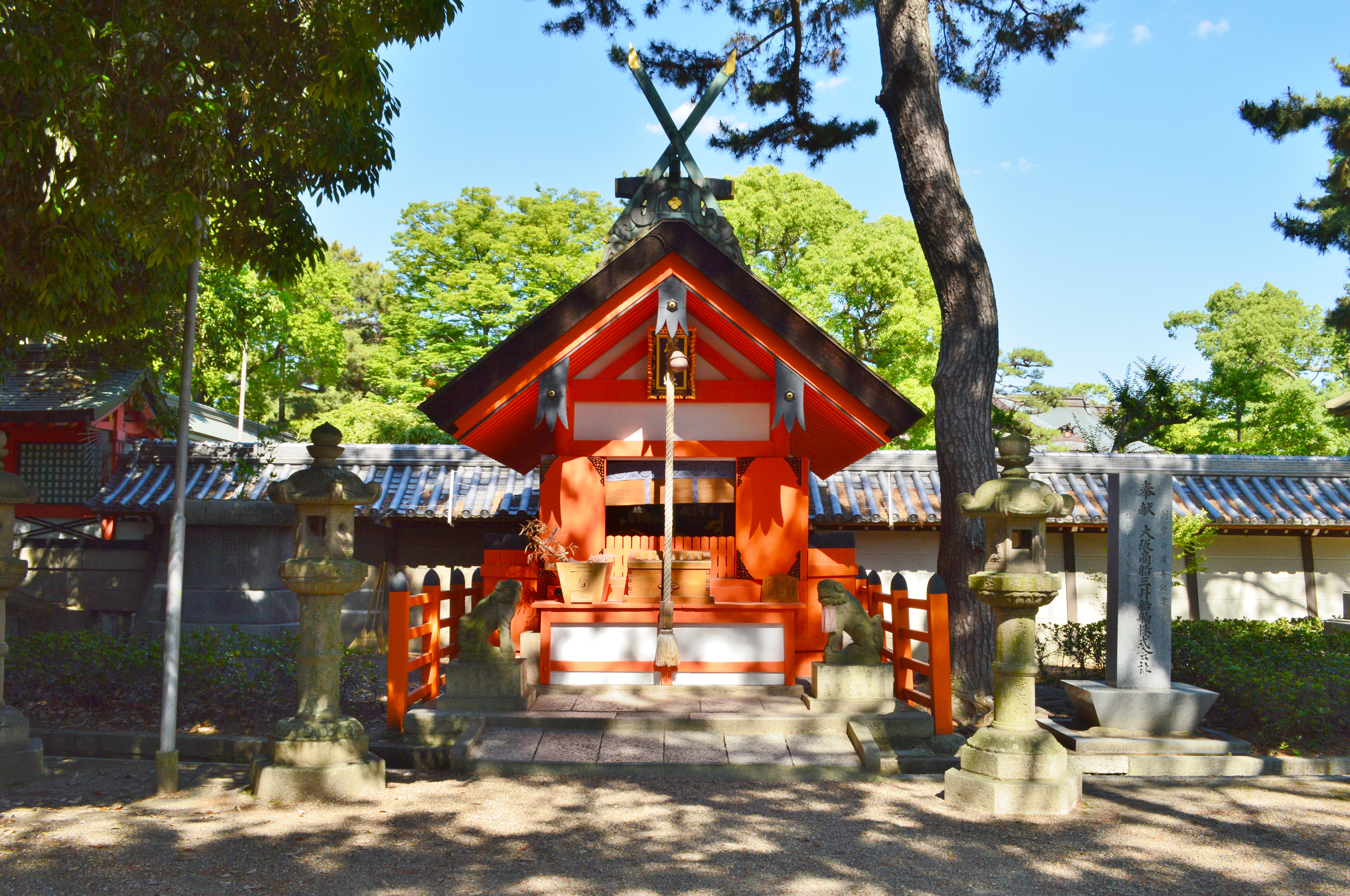
Sumiyoshi-taisha's Funatama Jinja

Sumiyoshi-zukuri (住吉造) takes its name from Sumiyoshi-taisha's honden in Ōsaka. The building is 4 ken wide and 2 ken deep, and has an entrance under the gable. Its interior is divided in two sections, one at the front (gejin (外陣)) and one at the back (naijin (内陣)) with a single entrance at the front. Construction is simple, but the pillars are painted in vermilion and the walls in white.

The style is supposed to have its origin in old palace architecture Another example of this style is Sumiyoshi Jinja, part of the Sumiyoshi Sanjin complex in Fukuoka Prefecture. In both cases, as in many others, there is no veranda.

=== Taisha-zukuri ===
Taisha-zukuri or Ōyashiro-zukuri (大社造) is the oldest shrine style, takes its name from Izumo Taisha and, like Ise Grand Shrine's, has chigi and katsuogi, plus archaic features like gable-end pillars and a single central pillar (shin no mihashira). Because its floor is raised on stilts, it is believed to have its origin in raised-floor granaries similar to those found in Toro, Shizuoka prefecture.

The honden normally has a 2x2 ken footprint (12.46x12.46 m in Izumo Taisha's case), with an entrance on the gabled end. The stairs to the honden are covered by a cypress bark roof. The oldest extant example of the style is Kamosu Jinja's honden in Shimane Prefecture, built in the 16th century.

== Gallery ==
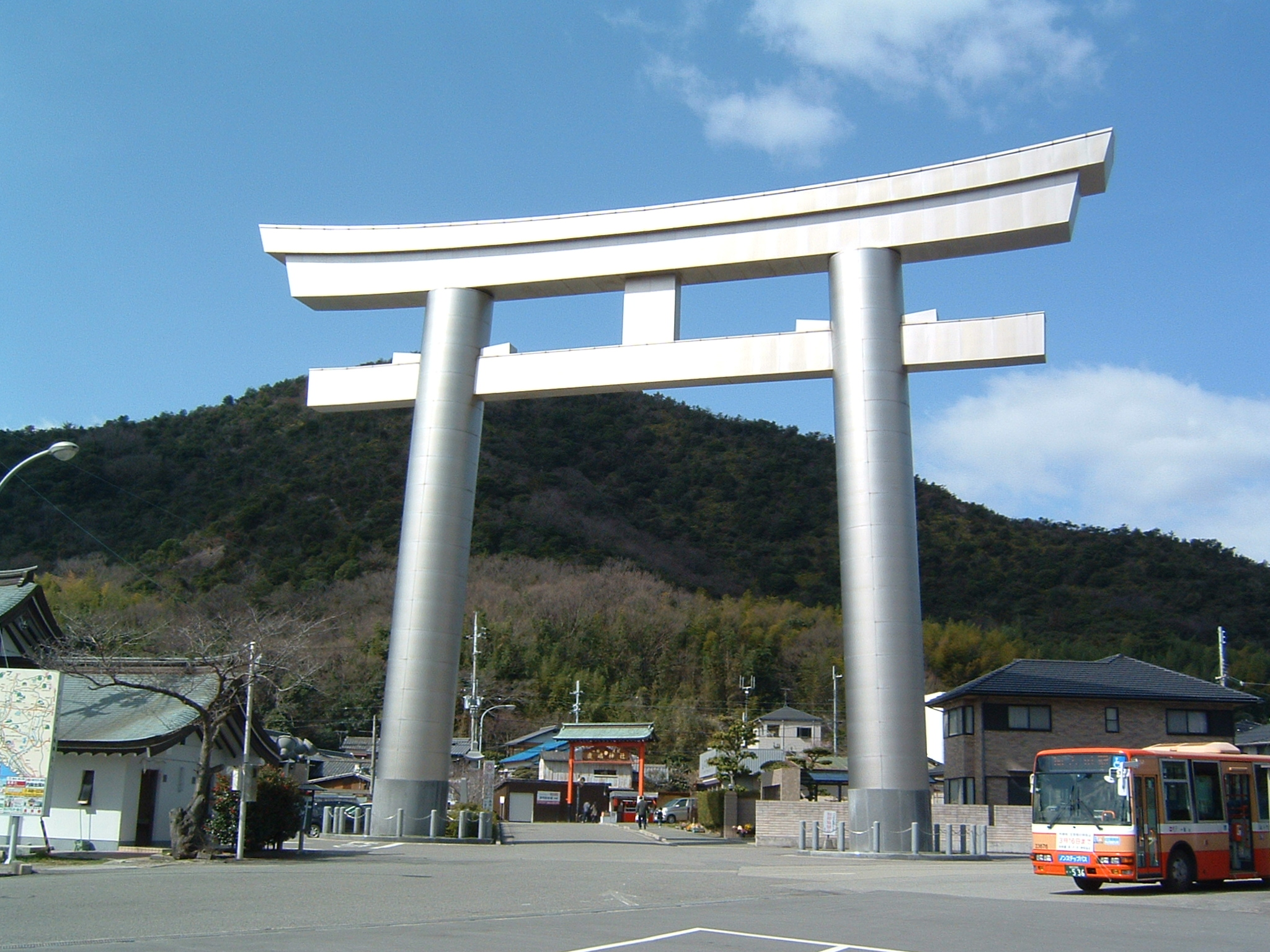
A metal torii

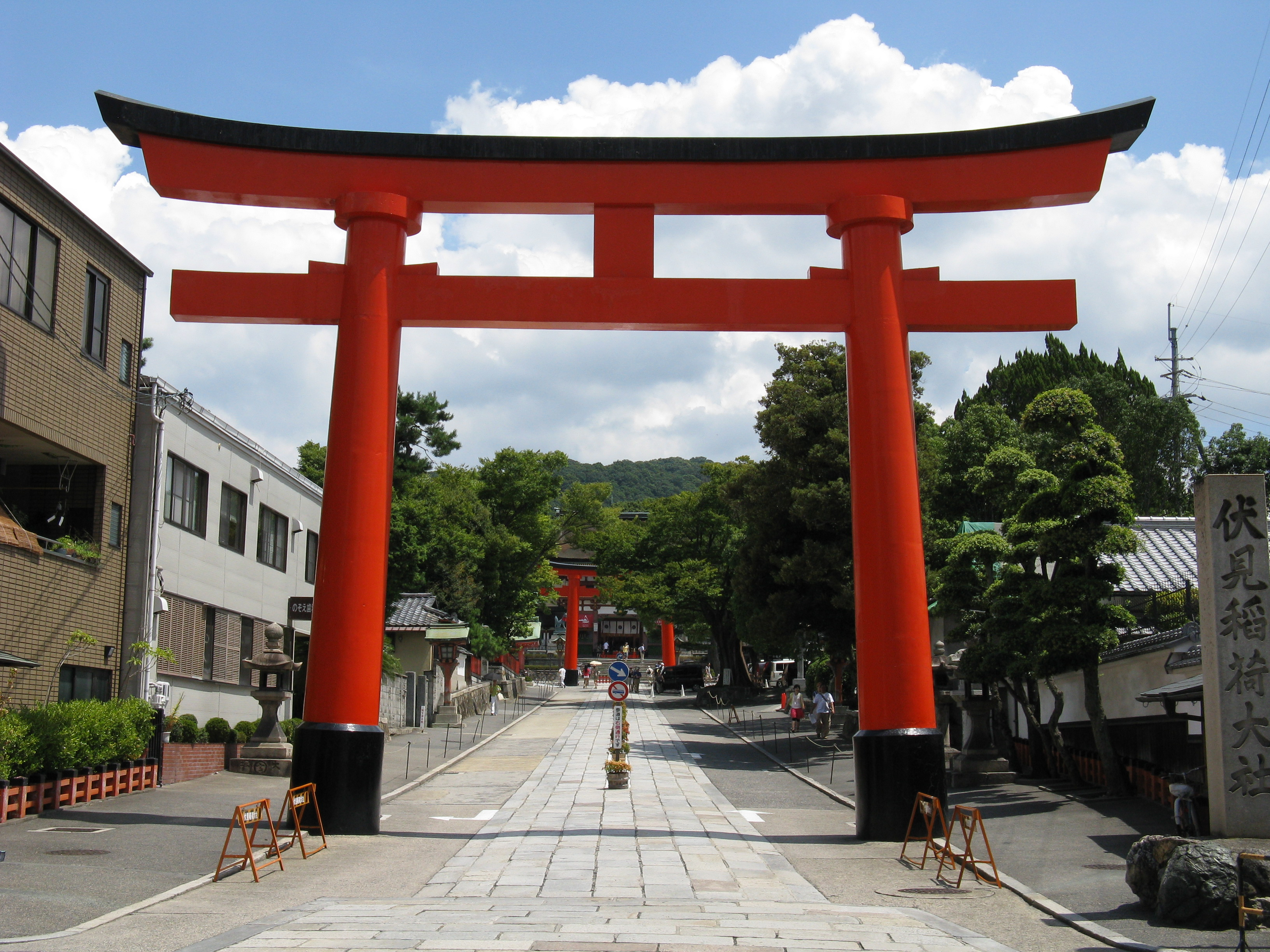
A sandō

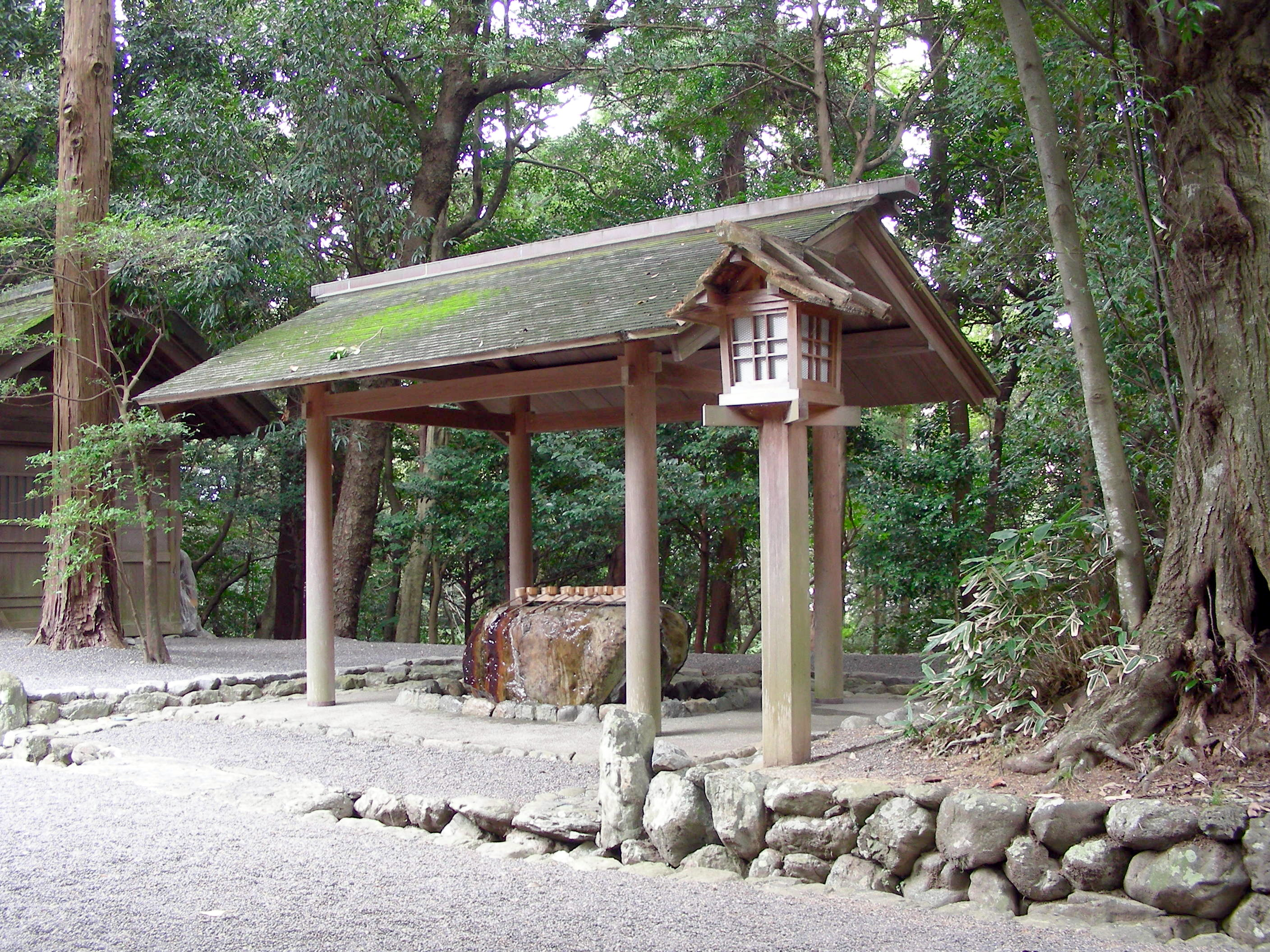
A temizuya

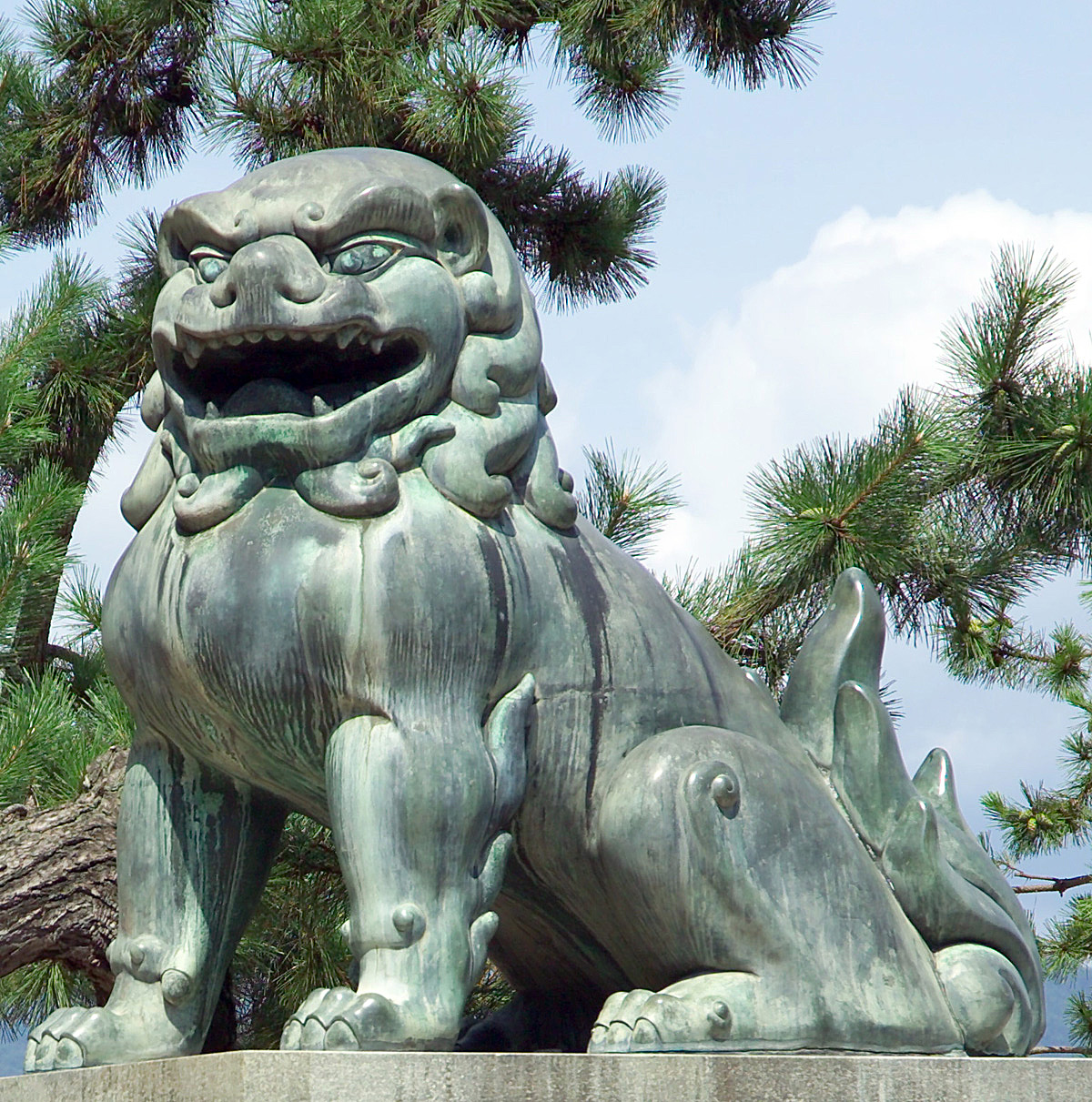
A komainu

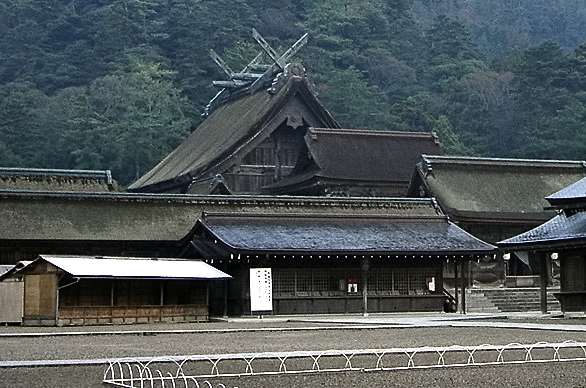
Izumo Taisha's honden

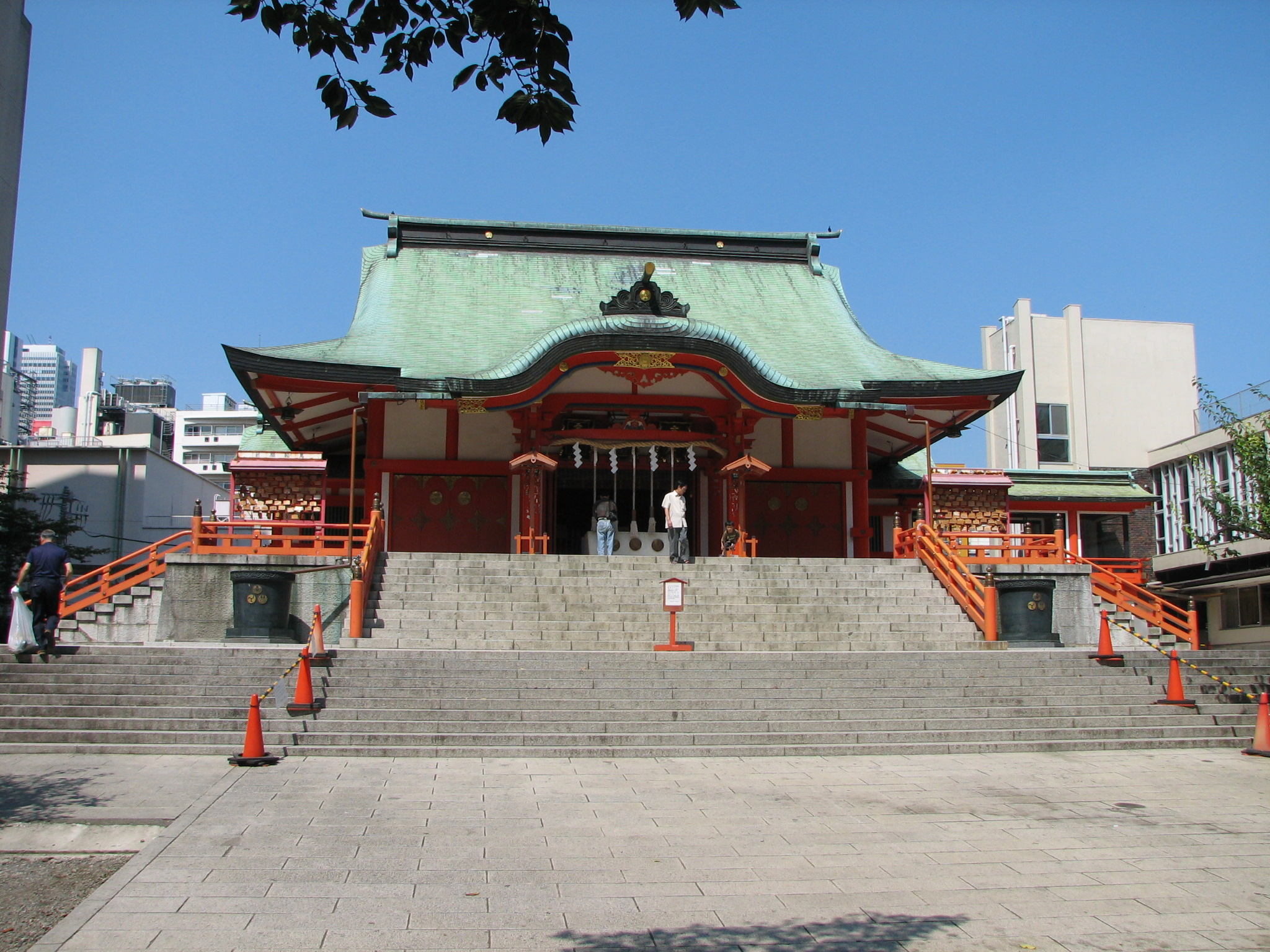
Hanazono Jinja's haiden

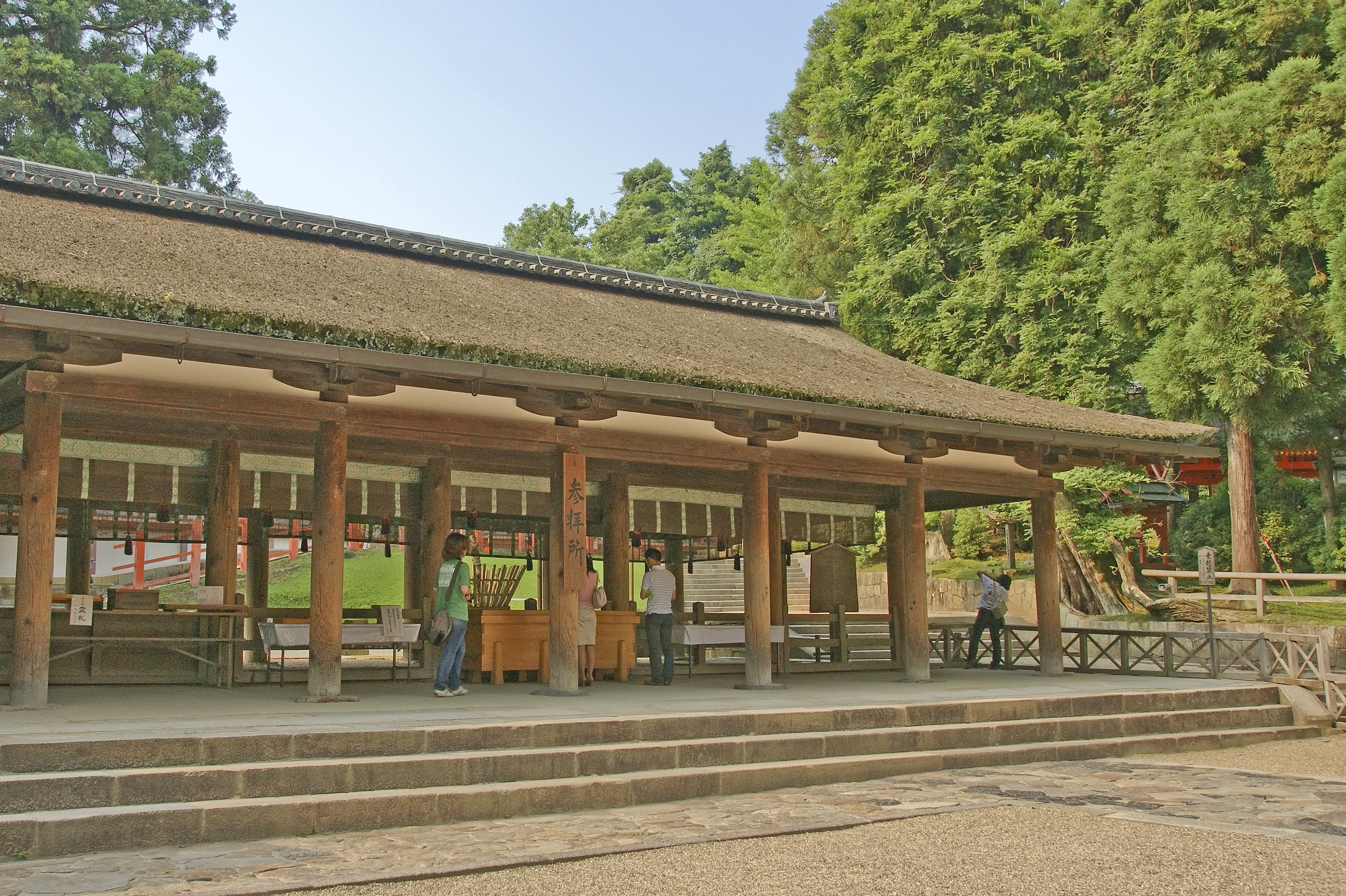
Kasuga Taisha's heiden

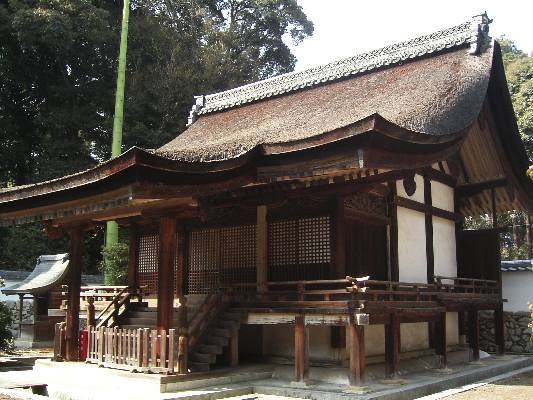
Hirairi style: entrance on the non-gabled side

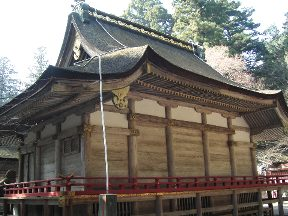
The typical shape of the back of a Hiyoshi-zukuri roof

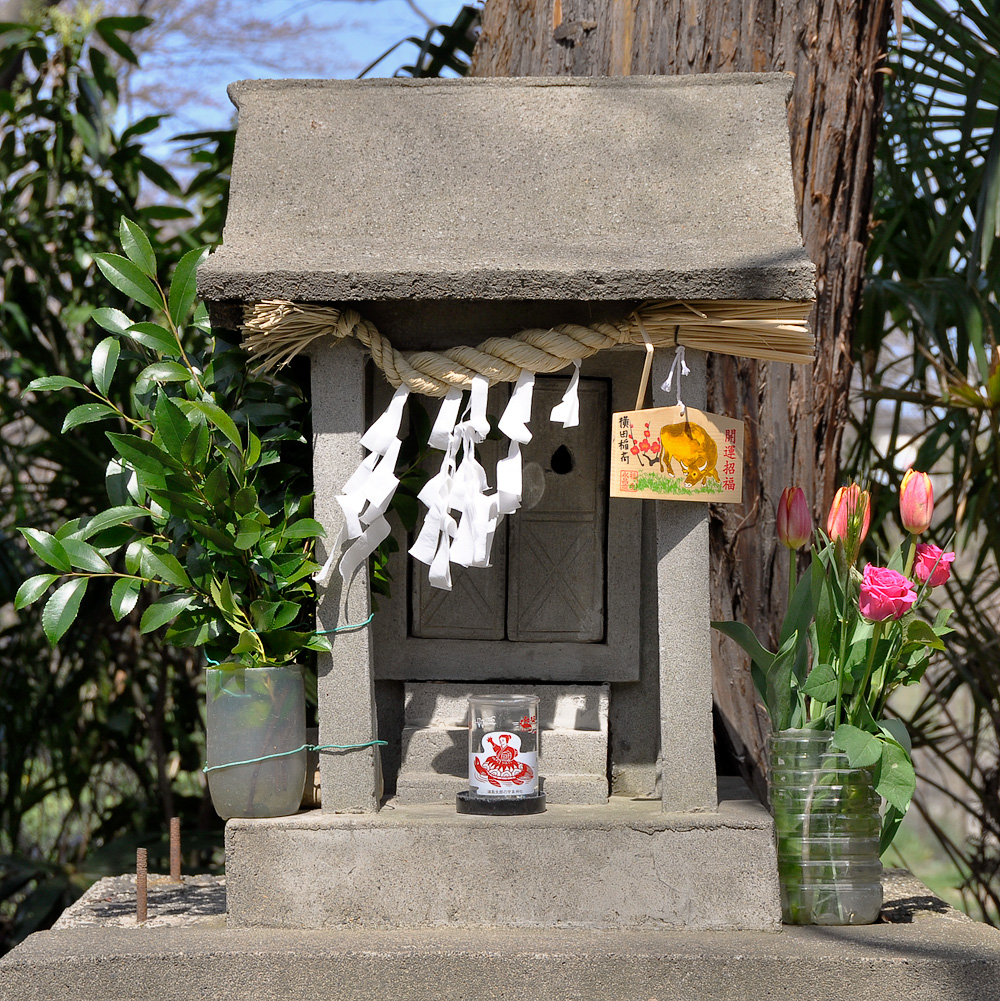
A hokora

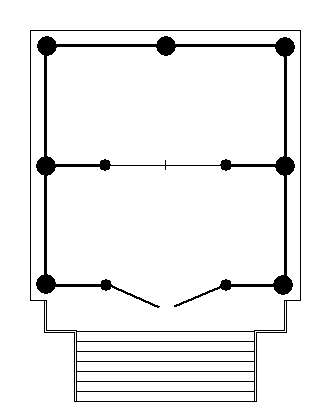
Ōtori-zukuri

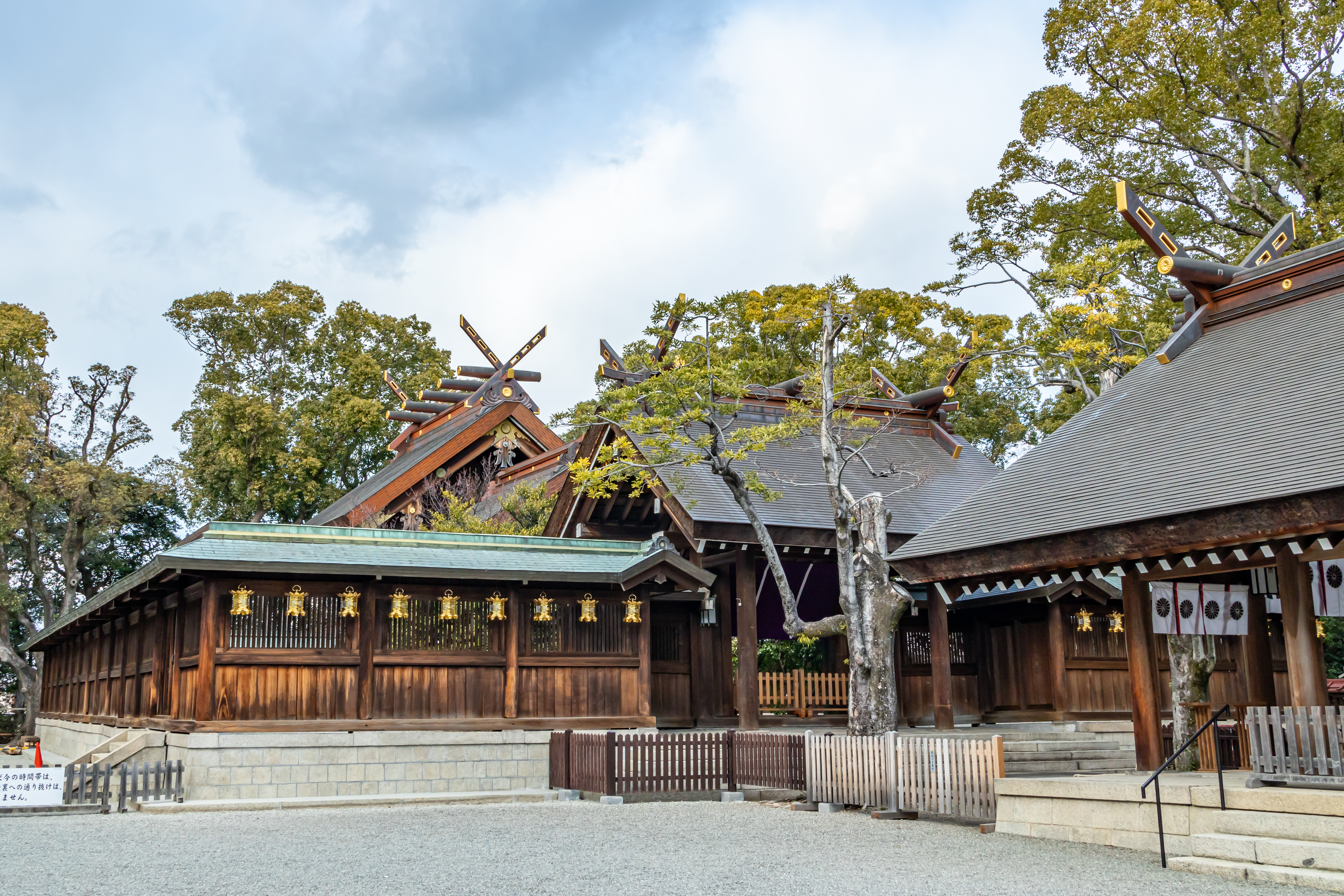
Ōtori Taisha's honden

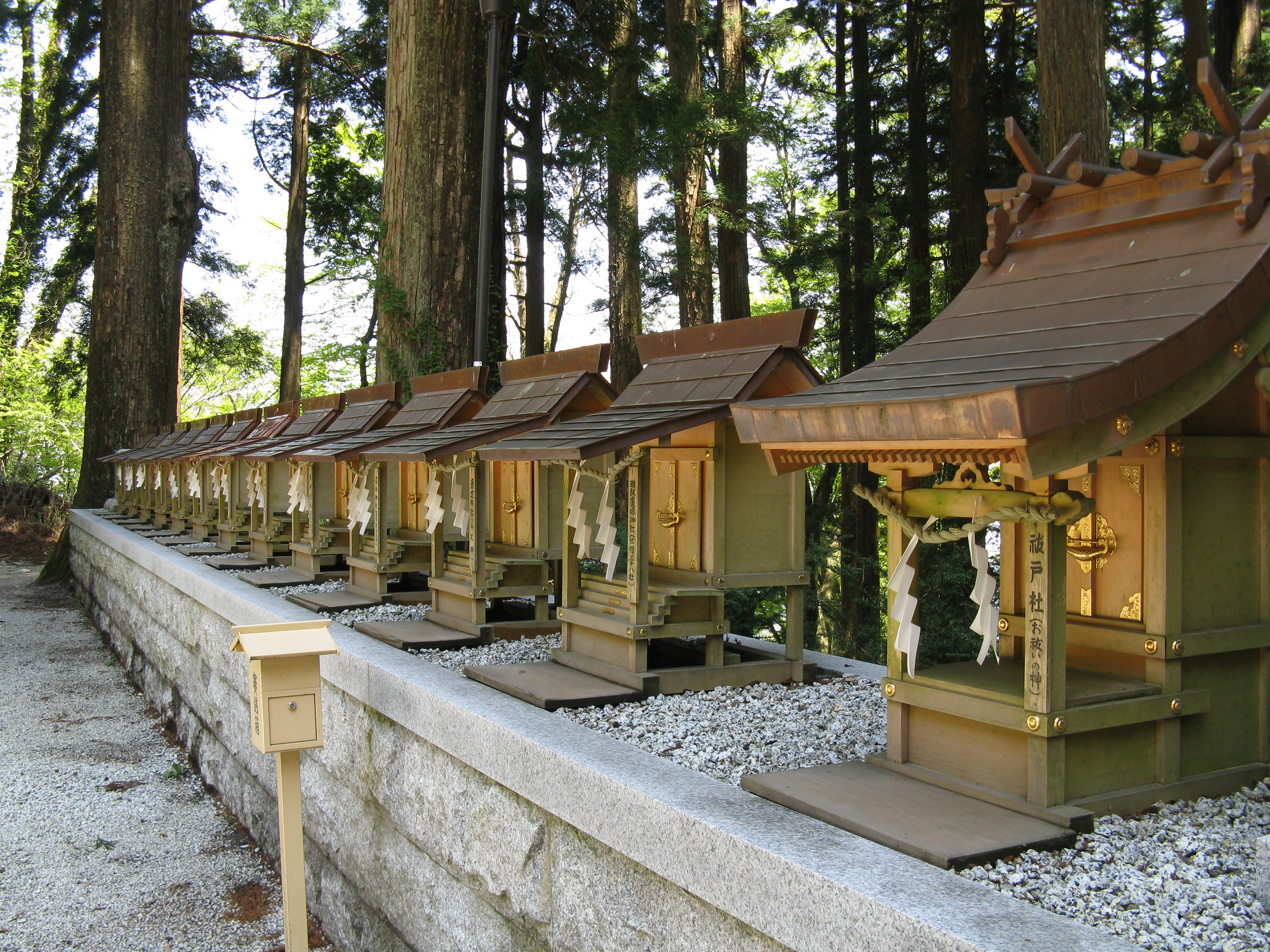
Some setsumatsusha

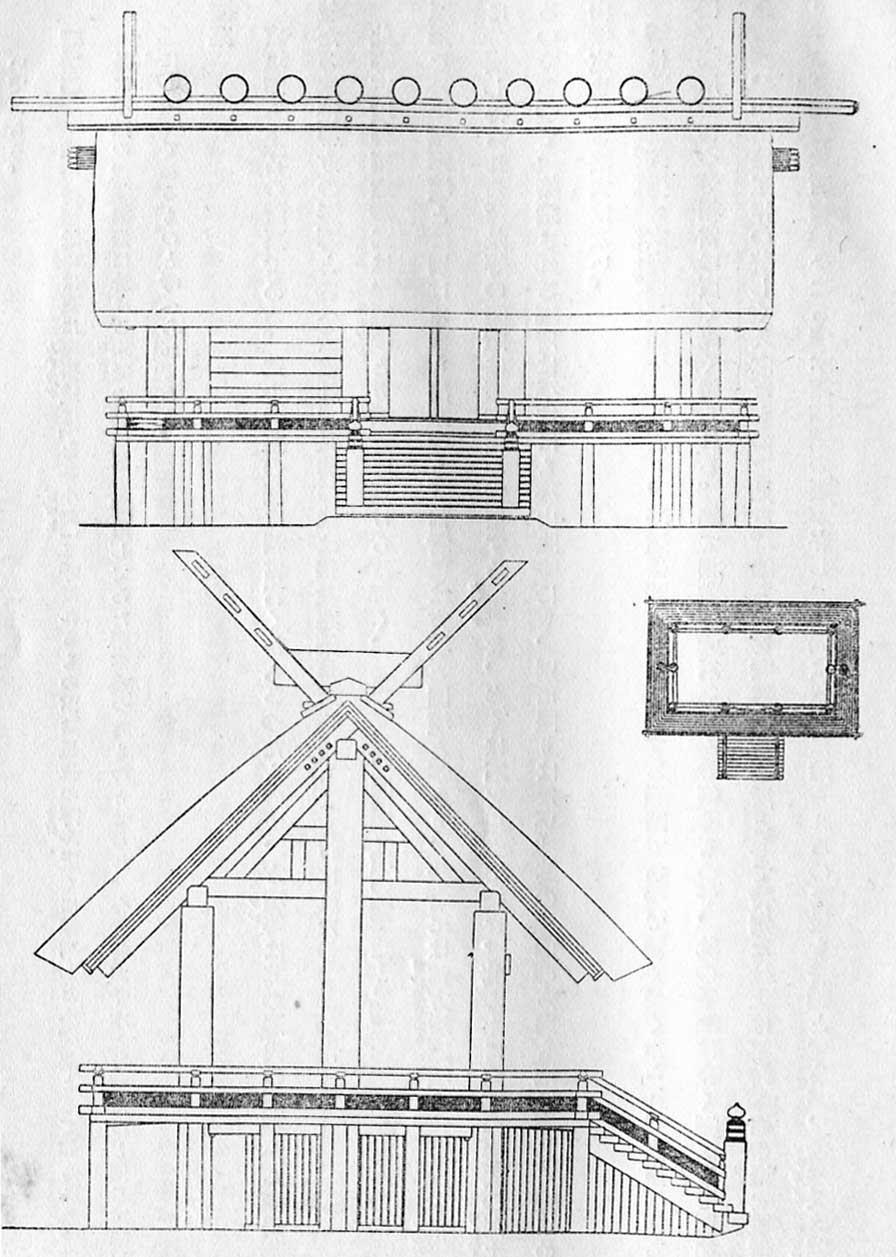
Shinmei-zukuri

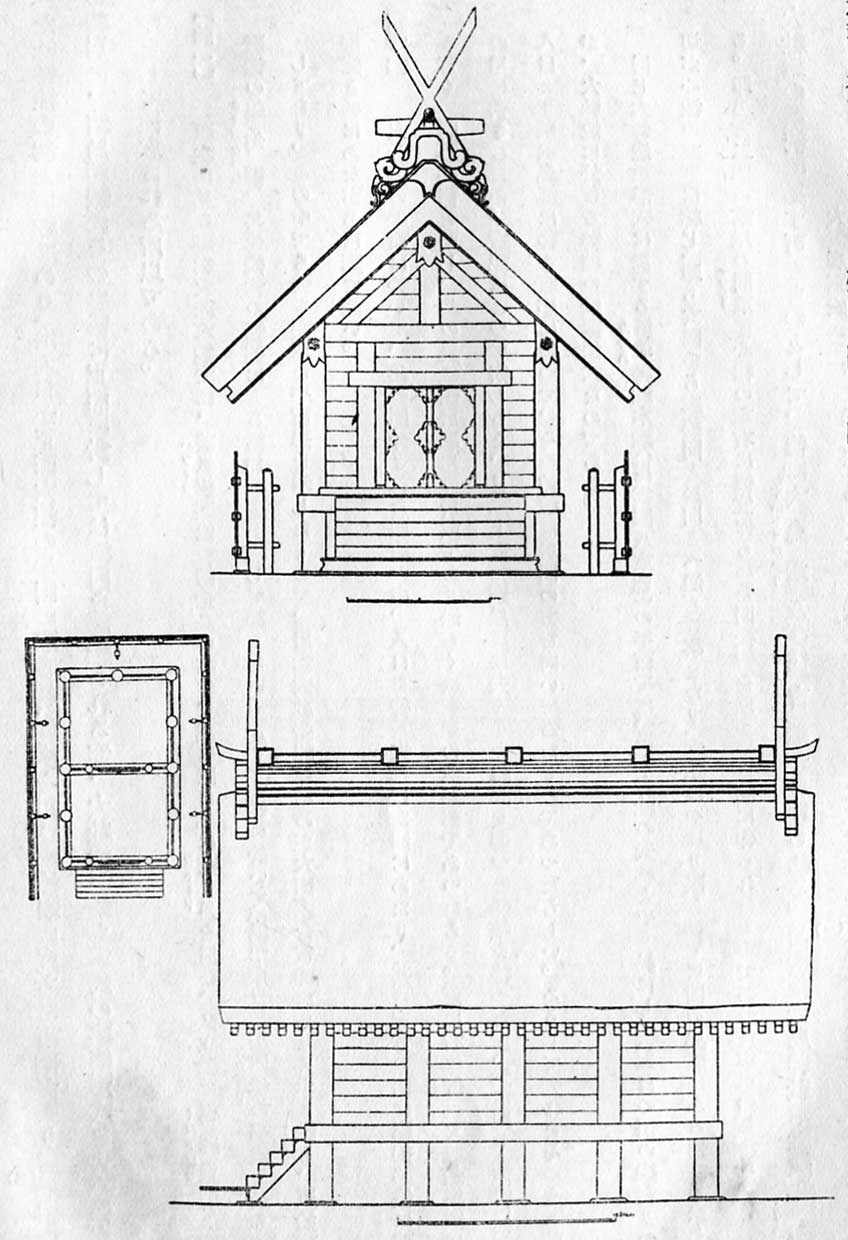
Sumiyoshi-zukuri

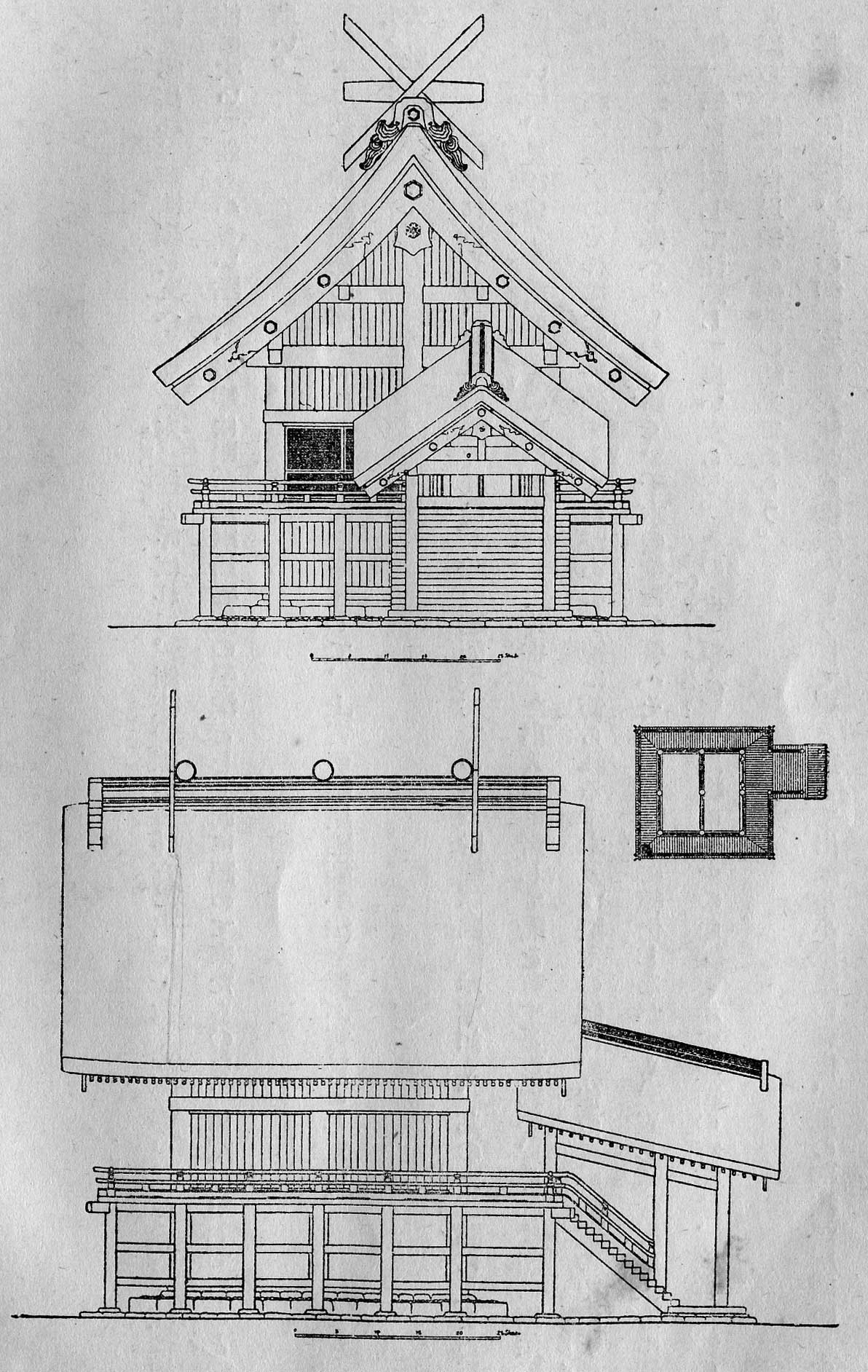
Taisha-zukuri, Izumo Taisha

== See also ==
- Glossary of Shinto
- List of Shinto shrines in Japan
