= List of Tangible Folk Cultural Properties of Japan (Ehime) =

This list is of the Tangible Folk Cultural Properties of Japan in the Prefecture of Ehime.

== National Tangible Folk Cultural Properties ==
As of 1 July 2015, one property has been designated at a national level.

Property	Municipality	Ownership	Comments	Image	Coordinates	Ref.
Wax Working Tools in Uchiko and its Environs 内子及び周辺地域の製蝋用具; Uchiko oyobi shūhen chiiki no seirō yōgu	Uchiko	Uchiko Town (kept at the Kamihaga Residence and Japanese Wax Museum)	1,444 items		33°33′26″N 132°39′14″E	

== Prefectural Tangible Folk Cultural Properties ==
As of 27 March 2015, eight properties have been designated at a prefectural level.

Property	Municipality	Ownership	Comments	Image	Coordinates	Ref.
Iyo Puppet Theatre Ningyō Heads and Costumes 伊予源之丞人形頭・衣裳道具一式; Iyo-gen-no-jō ningyō kashira・ishō dōgu isshiki	Matsuyama	Iyogen-no-jō Preservation Society (伊予源之丞保存会)			33°51′32″N 132°43′38″E	
Ōtani Bunraku Ningyō Heads and Costumes 大谷文楽人形頭、衣裳道具一式; Ōtani bunraku ningyō kashira・ishō dōgu isshiki	Ōzu	Ōtani Bunraku Preservation Society (大谷文楽保存会)			33°26′09″N 132°41′14″E	
Miyuki Bridge 御幸の橋; Miyuki-no-hashi	Ōzu	Ten Jinja (天神社)			33°30′42″N 132°47′46″E	
Asahi Bunraku Ningyō Heads and Costumes 朝日文楽人形頭、衣裳道具一式; Asahi bunraku ningyō kashira・ishō dōgu isshiki	Seiyo				33°22′53″N 132°25′27″E	
Tawarazu Bunraku Ningyō Heads and Costumes 俵津文楽人形頭・衣裳道具一式; Tawarazu bunraku ningyō kashira・ishō dōgu isshiki	Seiyo	Tawarazu Bunraku Preservation Society (俵津文楽保存会)			33°19′36″N 132°29′20″E	
Kihoku Bunraku Ningyō Heads and Costumes 鬼北文楽人形頭・衣裳道具一式; Kihoku bunraku ningyō kashira・ishō dōgu isshiki	Kihoku	private			33°15′06″N 132°41′31″E	
Isaniwa Jinja Sangaku 伊佐爾波神社算額; Isaniwa Jinja sangaku	Matsuyama	Isaniwa Jinja	twenty-two tablets, dating from 1803 to 1937		33°51′02″N 132°47′20″E	
Kotohira Jinja Sangaku 金刀比羅神社算額; Kotohira Jinja sangaku	Ōzu	Ōzu City Museum (大洲市立博物館)	one tablet		33°30′49″N 132°32′46″E	

== Municipal Tangible Folk Cultural Properties ==
As of 1 May 2014, a further seventy properties have been designated at a municipal level.

== Registered Tangible Folk Cultural Properties ==
As of 1 July 2015, zero properties have been registered (as opposed to designated) at a national level.

== See also ==
- Cultural Properties of Japan
- List of Important Tangible Folk Cultural Properties
