= Isaniwa Shrine =

Shinto shrine in Ehime Prefecture, Japan

Isaniwa Shrine (伊佐爾波神社, Isaniwa jinja)
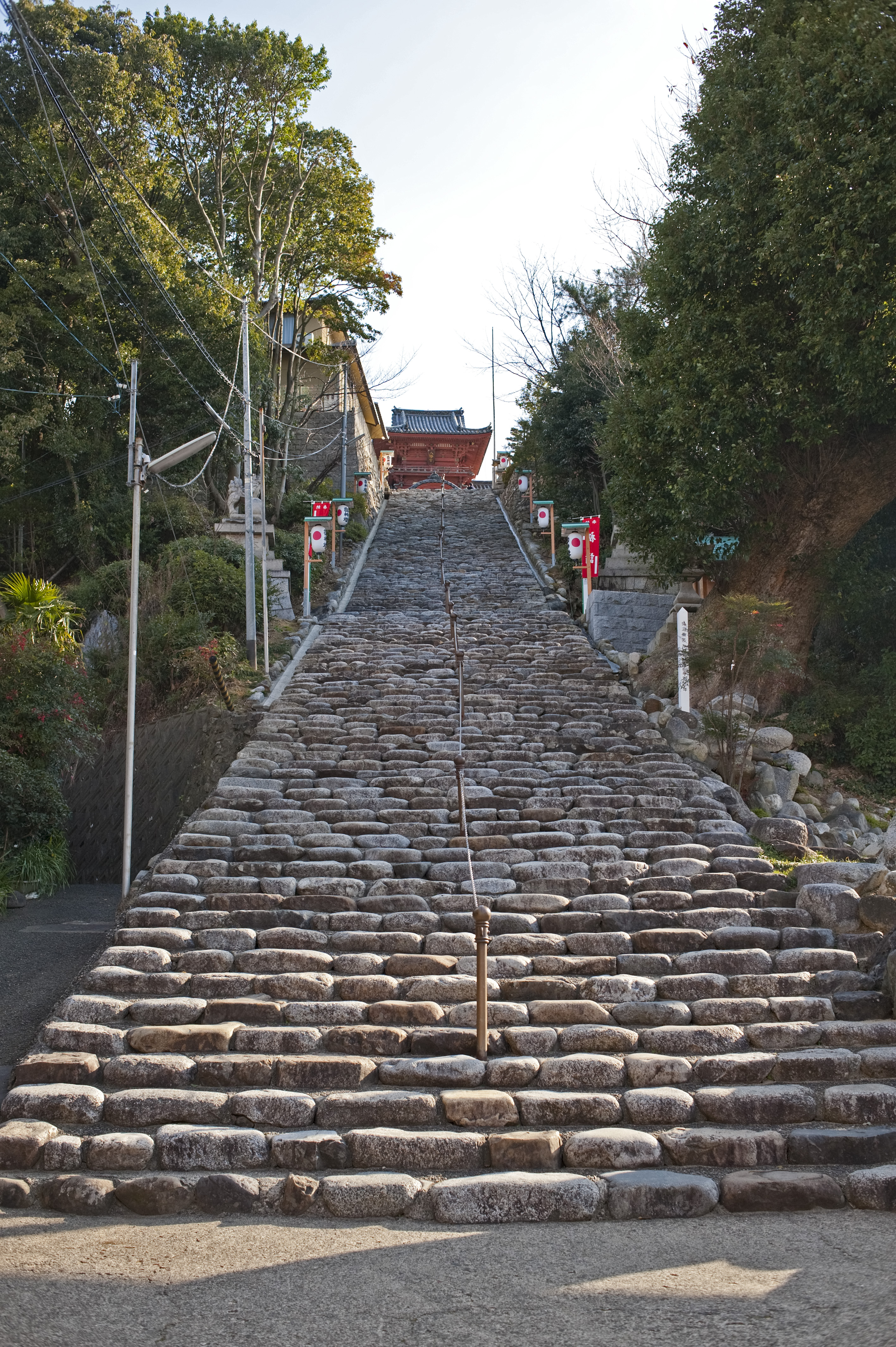
- Approach to Isaniwa Jinja

- Location within Japan

Religion
- Affiliation: Shinto

Location
- Location: Matsuyama, Ehime Prefecture, Japan
- Coordinates: 33°51′02″N 132°47′21″E

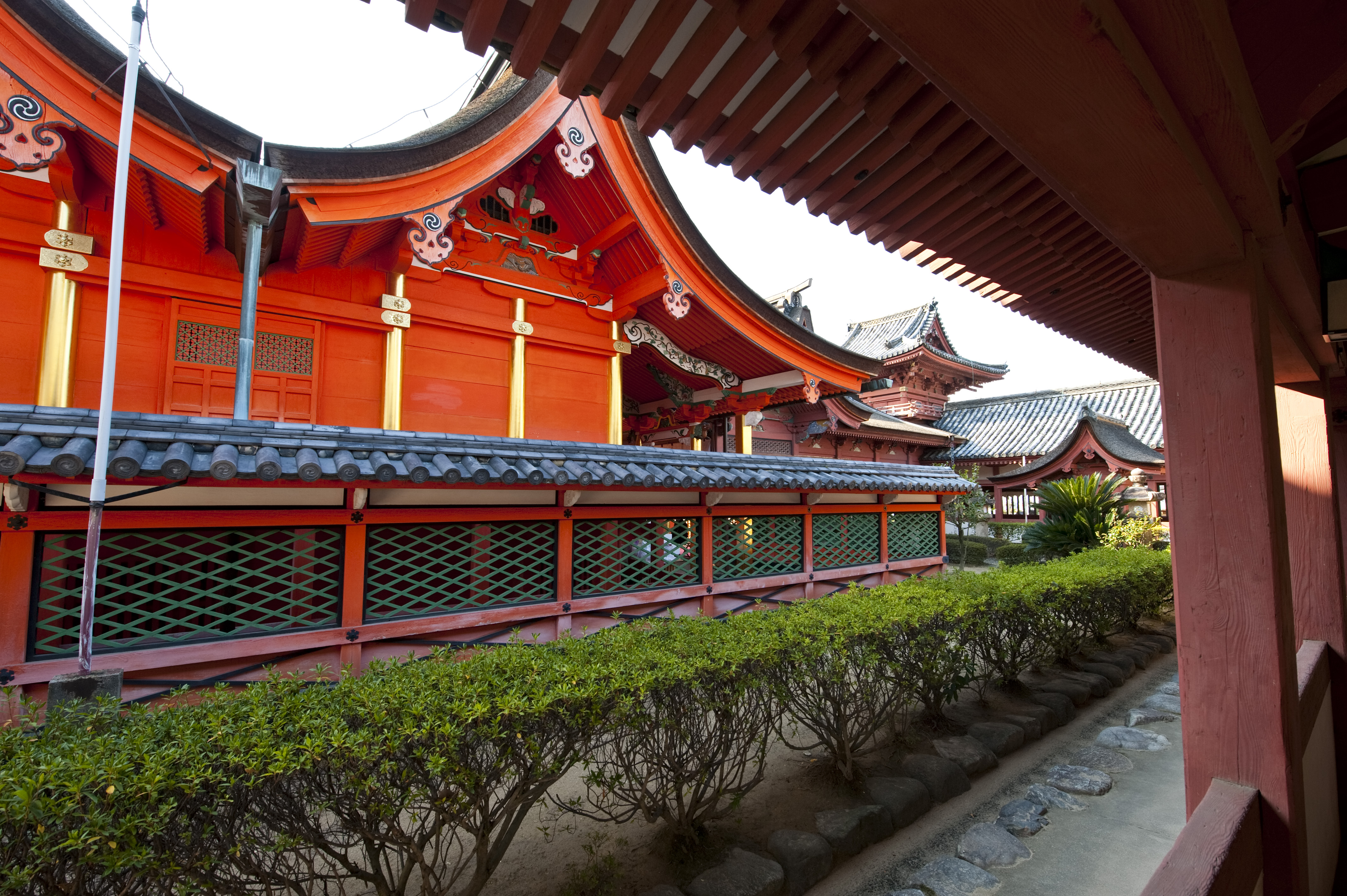
Isaniwa Honden (1667), a rare example of Hachiman-zukuri and an Important Cultural Property

Isaniwa Shrine (伊佐爾波神社, Isaniwa jinja) is a Shinto shrine in Matsuyama, Ehime Prefecture, Japan. Enshrined are Emperor Chūai, Empress Jingū, and Emperor Ōjin. A number of its buildings and treasures have been designated Important Cultural Properties.

== History ==
It is said that the shrine was founded on the site where Emperor Chūai and Empress Jingū bathed at Dōgo Onsen and it is mentioned in Engi shiki. In the fourteenth century the Kōno clan moved the shrine to its present location and it was rebuilt by the Matsudaira clan in the seventeenth century. Isaniwa Jinja was restored in 1970.

== Buildings ==
Vermilion lacquered buildings of Isaniwa Shrine, Matsuyama

Isaniwa Jinja is modelled upon Iwashimizu Hachiman-gū in Kyoto Prefecture and constructed in the Hachiman-zukuri style.

- Honden (1667) (Important Cultural Property)
- Mōshidono corridor (1667) (ICP)
- Rōmon (1667) (ICP)
- Kairō (1667) (ICP)
- Massha (ICP)

== Treasures ==
A treasure hall houses a number of swords and suits of armour.

- Tachi (Kamakura period) (ICP)

== See also ==
- Iwashimizu Hachiman-gū
