= Amanawa Shinmei Shrine =

Shinto shrine in Kanagawa Prefecture, Japan

Amanawa Shinmei Shrine (甘縄神明神社, Amanawa Shinmei Jinja)
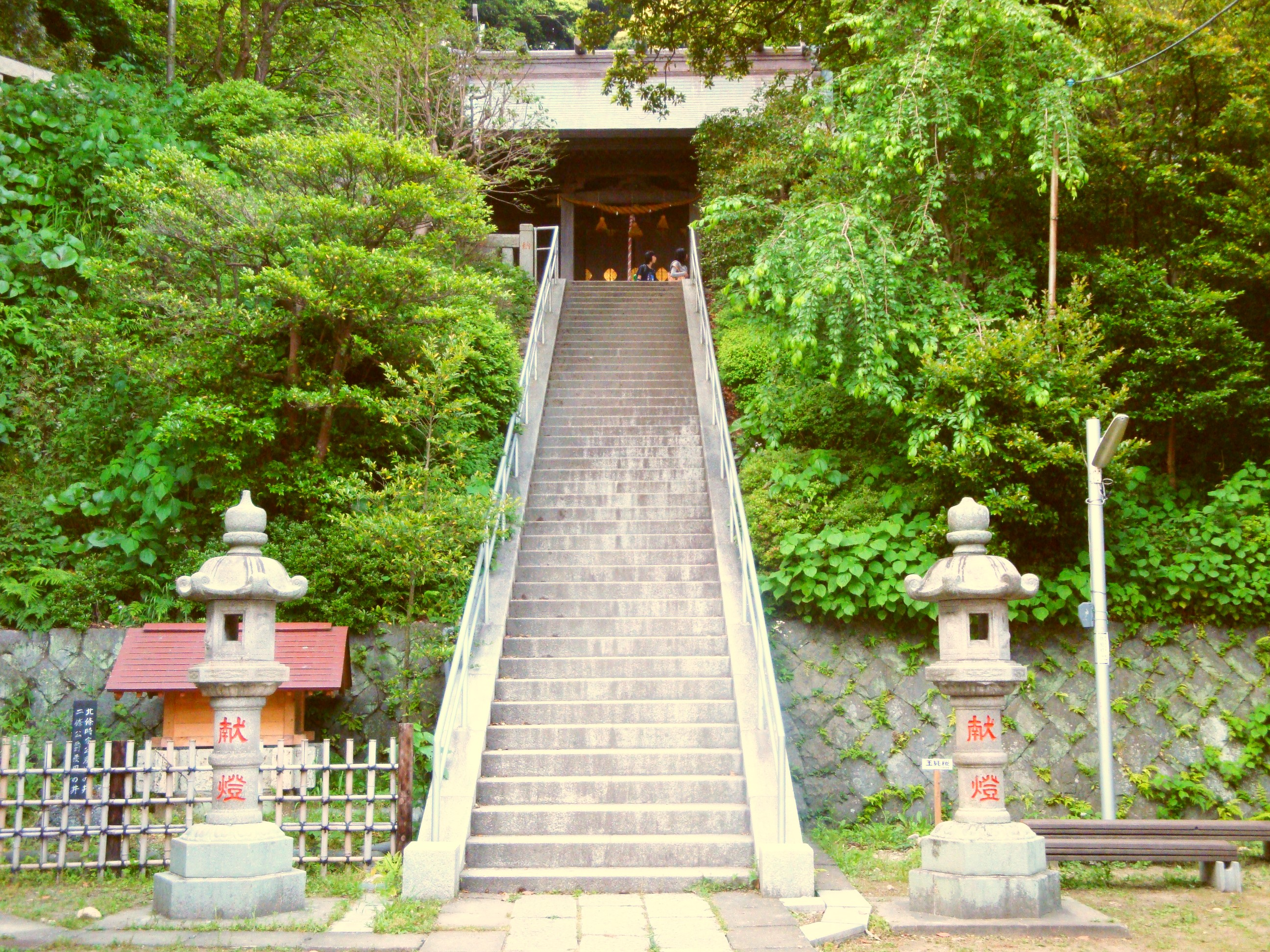
- Stone stairs of Amanawa Shinmei Shrine

- Location within Japan

Religion
- Affiliation: Shinto

Location
- Coordinates: 35.31447°N 139.53704°E

Amanawa Shinmei Shrine (甘縄神明神社, Amanawa Shinmei Jinja) was founded in 710 and is the oldest Shinto shrine in Kamakura. It is dedicated to the sun goddess Amaterasu. According to the ancient document History of Amanawa-ji Shinmei-gū kept by the shrine, the founder of the shrine is famous priest Gyōki; a powerful and rich man named Tokitada Someya supported the construction.

The shrine consists of two structures: the haiden or oratory in the front and the honden or sanctum at the back. Both the oratory and the sanctum have hornlike crossing planks called chigi rising above the roof at both ends. Also five short logs called katsuogi are placed at a right angle along the ridge of the roof. This is typical of a Shinto architectural style called Shinmei-zukuri. As the old structures were destroyed by the 1923 Great Kantō earthquake, they were rebuilt in 1936. The last reconstruction was completed in 1998. The shrine is 10 minutes by walk from Hase Station and 20 minutes by walk from Kamakura Station.

== Gallery ==
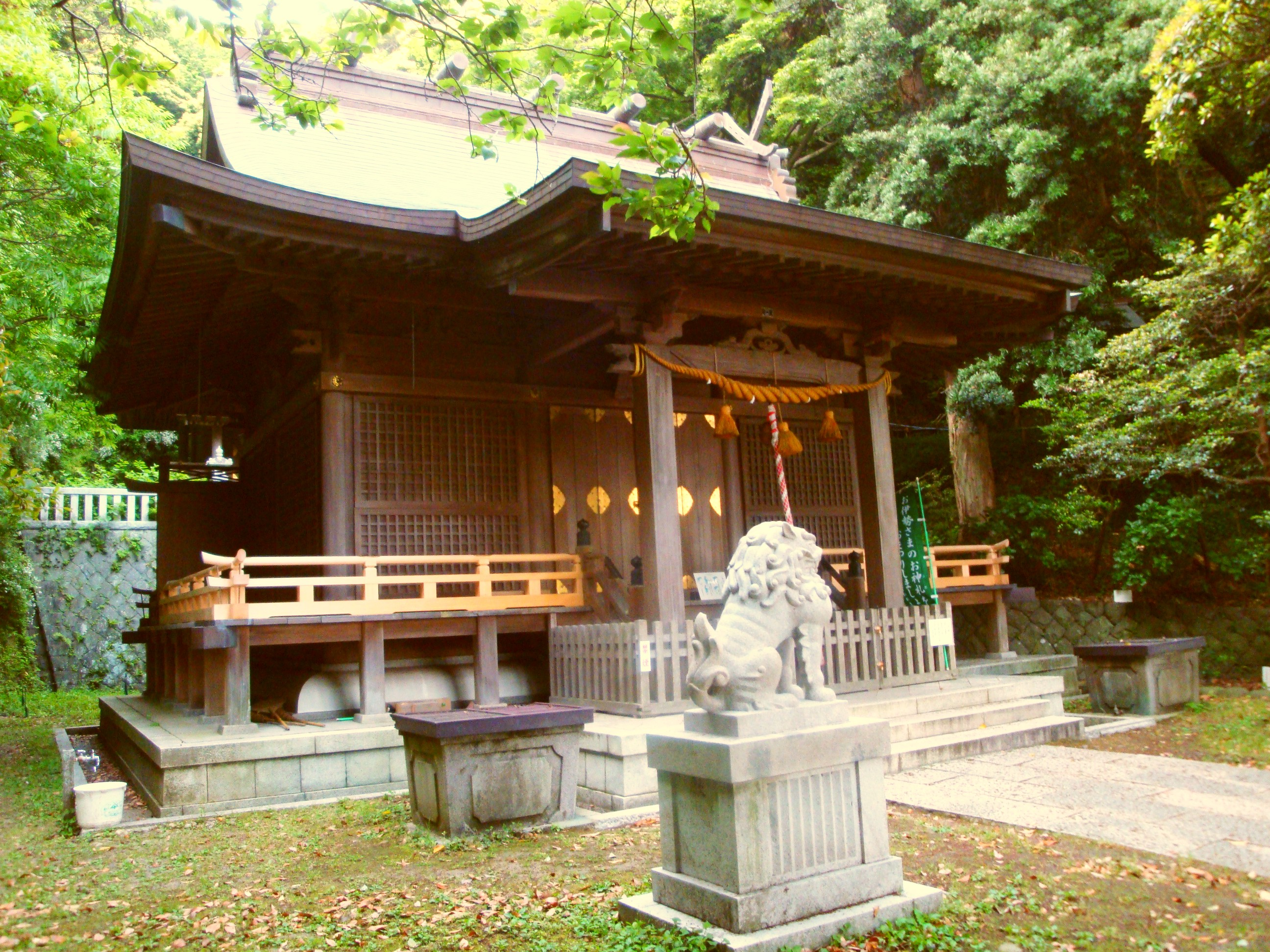
The haiden

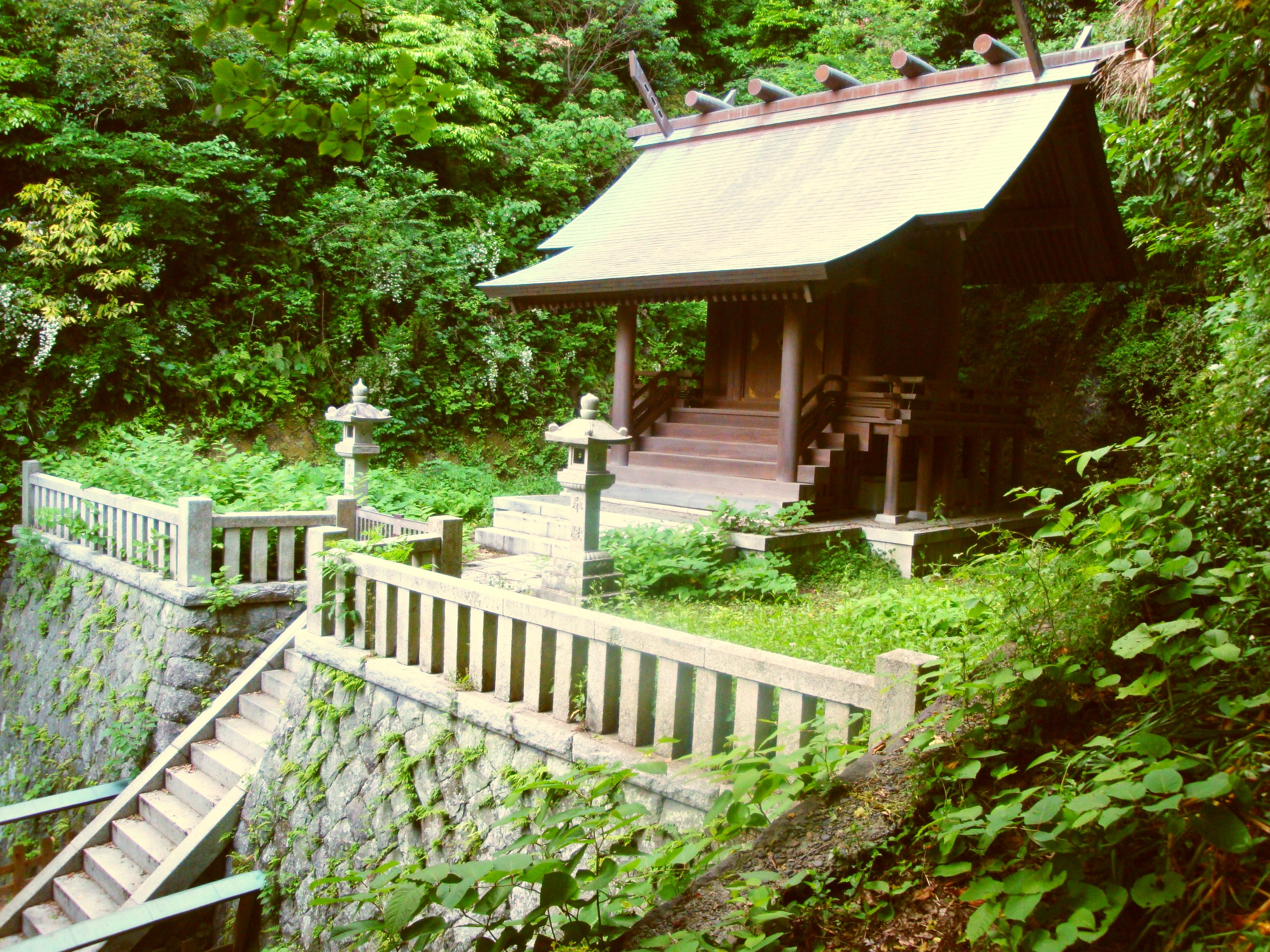
The honden

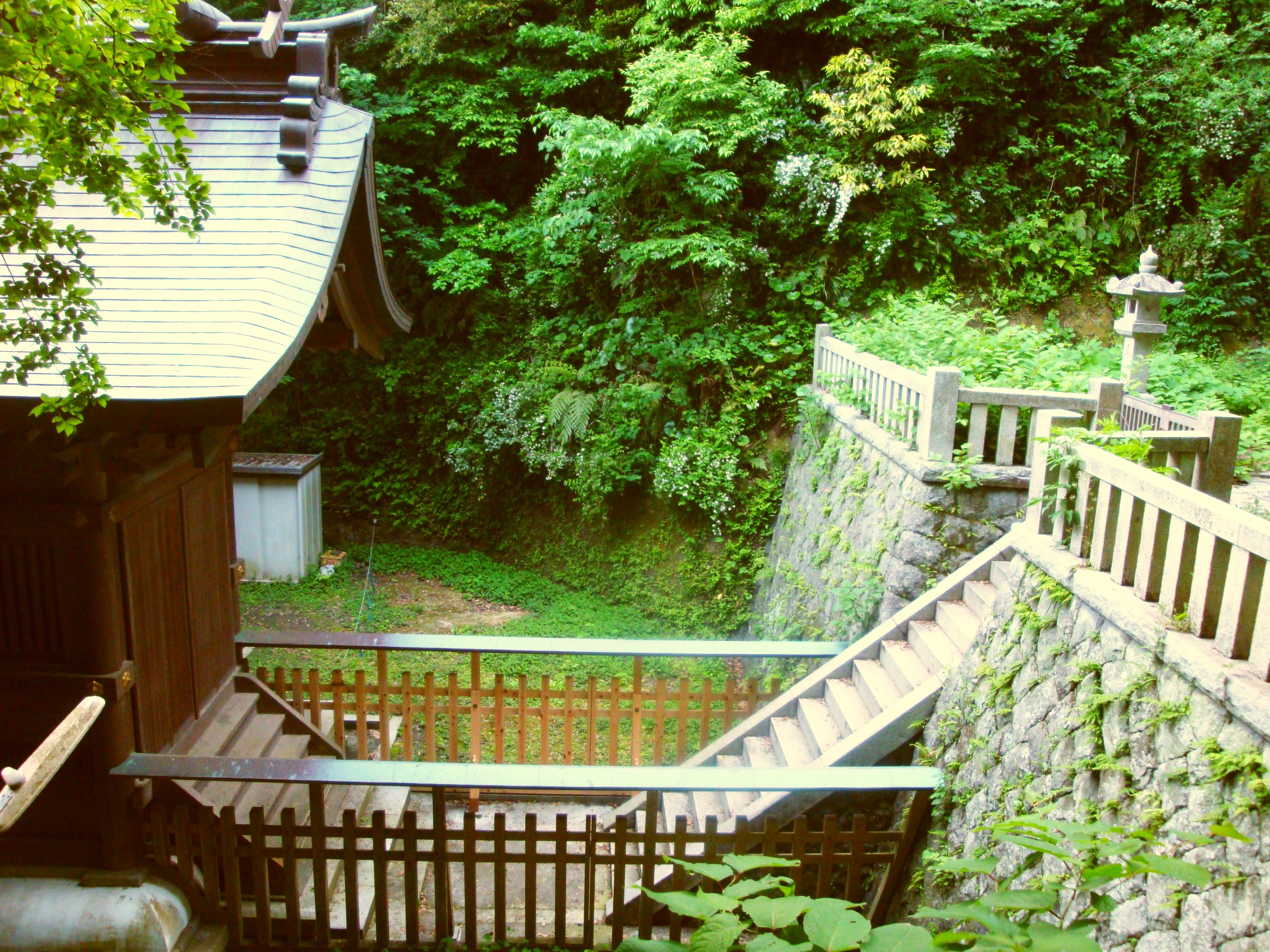
Stairs between the haiden and the honden

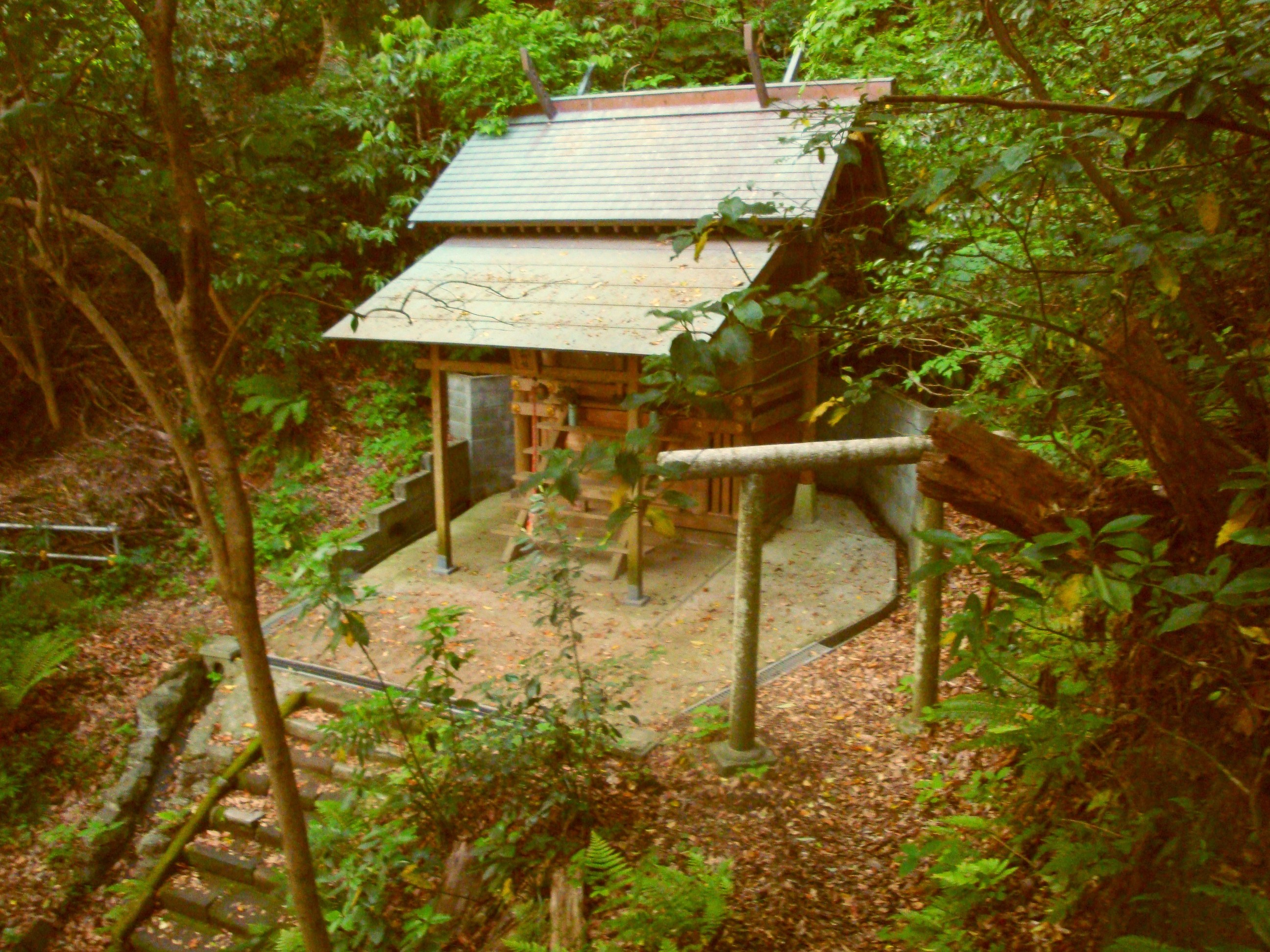
A sessha at the shrine
