= Shinto shrine =

Japanese shrine of the Shinto religion

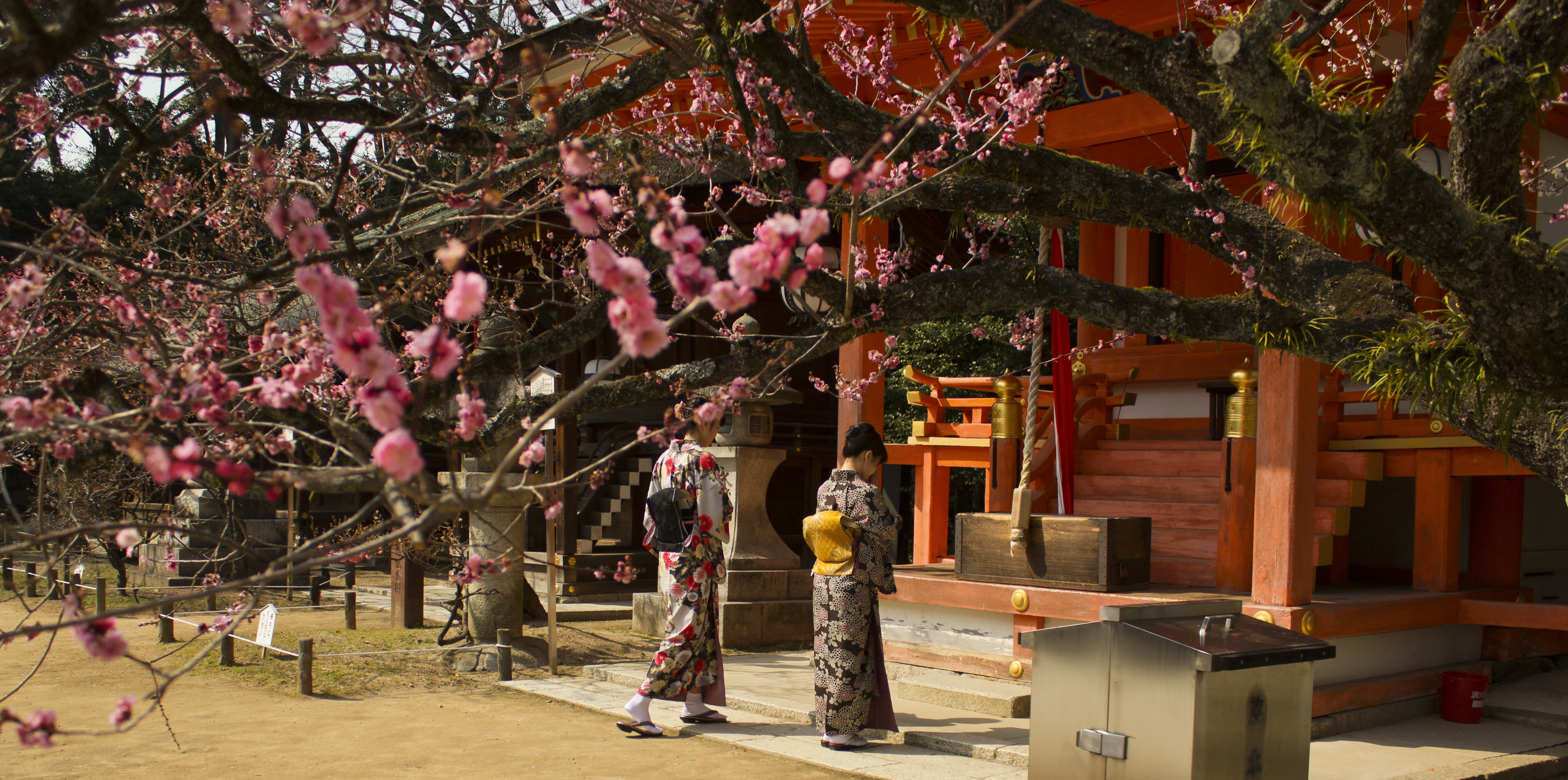
Two women praying in front of a shrine

A Shinto shrine (神社, jinja; archaic: shinsha, meaning: 'kami shrine') is a structure whose main purpose is to house ("enshrine") one or more kami, the deities of the Shinto religion.

The main hall (本殿, honden) (Note: Also called the shinden (神殿).) is where a shrine's patron kami is or are enshrined. The honden may be absent in cases where a shrine stands on or near a sacred mountain, tree, or other object which can be worshipped directly or in cases where a shrine possesses either an altar-like structure, called a himorogi, or an object believed to be capable of attracting spirits, called a yorishiro, which can also serve as direct bonds to a kami. There may be a hall of worship (拝殿, haiden) and other structures as well.

Although only one word ("shrine") is used in English, in Japanese, Shinto shrines may carry any one of many different, non-equivalent names like gongen, -gū, jinja, jingū, mori, myōjin, -sha, taisha, ubusuna, or yashiro. Miniature shrines (hokora) can occasionally be found on roadsides. Large shrines sometimes have on their precincts miniature shrines, sessha (摂社) or massha (末社). (Note: Because the sessha and massha once had different meanings but are now synonymous, these shrines are sometimes called setsumatsusha (摂末社), a neologism that fuses the two old names.) Mikoshi, the palanquins which are carried on poles during festivals (matsuri), also enshrine kami and are therefore considered shrines.

In 927 CE, the Engishiki was promulgated. This work listed all of the 2,861 Shinto shrines existing at the time, and the 3,131 official-recognized and enshrined kami. In 1972, the Agency for Cultural Affairs placed the number of shrines at 79,467, mostly affiliated with the Association of Shinto Shrines. Some shrines, such as the Yasukuni Shrine, are totally independent of any outside authority. The number of Shinto shrines in Japan is estimated to be around 100,000.

Since ancient times, the shake families dominated Shinto shrines through hereditary positions, and at some shrines the hereditary succession continues to present day.

The Unicode character representing a Shinto shrine (for example, on maps) is U+26E9 ⛩ SHINTO SHRINE.

== Etymology ==
Etymology of Jinja from oracle bone characters

Jinja (神社) is the most general word for a Shinto shrine. Any place that has a honden (本殿) is a jinja. The word jinja used to have two more readings, kamu-tsu-yashiro and mori, both of which are kun'yomi readings and mean 'kami grove'. Both of these older readings can be found, for example, in the Man'yōshū.

Sha (社), the second character in jinja (神社) by itself, was not initially a secular term. Historically, in Chinese, it could refer to a Tudigong or 'soil god', a kind of tutelary deity seen as subordinate to the City Gods. Such deities are also often called shèshén (社神) or shénshè (神社). The kun'yomi reading of sha, yashiro, is a generic term for a Shinto shrine, much like jinja. Sha or, occasionally, ja can also be used as a suffix, as in Shinmei-sha or Tenjin-ja. As a suffix, this indicates a minor shrine that has received a kami from a more important shrine through the kanjō process.

Mori (杜; lit. 'grove') are places where kami are present. These places can therefore be shrines and, in fact, 神社, 社 and 杜 can all be read as mori. This reading reflects the fact that the first shrines were simply sacred groves or forests where kami were present.

Hokora or hokura (神庫) are extremely small shrines like the ones that can be found, for example, along country roads. The term hokora (祠), believed to have been one of the first words for a Shinto shrine, evolved from the word hokura (神庫; lit. 'kami repository'). This fact seems to indicate that the first shrines were huts built to house yorishiro. (Note: Yorishiro (依り代; lit. 'approach substitute') were tools conceived to attract the kami and give them a physical space to occupy, thus making them accessible to human beings.)

-gū (宮) indicates a shrine enshrining an imperial prince. However, there are many instances where it is used simply as a tradition. The word gū (宮), often found at the end of shrine names such as Hachimangū, Tenmangū, or Jingū (神宮), comes from the Chinese word gong (宮), meaning 'a palace or a temple to a high deity'.

A jingū (神宮) is a shrine of particularly high status that has a deep relationship with the Imperial household or enshrines an Emperor. This is the case for both Ise Jingū and Meiji Jingū. Jingū alone, however, only refers to Ise Jingū, whose official name is just that. It is a formulation close to jinja (神社), with the character sha (社) being replaced with gū (宮) to emphasize its high rank.

Miya (宮), the kun'yomi reading of -gū, indicates a shrine that is enshrining a special kami or a member of the Imperial household like the Empress. However, there are many examples, much like with -gū, in which it is used simply as a tradition. During the period of state regulation, many shrines changed the -miya in their names to jinja.

A taisha or ōyashiro (大社; lit. 'great shrine') is a shrine that was classified as such under the old system of shrine ranking, the shakaku (社格), which was abolished in 1946. Many shrines carrying that shōgō or 'title' adopted it only after the war.

A chinjusha (鎮守社・鎮社; tutelary shrine) is a shrine housing a tutelary kami that protects a given area, village, building, or Buddhist temple. The word chinjusha comes from the words chinju (鎮守・鎮; guardian) and sha (社; shrine).

Setsumatsusha (摂末社) is a combination of two words: sessha (摂社; auxiliary shrine) and massha (末社; undershrine). They are also called eda-miya (枝宮; branch shrines).

During the Japanese Middle Ages, shrines started being called gongen (権現), a term of Buddhist origin. For example, in Eastern Japan, there are still many Hakusan shrines where the shrine itself is called gongen. Because it represents the application of Buddhist terminology to Shinto kami, its use was legally abolished by the Meiji government with the Shinto and Buddhism Separation Order (神仏判然令, Shin-butsu Hanzenrei), and shrines began to be called jinja.

== History ==
=== Early origins ===
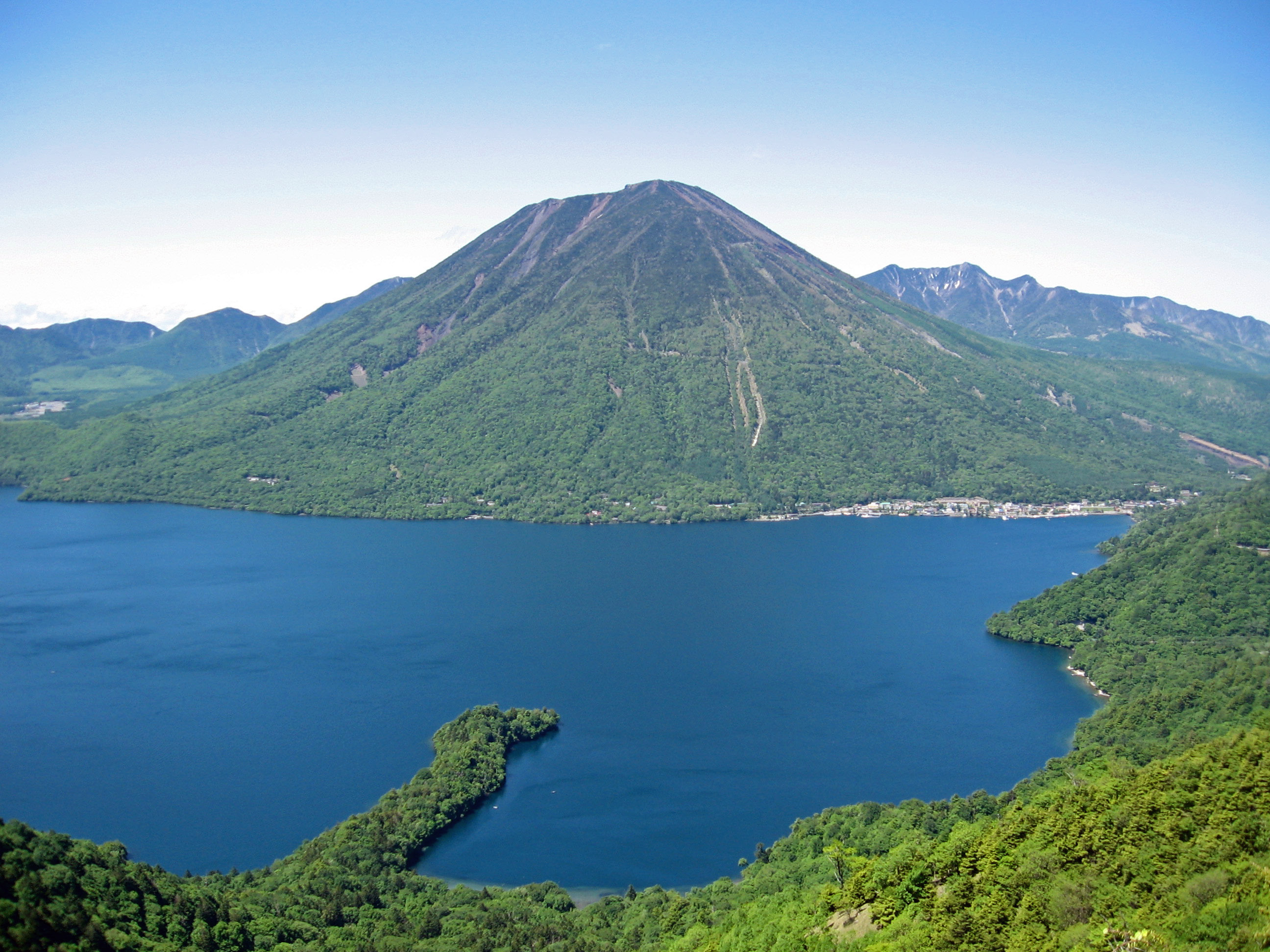
Mount Nantai, worshiped at Futarasan Shrine, has the shape of the phallic stone rods found in pre-agricultural Jōmon sites.

Ancestors are kami to be worshipped. Yayoi period village councils sought the advice of ancestors and other kami, and developed instruments, yorishiro, to evoke them. These were conceived to attract the kami and allow them physical space, thus making kami accessible to human beings.

Village council sessions were held in quiet spots in the mountains or in forests near great trees or other natural objects that served as yorishiro. These sacred places and their yorishiro gradually evolved into today's shrines, whose origins can be still seen in the Japanese words for "mountain" and "forest", which can also mean "shrine". Many shrines have on their grounds one of the original great yorishiro: a big tree, surrounded by a sacred rope called a shimenawa. (Note: Many other sacred objects (mirrors, swords, comma-shaped jewels called magatama) were originally yorishiro, and only later became kami by association)

The first buildings at places dedicated to worship were hut-like structures built to house some yorishiro. A trace of this origin can be found in the term hokura (神庫; lit. 'deity storehouse'), which evolved into hokora (written identically) and is considered to be one of the first words for shrine. (Note: Today, a hokora is an extremely small shrine, like those seen on the sides of many roads.)

=== First temporary shrines ===
True shrines arose with the beginning of agriculture, when the need arose to attract kami to ensure good harvests. These were, however, just temporary structures built for a particular purpose, a tradition whose traces can still be found in rituals such as the otabisho, a temporary resting place set up during a matsuri procession, where the kami's portable palanquin (mikoshi or shin'yo) is housed for a set period, ranging from brief to extended, before returning to its permanent shrine.

Hints of the first shrines can still be found. Ōmiwa Shrine in Nara, for example, contains no sacred images or objects because it is believed to serve the mountain on which it stands—images or objects are therefore unnecessary. For the same reason, it has a worship hall, a haiden (拝殿), but no place to house the kami, a shinden (神殿). Archeology confirms that, during the Yayoi period, the most common shintai, a yorishiro actually housing the enshrined kami, in the earliest shrines were nearby mountain peaks that supplied stream water to the plains where people lived.

Besides Ōmiwa Shrine, another important example is Mount Nantai, a phallus-shaped mountain in Nikko which constitutes Futarasan Shrine's shintai. The name Nantai (男体) means 'man's body'. The mountain provides water to the rice paddies below and has the shape of the phallic stone rods found in pre-agricultural Jōmon sites.

=== First known shrine ===
The first known Shinto shrine was built in roughly 478.

=== Rites and ceremonies ===
In 905 CE, Emperor Daigo ordered a compilation of Shinto rites and rules. Previous attempts at codification are known to have taken place, but, neither the Konin nor the Jogan Gishiki survive. Initially under the direction of Fujiwara no Tokihira, the project stalled at his death in April 909. Fujiwara no Tadahira, his brother, took charge and, in 927, the Engishiki was promulgated in fifty volumes.

This, the first formal codification of Shinto rites and norito (liturgies and prayers) to survive, became the basis for all subsequent Shinto liturgical practice and efforts. In addition to the first ten volumes of this fifty volume work, which concerned worship and the Department of Worship, sections in subsequent volumes addressing the Ministry of Ceremonies and the Ministry of the Imperial Household regulated Shinto worship and contained liturgical rites and regulation. In 1970, Felicia Gressitt Brock published a two-volume annotated English language translation of the first ten volumes with an introduction entitled Engi-shiki; procedures of the Engi Era.

=== State Integration ===
State integration of Shinto began in the 7th and 8th centuries during the Ritsuryō and early Heian periods. During this era, indigenous rituals and shrine architecture were formally incorporated into the Japanese governmental hierarchy. During the Ritsuryō period, the Taihō Code was written under the reigns of Emperor Tenmu (672–686) and Empress Jitō (687–697) and was implemented in 701, marking the initial institutionalization of Shinto in Japan and forming one of the first legal codes that structured the religion. This code, along with its many revisions, including the Yōrō Code, formed the Ritsuryō System that defined the Ritsuryō period. Under the Ritsuryō System, one of the two major branches of the Japanese government was the Department of Divinities. This department defined the structure of shrines and rituals through the Ritsuryō Codes. As part of the Yōrō Code, 19 rituals of 13 categories were established, including the following:

- Chinka-sai (鎮火祭; also read hi/ho shizume no matsuri) was a fire prevention rite, established under the Ritsuryō system to prevent fires in imperial palace and other state facilities rather than the prevention of fires in general. It was performed on the last day of the sixth and twelfth months of the lunar calendar within the imperial palace; often in conjunction with Ōharae.
- Chinka-sai (鎮花祭; also read hana shizume no matsuri) was a sickness prevention rite performed during the third lunar month. It was believed that when blossoms fell in the springtime, epidemic gods (疫神, ekishin; deities believed to spread disease) would set out and spread illnesses across the nation. Official rites were performed at the Ōmiwa Shrine and Sai Shrine. Similar practices were also performed among the general public.
- Kinen-sai was a rite performed on the fourth day of the second lunar month to pray for a good harvest. Unlike the Chinka-sai rites, Kinen-sai was imperially administered nationally and performed at the 3,132 shrines recorded in Jinmyochō. Established in 675 as a rite of the Ritsuryō state, it was largely based on a similar Chinese field-sowing rite. In 798, shrines were categorized as either imperially administered shrines (Jingikan saijin) or provincially endowed shrines (kokushi saiki nenshi). This rite was performed at Jingikan saijin, and while the emperor himself wouldn't participate, it was attended by head officials of the Department of Divinities. Similar to other palace rituals, Kinen-sai died out toward the end of the Muromachi period as a result of military conflict.

== Arrival and influence of Buddhism ==
The arrival of Buddhism in Japan in around the sixth century introduced the concept of a permanent shrine. A great number of Buddhist temples were built next to existing shrines in mixed complexes called jingū-ji to help priesthood deal with local kami, making those shrines permanent. Some time in their evolution, the word miya (宮), meaning 'palace', came into use, indicating that shrines had, by then, become the imposing structures of today.

Once the first permanent shrines were built, Shinto revealed a strong tendency to resist architectural change, a tendency which manifested itself in the so-called shikinen sengū-sai (式年遷宮祭), the tradition of rebuilding shrines faithfully at regular intervals, adhering strictly to their original design. This custom is the reason ancient styles have been replicated throughout the centuries to the present day, remaining more or less intact.

Ise Grand Shrine, still rebuilt every 20 years, is its best extant example. In Shinto, it has played a particularly significant role in preserving ancient architectural styles. Izumo Taisha, Sumiyoshi Taisha, and Nishina Shinmei Shrine each represent a different style whose origin is believed to predate Buddhism in Japan. These three styles are known respectively as taisha-zukuri, sumiyoshi-zukuri, and shinmei-zukuri.

Shrines show various influences, particularly that of Buddhism, a cultural import which provided much of Shinto architecture's vocabulary. The rōmon, (Note: The rōmon, or 'tower gate', is a gate which looks like a two-story gate, but in fact is only one story.) the haiden, the kairō, the tōrō, or 'stone lantern', and the komainu, or 'lion dogs', are all elements borrowed from Buddhism.

=== Shinbutsu shūgō and the jingūji ===
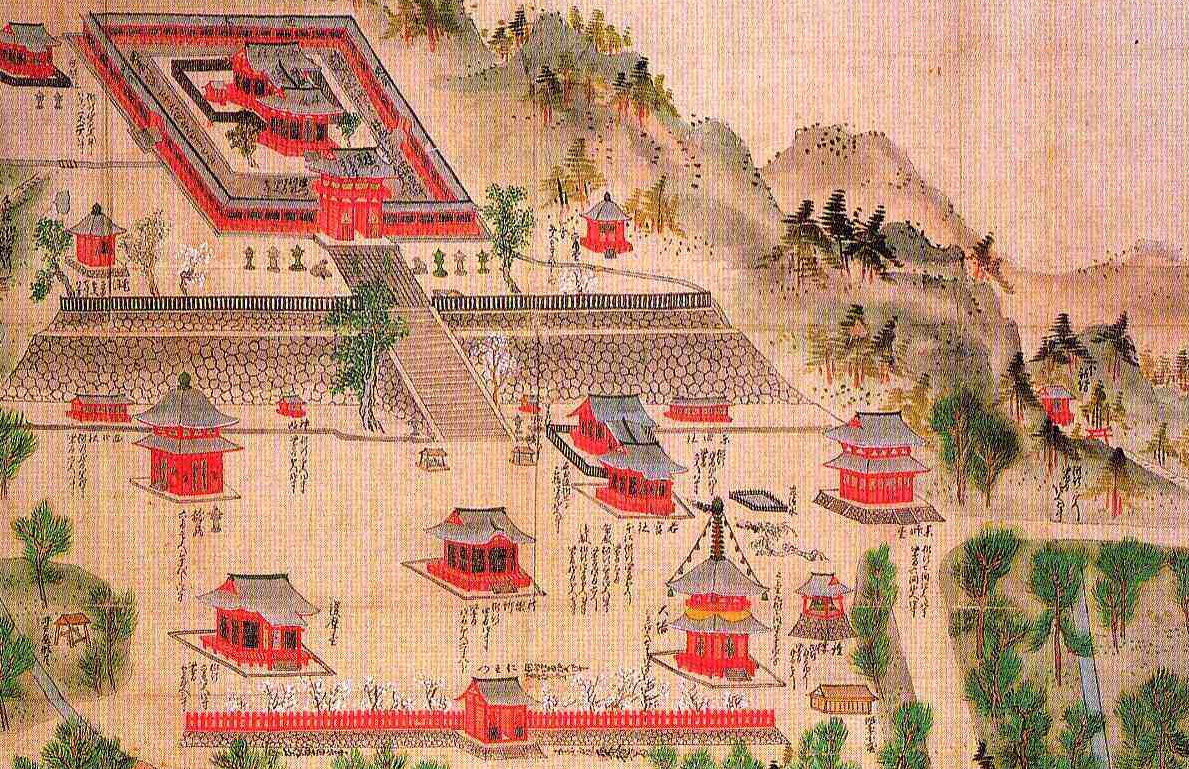
An example of jingū-ji: Tsurugaoka Hachiman-gū-ji in an old drawing. In the foreground the shrine-temple's Buddhist structures (not extant), among them a pagoda, a belltower and a niōmon. The shrine (extant) is above.

Until the Meiji period (1868–1912), shrines as they exist today were rare. With very few exceptions like Ise Grand Shrine and Izumo Taisha, they were just a part of a temple-shrine complex controlled by Buddhist clergy. These complexes were called jingū-ji, places of worship composed of a Buddhist temple and of a shrine dedicated to a local kami.

The complexes were born when a temple was erected next to a shrine to help its kami with its karmic problems. At the time, kami were thought to be also subjected to karma, and therefore in need of a salvation only Buddhism could provide. Having first appeared during the Nara period (710–794), the jingū-ji remained common for over a millennium until, with few exceptions, they were destroyed in compliance with the new policies of the Meiji administration in 1868.

=== Shinbutsu bunri ===
The Shinto shrine went through a massive change when the Meiji administration promulgated a new policy of separation of kami and foreign Buddhas (shinbutsu bunri) with the Kami and Buddhas Separation Order (神仏判然令, Shinbutsu Hanzenrei). This event triggered the haibutsu kishaku, a violent anti-Buddhist movement which in the final years of the Tokugawa shogunate and during the Meiji Restoration caused the forcible closure of thousands of Buddhist temples, the confiscation of their land, the forced return to lay life of monks, and the destruction of books, statues and other Buddhist property.

Until the end of Edo period, local kami beliefs and Buddhism were intimately connected in what was called shinbutsu shūgō, up to the point where even the same buildings were used as both Shinto shrines and Buddhist temples.

After the law, the two would be forcibly separated. This was done in several stages. At first, an order issued by the Jingijimuka in April 1868 ordered the defrocking of shasō and bettō (shrine monks performing Buddhist rites at Shinto shrines). A few days later, the Daijō-kan banned the application of Buddhist terminology such as gongen to Japanese kami and the veneration of Buddhist statues in shrines.

The third stage consisted of the prohibition against applying the Buddhist term Daibosatsu (Great Bodhisattva) to the syncretic kami Hachiman at the Iwashimizu Hachiman-gū and Usa Hachiman-gū shrines. In the fourth and final stage, all the defrocked bettō and shasō were told to become Shinto priests and return to their shrines. Monks of the Nichiren sect were told not to refer to some deities as kami.

After a short period in which it enjoyed popular favor, the process of separation of Buddhas and kami however stalled and is still only partially completed. To this day, almost all Buddhist temples in Japan have a small shrine (chinjusha) dedicated to its Shinto tutelary kami, and vice versa Buddhist figures (e.g. goddess Kannon) are revered in Shinto shrines.

== Shintai ==
Mount Fuji is Japan's most famous shintai.

The defining features of a shrine are the kami it enshrines and the shintai (or go-shintai if the honorific prefix go- is used) that houses it. While the name literally means 'body of a kami', shintai are physical objects worshiped at or near Shinto shrines because a kami is believed to reside in them. Shintai are not themselves part of kami, but rather just symbolic repositories which make them accessible to human beings for worship; the kami inhabits them. Shintai are also of necessity yorishiro, that is objects by their very nature capable of attracting kami.

The most common shintai are objects like mirrors, swords, jewels (for example comma-shaped stones called magatama), gohei (wands used during religious rites), and sculptures of kami called shinzō (神像), (Note: Kami are, as a rule, not represented in anthropomorphic or physical terms, however numerous paintings and statues representing them have appeared under Buddhist influence.) but they can be also natural objects such as rocks, mountains, trees, and waterfalls. Mountains were among the first, and are still among the most important, shintai, and are worshiped at several famous shrines. A mountain believed to house a kami, as for example Mount Fuji or Mount Miwa, is called a shintai-zan (神体山). In the case of a man-made shintai, a kami must be invited to reside in it.

The founding of a new shrine requires the presence of either a pre-existing, naturally occurring shintai (for example a rock or waterfall housing a local kami), or of an artificial one, which must therefore be procured or made to the purpose. An example of the first case are the Nachi Falls, worshiped at Hiryū Shrine near Kumano Nachi Taisha and believed to be inhabited by a kami called Hiryū Gongen.

The first duty of a shrine is to house and protect its shintai and the kami which inhabits it. If a shrine has more than one building, the one containing the shintai is called the honden; because it is meant for the exclusive use of the kami, it is always closed to the public and is not used for prayer or religious ceremonies. The shintai leaves the honden only during festivals (matsuri), when it is put in portable shrines (mikoshi) and carried around the streets among the faithful. The portable shrine is used to physically protect the shintai and to hide it from sight.

=== Re-enshrinement ===
Often, the opening of a new shrine will require the ritual division of a kami and the transferring of one of the two resulting spirits to the new location, where it will animate the shintai. This process is called kanjō, and the divided spirits bunrei (分霊; lit. 'divided spirit'), go-bunrei (御分霊), or wakemitama (分霊). This process of propagation, described by the priests, in spite of this name, not as a division but as akin to the lighting of a candle from another already lit, leaves the original kami intact in its original place and therefore does not alter any of its properties. The resulting spirit has all the qualities of the original and is therefore "alive" and permanent. The process is used often—for example during Shinto festivals (matsuri) to animate temporary shrines called mikoshi.

The transfer does not necessarily take place from a shrine to another: the divided spirit's new location can be a privately owned object or an individual's house. The kanjō process was of fundamental importance in the creation of all of Japan's shrine networks (Inari shrines, Hachiman shrines, etc.).

== Shake families ==
The shake are families and the former social class that dominated Shinto shrines through hereditary positions within a shrine. The social class was abolished in 1871, but many shake families still continue hereditary succession until present day and some were appointed hereditary nobility (Kazoku) after the Meiji Restoration.

Some of the most well-known shake families include:

- Arakida and Watarai of Ise Grand Shrine
- Senge and Kitajima of Izumo Taisha
- Ōnakatomi of Kasuga Taisha
- Urabe of Yoshida Shrine

== Famous shrines and shrine networks ==
Those worshiped at a shrine are generally Shinto kami, but sometimes they can be Buddhist or Taoist deities, as well as others not generally considered to belong to Shinto. (Note: The opposite can also happen. Toyokawa Inari is a Buddhist temple of the Sōtō sect in Toyokawa, Aichi Prefecture and, with its Akasaka branch, one of the centers of Inari's cult.) Some shrines were established to worship living people or figures from myths and legends. An example is the Tōshō-gū shrines erected to enshrine Tokugawa Ieyasu, or the many shrines dedicated to Sugawara no Michizane, like Kitano Tenman-gū.

Izumo-taisha

Often, the shrines which were most significant historically do not lie in a former center of power like Kyoto, Nara, or Kamakura. For example, Ise Grand Shrine, the Imperial household's family shrine, is in Mie prefecture. Izumo-taisha, one of the oldest and most revered shrines in Japan, is in Shimane Prefecture. This is because their location is that of a traditionally important kami, and not that of temporal institutions.

Some shrines exist only in one locality, while others are at the head of a network of branch shrines (分社, bunsha). The spreading of a kami can be evoked by one or more of several different mechanisms. The typical one is an operation called kanjō, a propagation process through which a kami is invited to a new location and there re-enshrined. The new shrine is administered completely independent from the one it originated from.

However, other transfer mechanisms exist. In Ise Grand Shrine's case, for example, its network of Shinmei shrines (from Shinmei (神明), another name for Amaterasu) grew due to two concurrent causes. During the late Heian period the cult of Amaterasu, worshiped initially only at Ise Grand Shrine, started to spread to the shrine's possessions through the usual kanjō mechanism.

Later, branch shrines started to appear further away. The first evidence of a Shinmei shrine far from Ise is given by the Azuma Kagami, a Kamakura-period text which refers to Amanawa Shinmei-gū's appearance in Kamakura, Kanagawa. Amaterasu began to be worshiped in other parts of the country because of the so-called tobi shinmei (飛び神明, flying Shinmei) phenomenon, the belief that she would fly to other locations and settle there. Similar mechanisms have been responsible for the spreading around the country of other kami.

=== Notable shrines ===
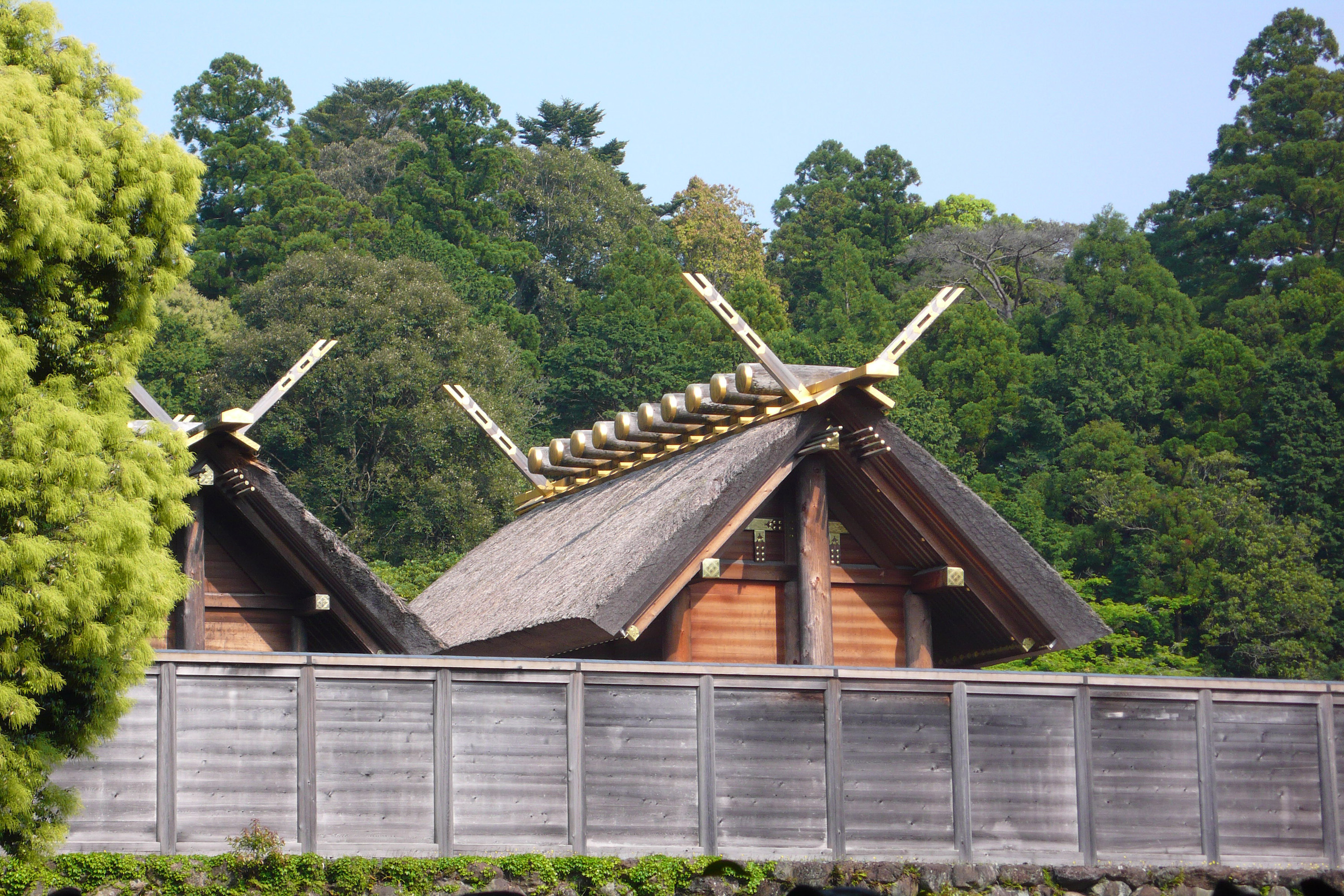
Ise Grand Shrine has been the most important shrine in Japan.

The Ise Grand Shrine in Mie prefecture is, with Izumo-taisha, the most representative and historically significant shrine in Japan. The kami the two enshrine play fundamental roles in the Kojiki and Nihon Shoki, two texts of great importance to Shinto. Because its kami, Amaterasu, is an ancestor of the Emperor, Ise Grand Shrine is the Imperial Household's family shrine. Ise Grand Shrine is dedicated specifically to the emperor. In the past, even his mother, wife and grandmother needed his permission to worship there. Its traditional and mythological foundation date goes back to 4 BCE, but historians believe it was founded around the 3rd to 5th century CE.

Izumo Taisha in Shimane Prefecture is so old that no document about its origin survives, and the year of foundation is unknown. The shrine is the center of a series of sagas and myths. The kami it enshrines, Ōkuninushi, created Japan before it was populated by Amaterasu's offspring, the Emperor's ancestors. Because of its physical remoteness, in historical times Izumo has been eclipsed in fame by other sites, but there is still a widespread belief that in October all Japanese gods meet there. For this reason, October is also known as the "Month Without Gods" (神無月, Kannazuki; one of its names in the old lunar calendar), while at Izumo Taisha alone it is referred to as the Month With Gods (神在月・神有月, Kamiarizuki).

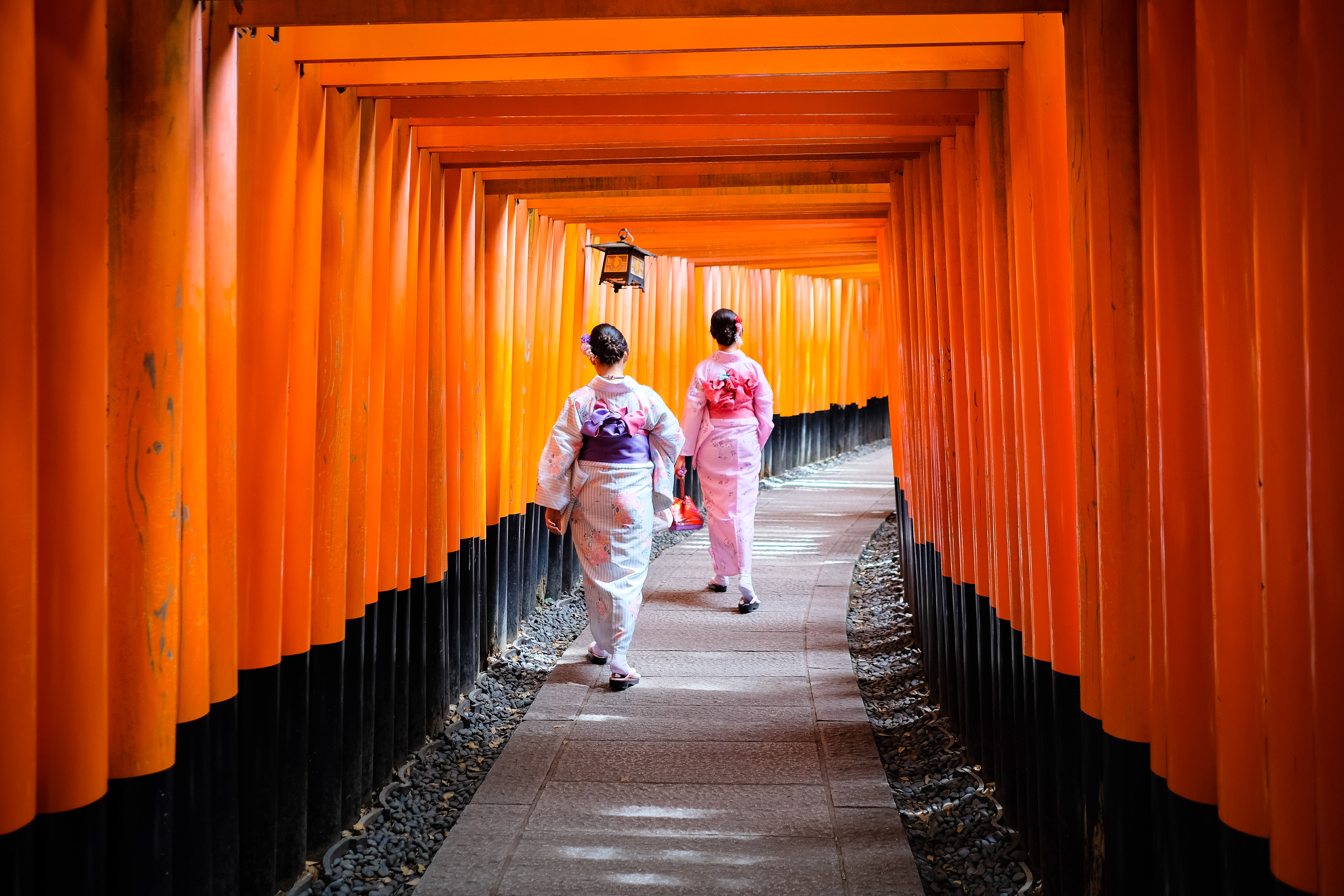
Senbon torii leading to the Fushimi Inari-taisha

Fushimi Inari Taisha is the head shrine of the largest shrine network in Japan, which has more than 32,000 members, about a third of the total. Inari Okami worship started here in the 8th century and has continued ever since, expanding to the rest of the country. Located in Fushimi-ku, Kyoto, the shrine sits at the base of a mountain also named Inari and includes trails up the mountain to many smaller shrines. Another very large example is the Yūtoku Inari Shrine in Kashima City, Saga Prefecture.

Ōita Prefecture's Usa Shrine, called in Japanese Usa Jingū or Usa Hachiman-gū, is together with Iwashimizu Hachiman-gū, the head of the Hachiman shrine network. Hachiman worship started here at least as far back as the Nara period (710–794). In 860, the kami was divided and brought to Iwashimizu Hachiman-gū in Kyoto, which became the focus of Hachiman worship in the capital. Located on top of Mount Otokoyama, Usa Hachiman-gū is dedicated to Emperor Ōjin, his mother Empress Jingū, and female kami Hime no Okami.

Itsukushima Shrine is, together with Munakata Taisha, at the head of the Munakata shrine network. Remembered for its torii raising from the waters, it is a UNESCO World Heritage Site. The shrine is dedicated to the three daughters of Susano-o no Mikoto, kami of seas and storms and brother of the great sun kami.

Kasuga Taisha is a Shinto shrine in the city of Nara, in Nara Prefecture, Japan. Established in 768 AD and rebuilt several times over the centuries, it is the shrine of the Fujiwara family. The interior is noted for its many bronze lanterns, as well as the many stone lanterns that lead up the shrine. The architectural style Kasuga-zukuri takes its name from Kasuga Taisha's honden.

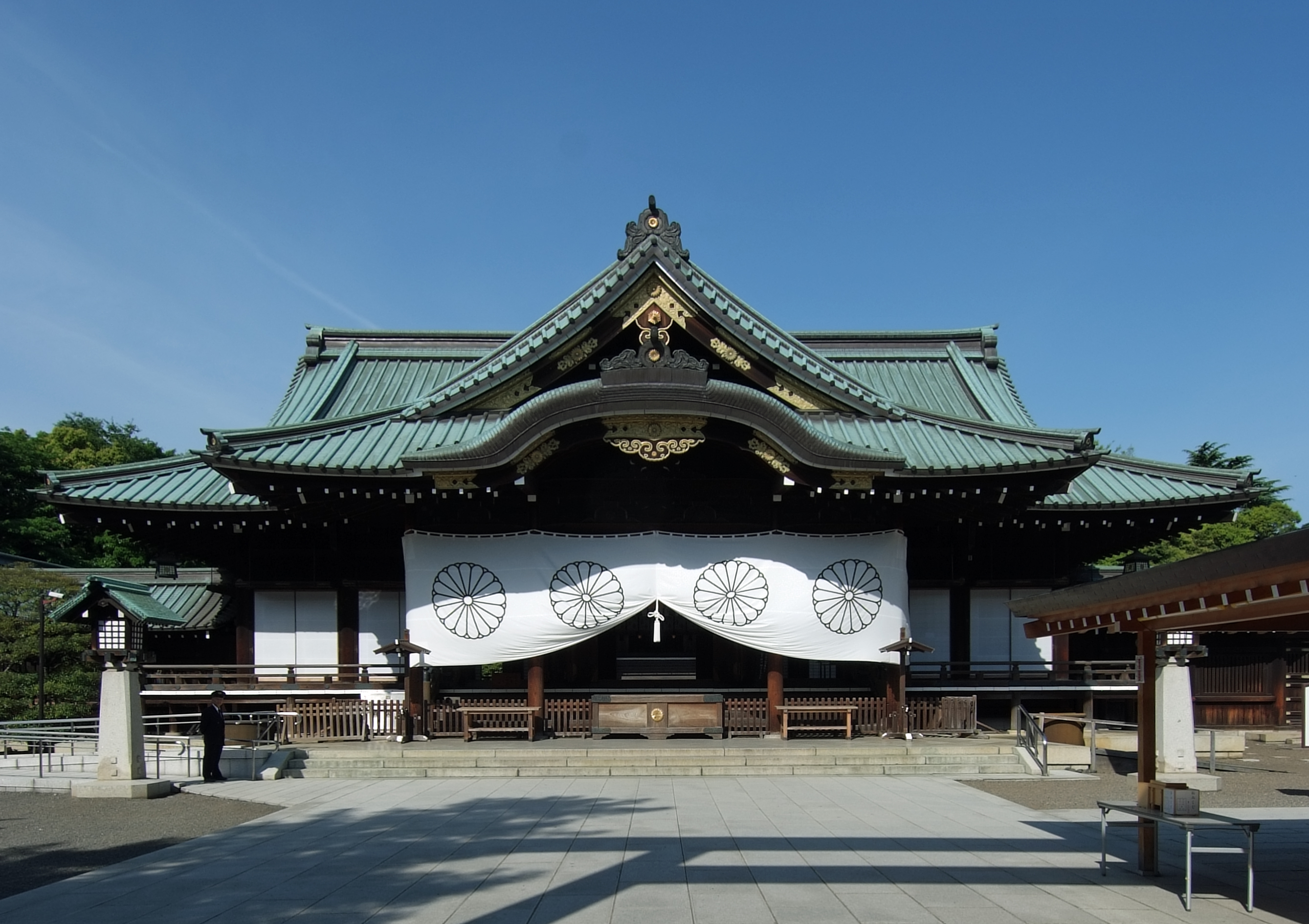
The Yasukuni Shrine in Chiyoda, Tokyo

The Kumano Sanzan shrine complex, head of the Kumano shrine network, includes Kumano Hayatama Taisha (Wakayama Prefecture, Shingu), Kumano Hongu Taisha (Wakayama Prefecture, Tanabe), and Kumano Nachi Taisha (Wakayama Prefecture, Nachikatsuura). The shrines lie between 20 and 40 kilometres (12 and 25 mi) one from the other. They are connected by the pilgrimage route known as Kumano Sankeimichi (熊野参詣道). The great Kumano Sanzan complex also includes two Buddhist temples, Seiganto-ji and Fudarakusan-ji. (Note: The presence of Buddhist temples within a Shinto shrine complex is due to an integration of Buddhism and Shinto (Shinbutsu shūgō) which used to be normal before the Meiji restoration and is still common. The kami which inhabits the Nachi Falls within the Kumano Sanzan shrine complex, the already mentioned Hiryū Gongen, is itself syncretic.)

The religious significance of the Kumano region goes back to prehistoric times and predates all modern religions in Japan. The area was, and still is, considered a place of physical healing.

Yasukuni shrine, in Tokyo, is dedicated to the soldiers and others who died fighting on behalf of the Emperor of Japan.

San Marino Shrine in Serravalle, San Marino, is the first official Shinto shrine in Europe supported by the Jinja Honcho.

=== Shrine networks ===
There are an estimated 80,000 shrines in Japan. The majority of Shinto shrines are associated with a shrine network. This number includes only shrines with resident priests. If smaller shrines, such as roadside or household shrines are included, the number would be twice the amount. These are highly concentrated. Over one-third, 30,000, are associated with Inari. The top six networks comprise over 90% of all shrines. There are at least 20 networks with over 200 shrines.

The twenty largest shrine networks in Japan		Branch shrines	Head shrine
Inari shrines		32,000	Fushimi Inari Taisha (Kyoto)
Hachiman shrines		25,000	Usa Hachiman-gū (Ōita Prefecture, Kyushu), Iwashimizu Hachiman-gū (Kyoto)
Shinmei shrines		18,000	Ise Jingū (Mie prefecture)
Tenjin shrines		10,500	Kitano Tenman-gū (Kyoto), Dazaifu Tenman-gū (Fukuoka prefecture, Kyushu)
Munakata shrines		8,500	Munakata Taisha (Fukuoka Prefecture, Kyushu), Itsukushima Shrine (Hiroshima)
Suwa shrines		5,000	Suwa Taisha (Nagano prefecture)
Hiyoshi shrines		4,000	Hiyoshi Taisha (Shiga prefecture)
Kumano shrines		3,000	Kumano Nachi Taisha (Wakayama prefecture)
Gion shrines (Note: Alongside Hiromine shrine the three share a tradition of the Gion cult. If grouped together they would be the 6th largest shrine network)	Tsushima shrines	3,000	Tsushima Shrine (Aichi prefecture)
Gion shrines	Yasaka shrines	3,000	Yasaka Shrine (Kyoto)
Shirayamahime shrines		2717	Shirayamahime jinja
Atsuta Shrines		2000	Atsuta jingū
Matsunoo Shrines		1114	Matsunoo taisha
Kashima Shrines		918	Kashima jinja
Akiha Shrines		800	Akihasan Hongū Akiha Shrine
Kotohira Shrines		683	Kotohira-gū
Katori Shrines		477	Katori jingū
Hikawa Shrines		287	Hikawa jinja
Kibune Shrines		260	Kibune jinja
Taga shrines		229	Taga taisha

The next ten largest networks contain between 2,000 branches down to about 200 branches, and include the networks headed by Matsunoo-taisha, Kibune Shrine, and Taga-taisha, among others.

==== Inari shrines ====
The number of branch shrines gives an approximate indication of their religious significance, and neither Ise Grand Shrine nor Izumo-taisha can claim the first place. By far the most numerous are shrines dedicated to Inari, tutelary kami of agriculture popular all over Japan, which alone constitute almost a third of the total. Inari protects fishing, commerce, and productivity in general. Many modern Japanese corporations have shrines dedicated to Inari on their premises. Inari shrines are usually very small and easy to maintain, but can be very large, as in the case of Fushimi Inari Taisha, the head shrine of the network. The kami is enshrined in some Buddhist temples.

The entrance to an Inari shrine is usually marked by one or more vermilion torii and two white foxes. This red color has come to be identified with Inari because of the prevalence of its use among Inari shrines and their torii. The kitsune statues are at times mistakenly believed to be a form assumed by Inari, and they typically come in pairs, representing a male and a female, although sex is usually not obvious. These fox statues hold a symbolic item in their mouths or beneath a front paw—most often a jewel and a key, but a sheaf of rice, a scroll, or a fox cub are common. Almost all Inari shrines, no matter how small, will feature at least a pair of these statues, usually flanking, on the altar, or in front of the main sanctuary.

==== Hachiman shrines ====
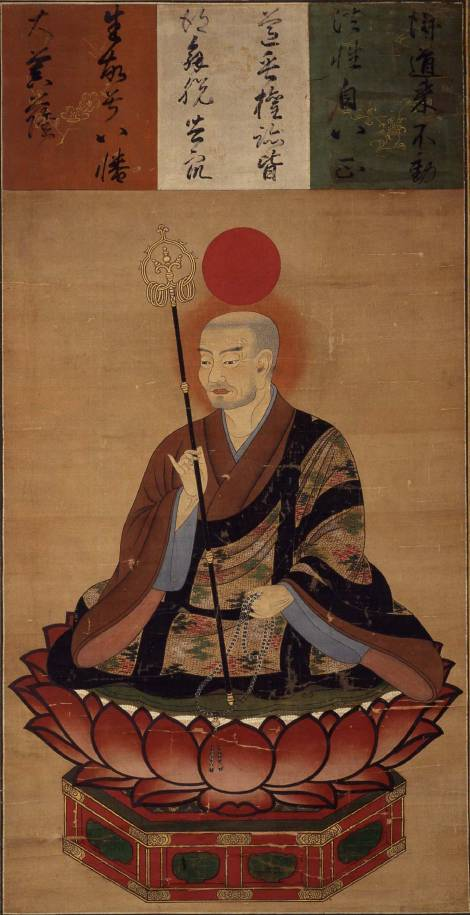
Hachiman in Buddhist robes due to shinbutsu-shūgō

A syncretic entity worshiped as both a kami and a Buddhist daibosatsu, Hachiman is intimately associated with both learning and warriors. In the sixth or seventh century, Emperor Ōjin and his mother Empress Jingū came to be identified together with Hachiman. First enshrined at Usa Hachiman-gū in Ōita Prefecture, Hachiman was deeply revered during the Heian period. According to the Kojiki, it was Ōjin who invited Korean and Chinese scholars to Japan, and for this reason he is the patron of writing and learning.

Because as Emperor Ōjin he was an ancestor of the Minamoto clan, Hachiman became the ujigami (tutelary kami) of the Minamoto samurai clan of Kawachi (Osaka). After Minamoto no Yoritomo became shōgun and established the Kamakura shogunate, Hachiman's popularity grew, and he became by extension the protector of the warrior class the shōgun had brought to power. For this reason, the shintai of a Hachiman shrine is usually a stirrup or a bow.

During the Japanese medieval period, Hachiman worship spread throughout Japan among samurai and the peasantry. There are 25,000 shrines in Japan dedicated to him, the second most numerous after those of the Inari network. Usa Hachiman-gū is the network's head shrine together with Iwashimizu Hachiman-gū. However, Hakozaki Shrine and Tsurugaoka Hachiman-gū are historically no less significant shrines and are more popular.

==== Shinmei shrines ====
While the Ritsuryō legal system was in use, visits by commoners to Ise were forbidden. With its weakening during the Heian period, commoners started being allowed in the shrine. The growth of the Shinmei shrine network was due to two concomitant causes. During the late Heian period, goddess Amaterasu, worshiped initially only at Ise Grand Shrine, started to be re-enshrined in branch shrines in Ise's own possessions through the typical kanjō mechanism. The first evidence of a Shinmei shrine elsewhere is given by the Azuma Kagami, a Kamakura period text which refers to Amanawa Shinmei-gū's appearance in Kamakura. Amaterasu spread to other parts of the country because of the so-called tobi shinmei (飛び神明; lit. 'flying Shinmei') phenomenon, the belief that Amaterasu flew to other locations and settled there.

==== Tenjin shrines ====
The Tenjin shrine network enshrines 9th-century scholar Sugawara no Michizane. Sugawara had originally been enshrined to placate his spirit, not to be worshiped. Michizane had been unjustly exiled in his life, and it was necessary to somehow placate his rage, believed to be the cause of a plague and other disasters. Kitano Tenman-gū was the first of the shrines dedicated to him. Because in life he was a scholar, he became the kami of learning, and during the Edo period schools often opened a branch shrine for him. Another important shrine dedicated to him is Dazaifu Tenman-gū.

==== Munakata shrines ====
Headed by Kyūshū's Munakata Taisha and Itsukushima Shrine, shrines in this network enshrine the Three Female Kami of Munakata (宗像三女神, Munakata Sanjoshin), namely Chikishima Hime-no-Kami, Tagitsu Hime-no-Kami, and Tagori Hime-no-Kami. The same three kami are enshrined elsewhere in the network, sometimes under a different name. However, while Munakata Taisha enshrines all three in separate islands belonging to its complex, branch shrines generally do not. Which kami they enshrine depends on the history of the shrine and the myths tied to it.

==== Suwa Shrines ====
Suwa Shrines are branch shrines of Suwa Taisha.

==== Hiyoshi shrines ====
Hiyoshi shrines are branch shrines of Hiyoshi Taisha. They have origins in Sannō Ichijitsu Shintō and worship Oyamakui no Kami.

==== Kumano shrines ====
Kumano shrines enshrine the three Kumano mountains: Hongū, Shingū, and Nachi (the Kumano Gongen (熊野権現)). The point of origin of the Kumano cult is the Kumano Sanzan shrine complex, which includes Kumano Hayatama Taisha (Wakayama Prefecture, Shingu), Kumano Hongu Taisha (Wakayama Prefecture, Tanabe), and Kumano Nachi Taisha (Wakayama Prefecture, Nachikatsuura). There are more than 3,000 Kumano shrines in Japan.

==== Gion Shrines ====
Gion shrines are branch shrines of Tsushima Shrine, Yasaka Shrine or Hiromine Shrine. Historically associated with Gozu Tenno, they became dedicated to Susanoo during the separation of Shinto and Buddhism.

== Structure ==
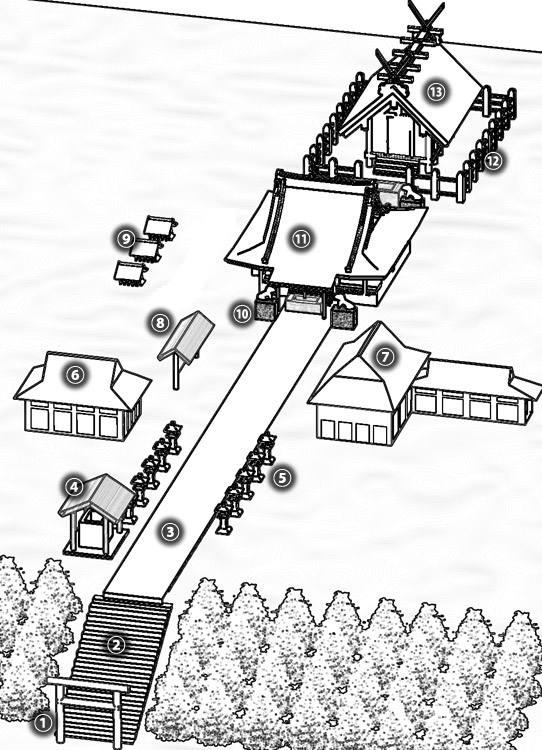
The composition of a Shinto shrine

The following is a list and diagram illustrating the most important parts of a Shinto shrine:

1. Torii – Shinto gate
2. Stone stairs
3. Sandō – the approach to the shrine
4. Chōzuya or temizuya – place of purification to cleanse one's hands and mouth
5. Tōrō – decorative stone lanterns
6. Kagura-den – building dedicated to Noh or the sacred kagura dance
7. Shamusho – the shrine's administrative office
8. Ema – wooden plaques bearing prayers or wishes
9. Sessha and massha – small auxiliary shrines
10. Komainu – the so-called "lion dogs", guardians of the shrine
11. Haiden – oratory or hall of worship
12. Tamagaki – fence surrounding the honden
13. Honden – main hall, enshrining the kami
14. On the roof of the haiden and honden are visible chigi (forked roof finials) and katsuogi (short horizontal logs), both common shrine ornamentations.

The general blueprint of a Shinto shrine is Buddhist in origin. The presence of verandas, stone lanterns, and elaborate gates is an example of this influence. The composition of a Shinto shrine is extremely variable, and none of its many possible features is necessarily present. Even the honden can be missing if the shrine worships a nearby natural shintai.

Since its grounds are sacred, they are usually surrounded by a fence made of stone or wood called tamagaki. Access is made possible by an approach called sandō. The entrances are straddled by gates called torii, which are usually the simplest way to identify a Shinto shrine.

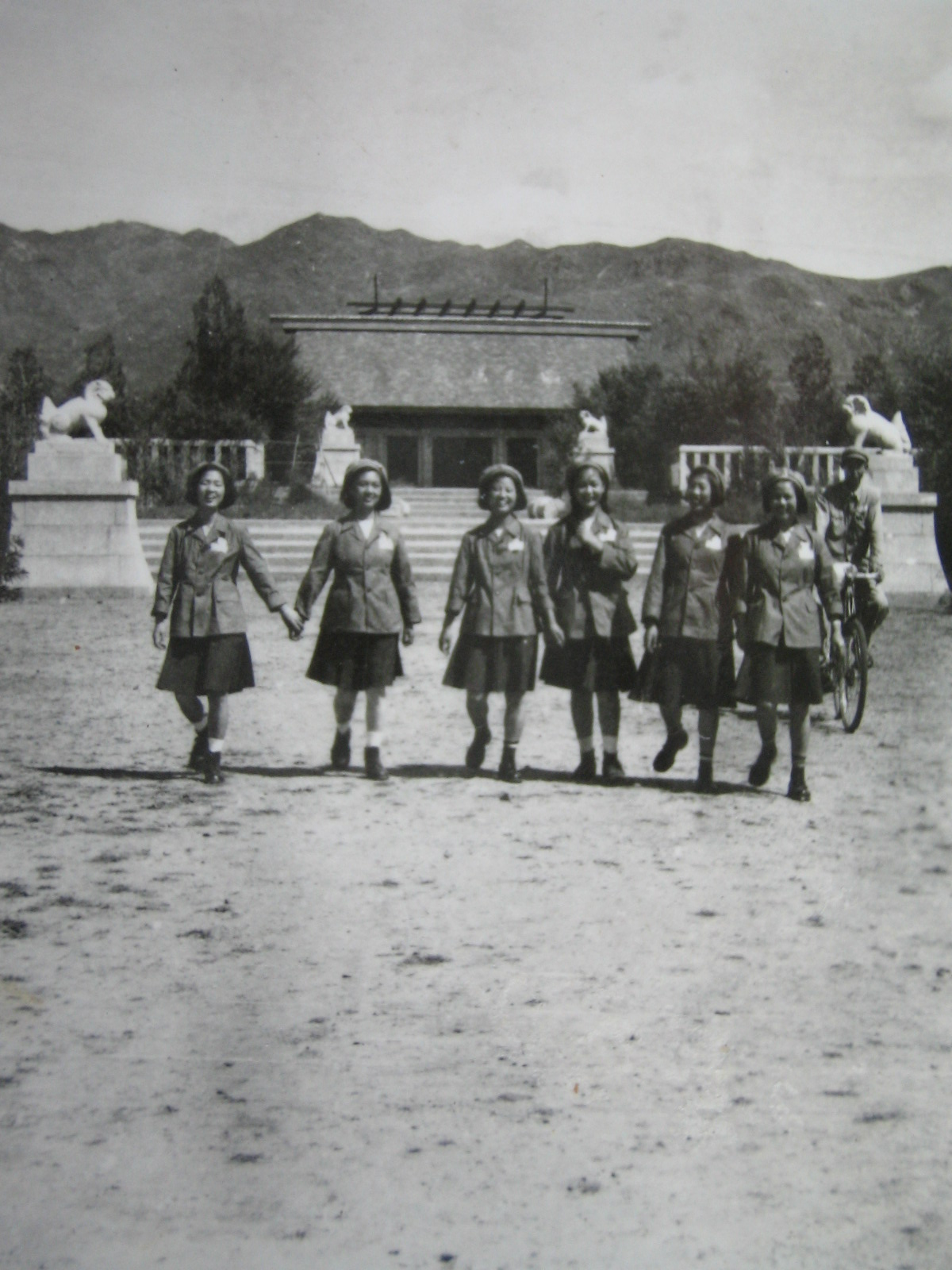
Mengjiang shrine in Zhangjiakou, Hebei, China, 1952

A shrine may include within its grounds several structures, each built for a different purpose. Among them are the honden or sanctuaries, where the kami are enshrined, the heiden or hall of offerings, where offers and prayers are presented, and the haiden or hall of worship, where there may be seats for worshippers. The honden is the building that contains the shintai, literally, 'the sacred body of the kami'. (Note: In spite of its name, the shintaiis actually a temporary repository of the enshrined kami.)

Of these, only the haiden is open to the laity. The honden is usually located behind the haiden and is often much smaller and unadorned. Other notable shrine features are the temizuya, the fountain where visitors cleanse their hands and mouth, and the shamusho (社務所), the office which oversees the shrine. Buildings are often adorned by chigi and katsuogi, variously oriented poles which protrude from their roof.

Before the Meiji Restoration it was common for a Buddhist temple to be built inside or next to a shrine, or vice versa. If a shrine housed a Buddhist temple, it was called a jingūji. Analogously, temples all over Japan adopted guardian kami (chinjugami) and built temple shrines (寺社, jisha) to house them. After the forcible separation of Buddhist temples and Shinto shrines (shinbutsu bunri) ordered by the new government in the Meiji period, the connection between the two religions was officially severed, but continued nonetheless in practice and is still visible today.

== Architectural styles ==
Shrine buildings can have many different basic layouts, usually named either after a famous shrine's honden (e.g. hiyoshi-zukuri, named after Hiyoshi Taisha), or a structural characteristic (e.g., irimoya-zukuri, after the hip-and gable roof it adopts. The suffix -zukuri in this case means 'structure'.)

The honden's roof is always gabled, and some styles have a veranda-like aisle called hisashi (a 1-ken wide corridor surrounding one or more sides of the core of a shrine or temple). Among the factors involved in the classification, important are the presence or absence of:

- hirairi or hirairi-zukuri (平入・平入造) – a style of construction in which the building has its main entrance on the side which runs parallel to the roof's ridge (non gabled-side). The shinmei-zukuri, nagare-zukuri, hachiman-zukuri, and hie-zukuri belong to this type.
- tsumairi or tsumairi-zukuri (妻入・妻入造) – a style of construction in which the building has its main entrance on the side which runs perpendicular to the roof's ridge (gabled side). The taisha-zukuri, sumiyoshi-zukuri, ōtori-zukuri and kasuga-zukuri belong to this type.

Proportions are important. A building of a given style often must have certain proportions measured in ken (the distance between pillars, a quantity variable from one shrine to another or even within the same shrine).

The oldest styles are the tsumairi shinmei-zukuri, taisha-zukuri, and sumiyoshi-zukuri, believed to predate the arrival of Buddhism.

The two most common are the hirairi nagare-zukuri and the tsumairi kasuga-zukuri. Larger, more important shrines tend to have unique styles.

=== Most common styles ===
The following are the two most common shrine styles in Japan.

==== Nagare-zukuri ====
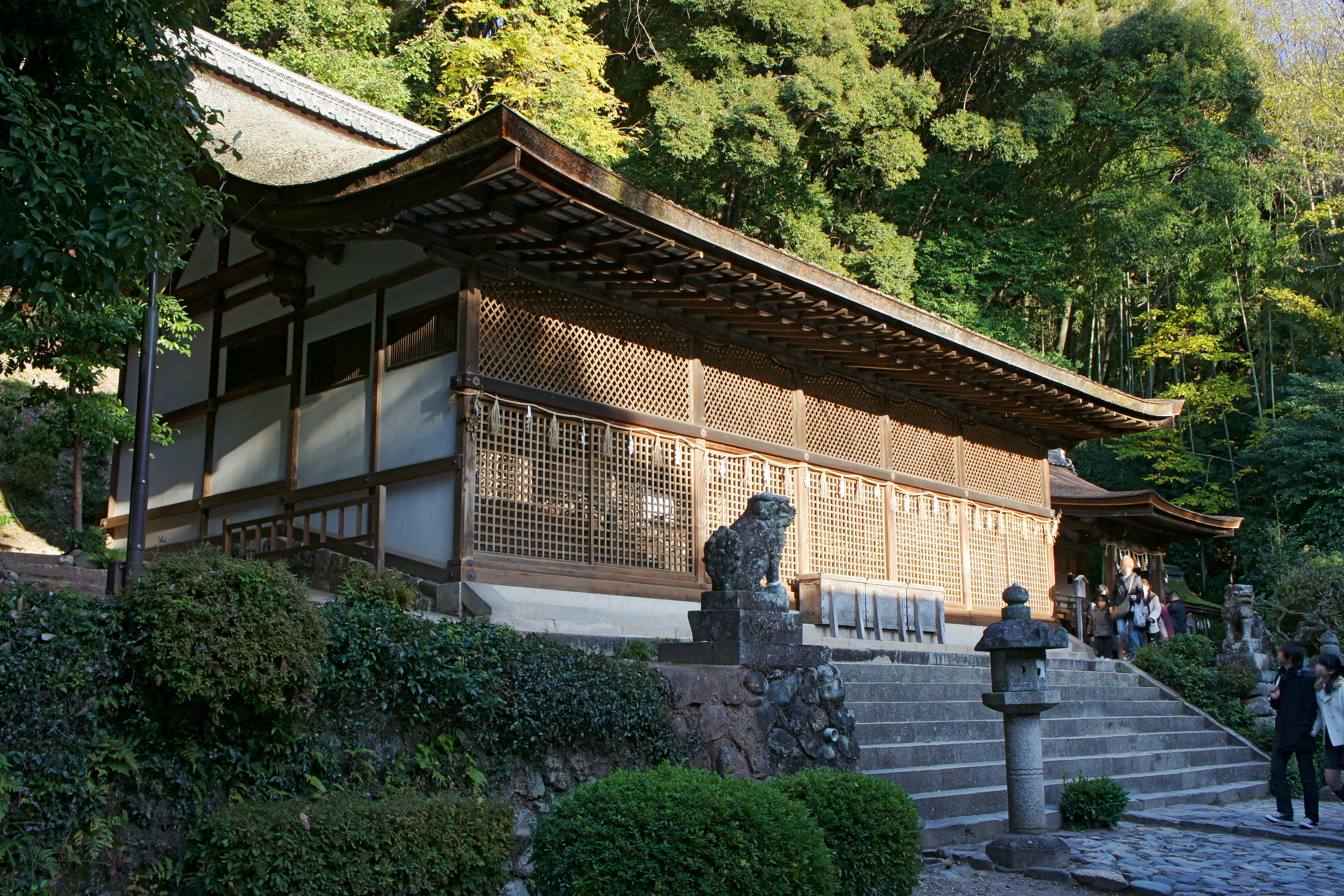
Ujigami Shrine in Uji, Kyoto Prefecture

The nagare-zukuri (flowing style) or nagare hafu-zukuri (流破風造; flowing gabled style) is a style characterized by a very asymmetrical gabled roof or kirizuma-yane (切妻屋根), projecting outwards on the non-gabled side, above the main entrance, to form a portico.

This is the feature which gives the style its name, the most common among shrines all over Japan. Sometimes the basic layout consisting of an elevated core (omoya) partially surrounded by a veranda called hisashi (all under the same roof) is modified by the addition of a room in front of the entrance.

The honden varies in roof ridge length from 1 to 11 ken, but is never 6 or 8 ken. The most common sizes are 1 and 3 ken. The oldest shrine in Japan, Uji's Ujigami Shrine, has a honden of this type. Its external dimensions are 5×3 ken, but internally it is composed of three sanctuaries (内殿, naiden) measuring 1 ken each.

==== Kasuga-zukuri ====
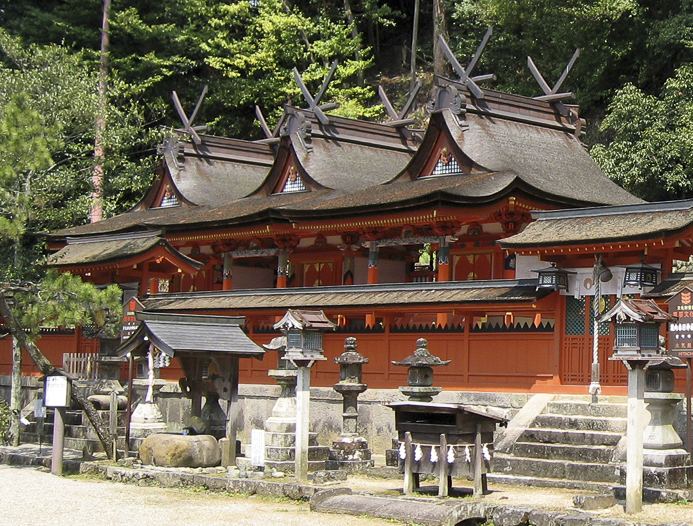
The honden at Uda Mikumari Shrine Kami-gū is made of three joined Kasuga-zukuri buildings.

Kasuga-zukuri as a style takes its name from Kasuga Taisha's honden. It is characterized by the extreme smallness of the building, just 1×1 ken in size. In Kasuga Taisha's case, this translates in 1.9 by 2.6 metres (6.2 ft × 8.5 ft). The roof is gabled with a single entrance at the gabled end, decorated with chigi and katsuogi, covered with cypress bark and curved upwards at the eaves. Supporting structures are painted vermillion, while the plank walls are white.

After the Nagare-zukuri, this is the most common style, with most instances in the Kansai region around Nara.

=== Styles predating the arrival of Buddhism ===
The following four styles predate the arrival in Japan of Buddhism.

==== Primitive shrine layout with no honden ====
Unique in that the honden is missing, it is believed shrines of this type are reminiscent of what shrines were like in prehistorical times. The first shrines had no honden because the shintai, or object of worship, was the mountain on which they stood. An extant example is Nara's Ōmiwa Shrine, which still has no honden. An area near the haiden or hall of worship, sacred and taboo, replaces it for worship. Another prominent example of this style is Futarasan Shrine near Nikkō, whose shintai is Mount Nantai.

==== Shinmei-zukuri ====
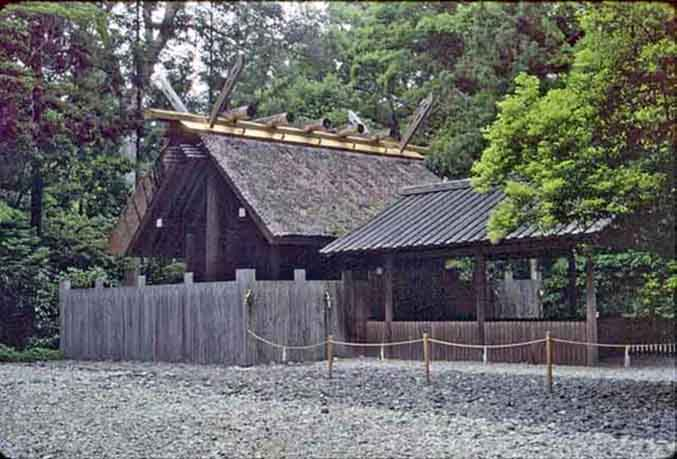
A shrine at Ise

Shinmei-zukuri is an ancient style typical of, and most common at, Ise Grand Shrine, the holiest of Shinto shrines. It is most common in Mie prefecture. Characterized by an extreme simplicity, its basic features can be seen in Japanese architecture from the Kofun period (250–538 CE) onwards and it is considered the pinnacle of Japanese traditional architecture. Built in planed, unfinished wood, the honden is either 3×2 ken or 1×1 ken in size, has a raised floor, a gabled roof with an entry on one of the non-gabled sides, no upward curve at the eaves, and decorative logs called chigi and katsuogi protruding from the roof's ridge. The oldest extant example is Nishina Shinmei Shrine.

==== Sumiyoshi-zukuri ====
Sumiyoshi-zukuri takes its name from Sumiyoshi Taisha's honden in Ōsaka. The building is 4 ken wide and 2 ken deep and has an entrance under the gable. Its interior is divided in two sections, one at the front (外陣, gejin) and one at the back (内陣, naijin) with a single entrance at the front. Construction is simple, but the pillars are painted in vermilion and the walls in white.

The style is supposed to have its origin in old palace architecture. Another example of this style is Sumiyoshi Jinja, part of the Sumiyoshi Sanjin complex in Fukuoka Prefecture. In both cases, as in many others, there is no veranda.

==== Taisha-zukuri ====
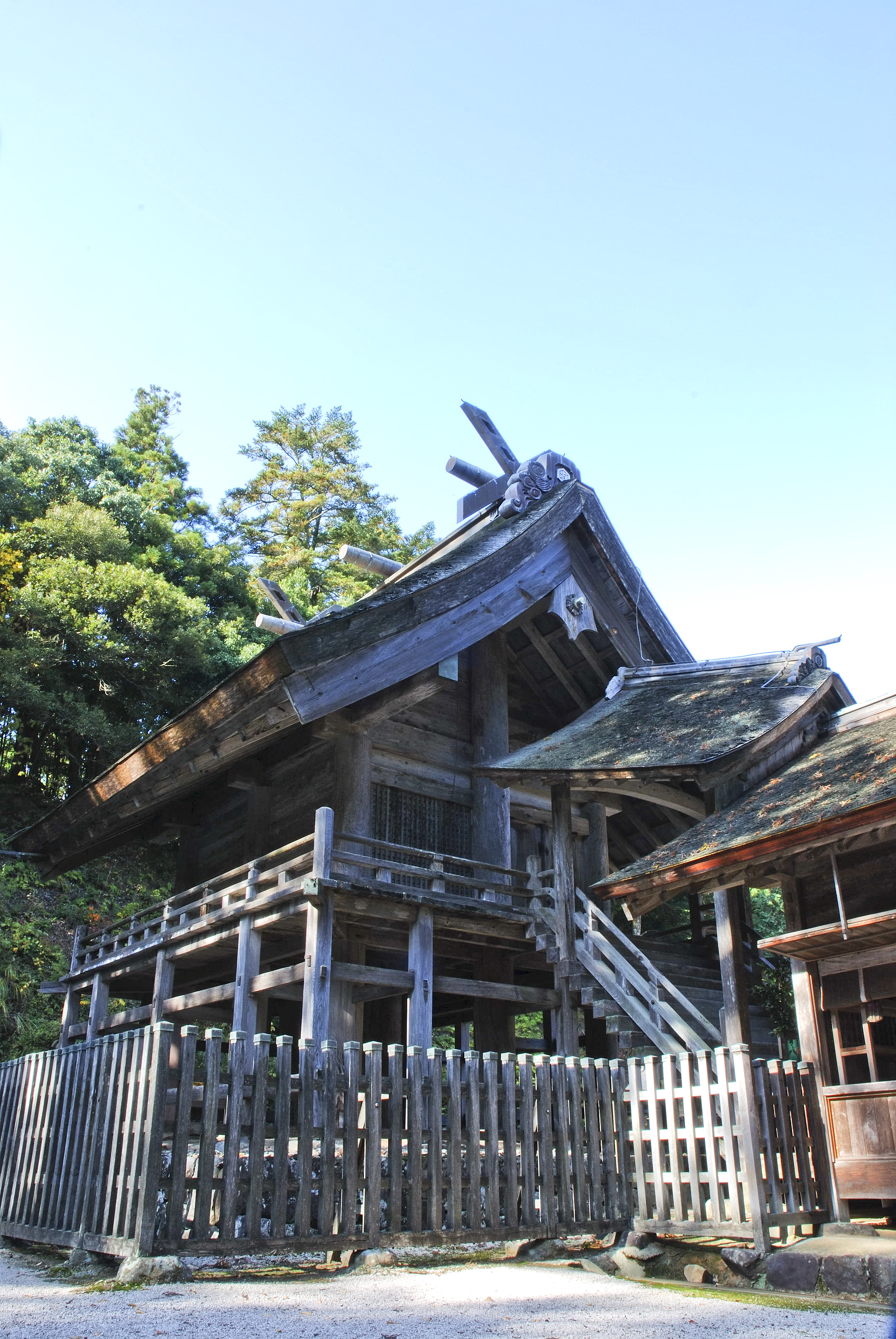
Kamosu Jinja's honden

Taisha-zukuri or Ōyashiro-zukuri (大社造) is the oldest shrine style, takes its name from Izumo Taisha and, like Ise Grand Shrine's, has chigi and katsuogi, plus archaic features like gable-end pillars and a single central pillar (shin no mihashira). Because its floor is raised on stilts, it is believed to have its origin in raised-floor granaries similar to those found in Toro, Shizuoka prefecture.

The honden normally has a 2×2 ken footprint (12.46 by 12.46 metres (40.9 ft × 40.9 ft) in Izumo Taisha's case), with an entrance on the gabled end. The stairs to the honden are covered by a cypress bark roof. The oldest extant example of the style is Kamosu Jinja's honden in Shimane Prefecture, built in the 16th century.

=== Other styles ===
Many other architectural styles exist, most of them rare.

== Interpreting shrine names ==
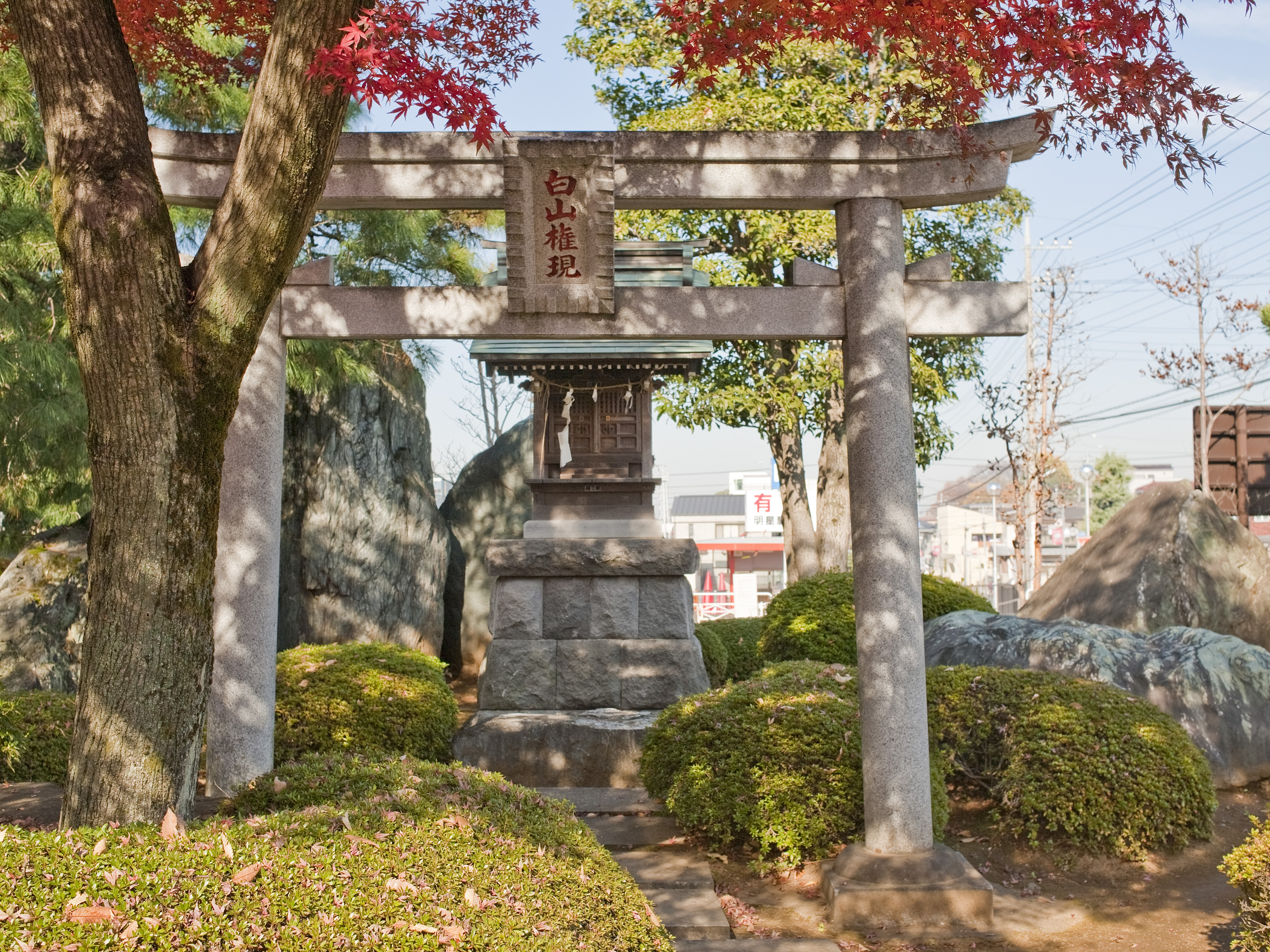
A small shrine called Hakusan Gongen (白山権現), following the pre-Meiji custom

Shrine nomenclature has changed considerably since the Meiji period. Until then, the vast majority of shrines were small and had no permanent priest. With very few exceptions, they were just a part of a temple-shrine complex controlled by Buddhist clergy.

They usually enshrined a local tutelary kami, so they were called with the name of the kami followed by terms like gongen; ubusuna (産土), short for ubusuna no kami, or guardian deity of one's birthplace; or great kami (明神, myōjin). The term jinja (神社), now the most common, was rare. Examples of this kind of pre-Meiji use are Tokusō Daigongen and Kanda Myōjin.

Today, the term "Shinto shrine" in English is used in opposition to "Buddhist temple" to mirror in English the distinction made in Japanese between Shinto and Buddhist religious structures. This single English word translates several non-equivalent Japanese words, including jinja (神社) as in Yasukuni Jinja; yashiro (社) as in Tsubaki Ōkami Yashiro; miya (宮) as in Watarai no Miya; -gū (宮) as in Iwashimizu Hachiman-gū; jingū (神宮) as in Meiji Jingū; taisha (大社) as in Izumo Taisha; mori (杜); and hokora or hokura (神庫).

Shrine names are descriptive. A problem in dealing with them is understanding exactly what they mean. Although there is a lot of variation in their composition, it is usually possible to identify in them two parts. The first is the shrine's name proper, or meishō (名称), the second is the so-called shōgō (称号), or 'title'.

=== Meishō ===
The most common meishō is the location where the shrine stands, as for example in the case of Ise Jingū, the most sacred of shrines, which is located in the city of Ise, Mie prefecture.

Very often the meishō will be the name of the kami enshrined. An Inari Shrine for example is a shrine dedicated to kami Inari. Analogously, a Kumano Shrine is a shrine that enshrines the three Kumano mountains. A Hachiman Shrine enshrines kami Hachiman. Tokyo's Meiji Shrine enshrines the Meiji Emperor. The name can also have other origins, often unknown or unclear.

=== Shōgō ===
The second part of the name defines the status of the shrine.

- Jinja (神社) is the most general word for a Shinto shrine. Any place that has a honden (本殿) is a jinja. The word jinja used to have two more readings, kamu-tsu-yashiro and mori, both of which are kun'yomi readings and mean 'kami grove'. Both of these older readings can be found, for example, in the Man'yōshū.
- Yashiro (社) is a generic term for Shinto shrine, much like jinja.
- Mori (杜; lit. 'grove') are places where kami are present. These places can therefore be shrines and, in fact, 神社, 社 and 杜 can all be read as mori. This reading reflects the fact that the first shrines were simply sacred groves or forests where kami were present.
- The suffix -sha or -ja, as in Shinmei-sha or Tenjin-ja indicates a minor shrine that has received a kami from a more important shrine through the kanjō process.
- Hokora or hokura (神庫) are extremely small shrines like the ones that can be found, for example, along country roads.
- A jingū (神宮) is a shrine of particularly high status that has a deep relationship with the Imperial household or enshrines an Emperor. This is the case for, both, Ise Jingū and Meiji Jingū. Jingū alone, however, only refers to Ise Jingū, whose official name is just that.
- Miya (宮) indicates a shrine that is enshrining a special kami or a member of the Imperial household like the Empress. However, there are many examples, much like with -gū, in which it is used simply as a tradition. During the period of state regulation, many shrines changed the -miya in their names to jinja.
- -gū (宮) indicates a shrine enshrining an imperial prince. However, there are many instances where it is used simply as a tradition.
- A taisha or ōyashiro (大社; lit. 'great shrine') is a shrine that was classified as such under the old system of shrine ranking, the shakaku (社格), which was abolished in 1946. Many shrines carrying that shōgō or 'title' adopted it only after the war.
- During the Japanese Middle Ages, shrines started being called gongen (権現), a term of Buddhist origin. For example, in Eastern Japan, there are still many Hakusan shrines where the shrine itself is called gongen. Because it represents the application of Buddhist terminology to Shinto kami, its use was legally abolished by the Meiji government with the Shinto and Buddhism Separation Order (神仏判然令, Shin-butsu Hanzenrei), and shrines began to be called jinja.

These names are not equivalent in terms of prestige: a taisha is more prestigious than a -gū, which is more important than a jinja.

== Etiquette at shrines ==
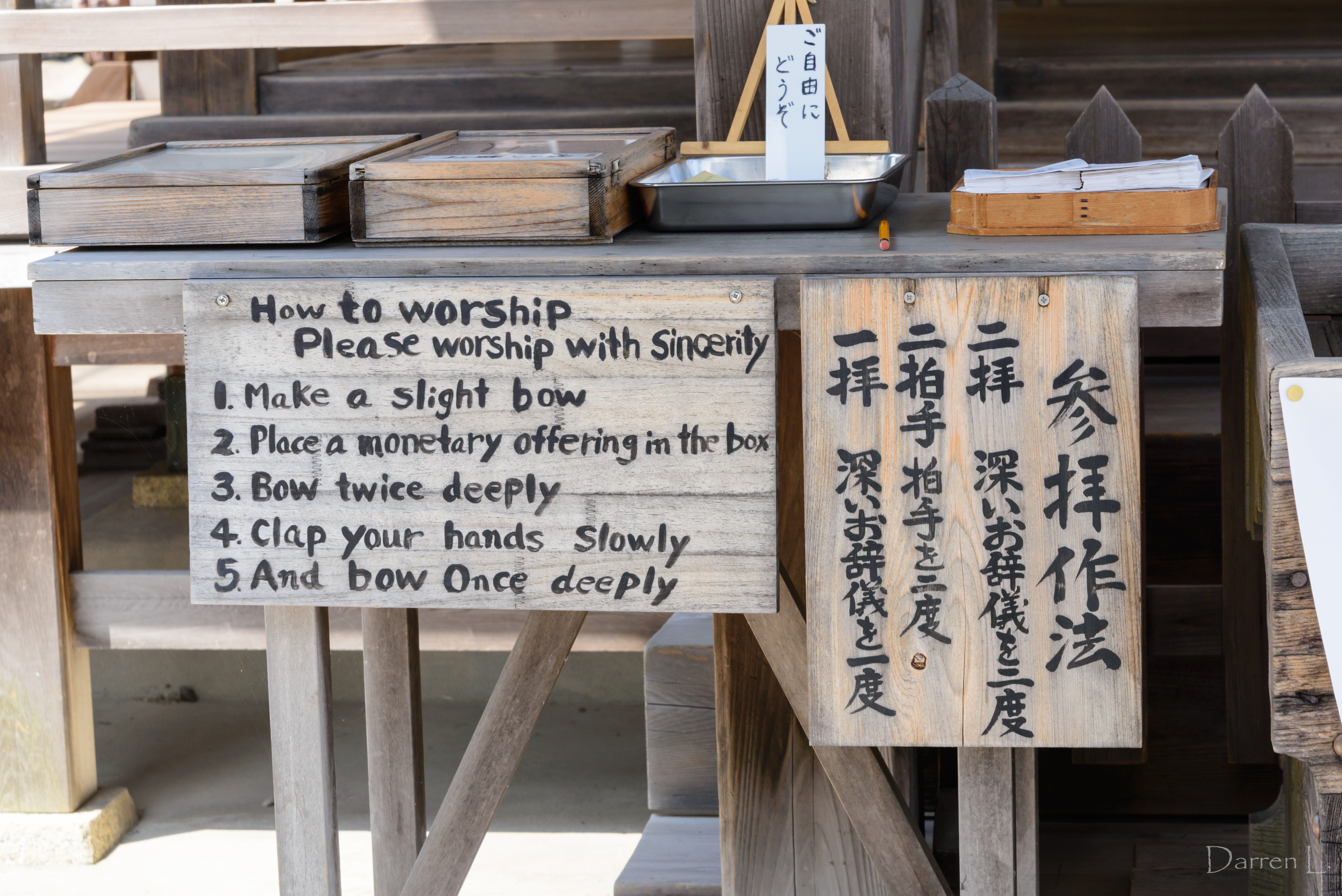
Worshiping manners, 2016, Nagoya, Japan. The etiquette of Two bows, two claps, one bow is explained in both Japanese and English.

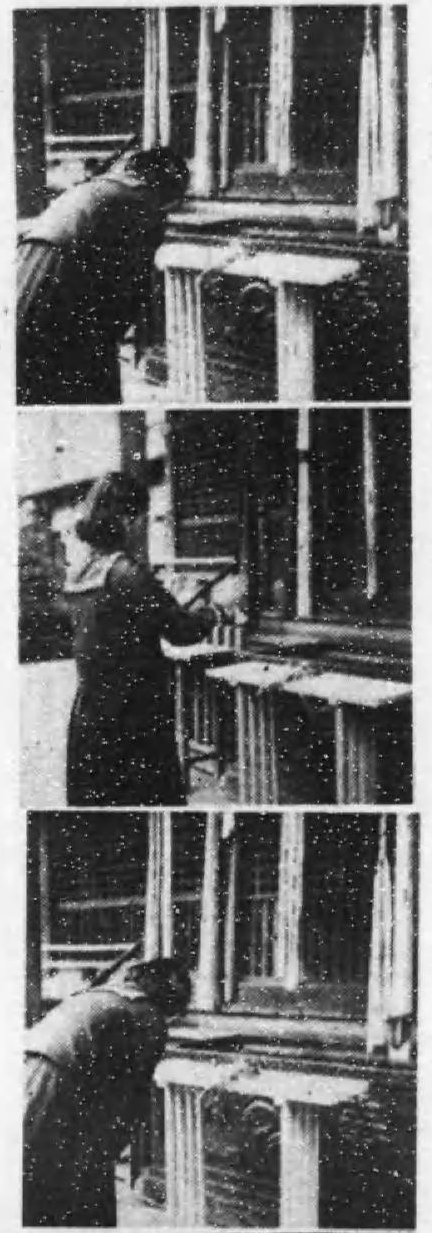
An example of prewar two-beat, one-beat worship. The upper row is the second worship, the middle row is the second clap, and the lower row is the first worship. This is the worship after offering the tamagushi, and the tamagushi can be seen on the table in front. Source: NDLJP:1054789/27.

At shrines there is a relatively standardized system of visit ettiquette that is called Two bows, two claps, one bow. It goes roughly as follows:

1. Bow once before entering the torii. Walking through the center of the torii is reserved for deities.
2. Purify the hands and mouth with the chōzuya.
3. Put money in the offering box.
4. Ring the bell 2 to 3 times if present.
5. Bow twice.
6. Clap twice.
7. Bow once. This bow is deeper than the others, at a 90-degree angle.
8. When exiting the shrine, turn around and bow once at the torii.

There are rare exceptions to this system. For example, at Usa Jingū and Izumo-taisha, it is correct etiquette to clap four times in front of the offering box rather than the usual twice.

== Shrines with structures designated as National Treasures ==
Shrines that are part of a World Heritage Site are marked with a dagger (†).

- Tōhoku region
  - Ōsaki Hachiman Shrine (Sendai, Miyagi)
- Kantō region
  - Nikkō Tōshō-gū† (Nikkō, Tochigi)
  - Rinnō-ji† (Nikkō, Tochigi)
- Chūbu region
  - Nishina Shinmei Shrine (Ōmachi, Nagano)
- Kansai region
  - Onjō-ji (Ōtsu, Shiga)
  - Hiyoshi Taisha (Ōtsu, Shiga)
  - Mikami Shrine (Yasu, Shiga)
  - Ōsasahara Shrine (Yasu, Shiga)
  - Tsukubusuma Shrine (Nagahama, Shiga)
  - Namura Shrine (Ryūō, Shiga)
  - Kamo Shrine† (Kyoto, Kyoto)
  - Daigo-ji† (Kyoto, Kyoto)
  - Toyokuni Shrine (Kyoto, Kyoto)
  - Kitano Tenman-gū (Kyoto, Kyoto)
  - Ujigami Shrine† (Uji, Kyoto)
  - Sumiyoshi Taisha (Osaka, Osaka)
  - Sakurai Shrine (Sakai, Osaka)
  - Kasuga Shrine† (Nara, Nara)
  - Enjō-ji (Nara, Nara)
  - Isonokami Shrine (Tenri, Nara)
  - Udamikumari Shrine (Uda, Nara)
- Chūgoku region
  - Sanbutsu-ji (Misasa, Tottori)
  - Izumo Taisha (Taisha, Shimane)
  - Kamosu Shrine (Matsue, Shimane)
  - Kibitsu Shrine (Okayama, Okayama)
  - Itsukushima Shrine† (Hatsukaichi, Hiroshima)
  - Sumiyoshi Shrine (Shimonoseki, Yamaguchi)
- Shikoku region
  - Kandani Shrine (Sakaide, Kagawa)
- Kyūshū region
  - Usa Shrine (Usa, Ōita)
  - Aoi Aso Shrine (Hitoyoshi, Kumamoto)

== Officiants ==
=== Shinto priests ===
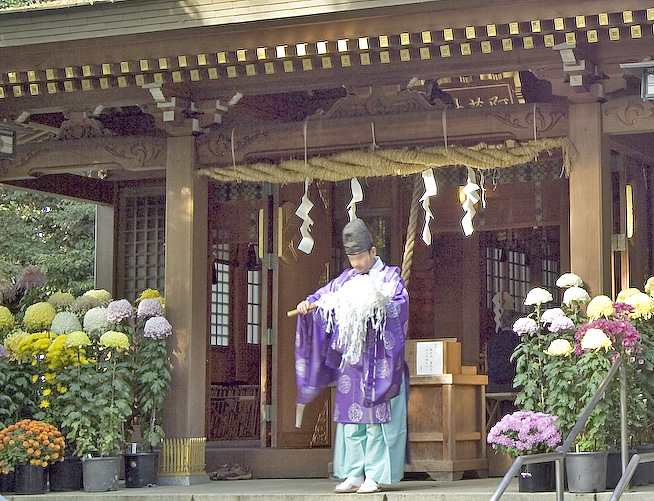
A kannushi

Shinshoku (神職), commonly referred to as kannushi (神主), are Shinto priests responsible for the maintenance of a shrine, as well as for leading worship of a given kami. These two terms were not always synonyms. Originally, a kannushi was a holy man who could work miracles and who, thanks to purification rites, could work as an intermediary between kami and man, but the term later evolved such that it was synonymous with shinshoku, a term for a man who works at a shrine and holds religious ceremonies there. Women can become Shinto priests, and it is common for widows to succeed their husbands.

=== Miko ===
A miko is a shrine maiden who has trained for and taken up several duties at a shrine including assistance of shrine functions such as but not limited to: tidying the premises every day, performing the sacred kagura dances on certain occasions, and performing the sale of sacred goods, including amulets known as omamori, paper talismans known as ofuda, and wood tablets known as ema.

== Gallery ==
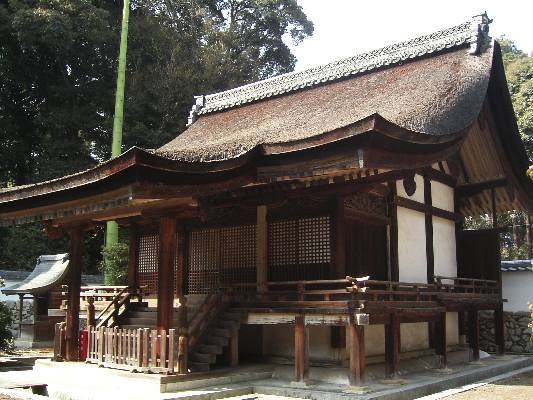
Hirairi style: entrance on the non-gabled side

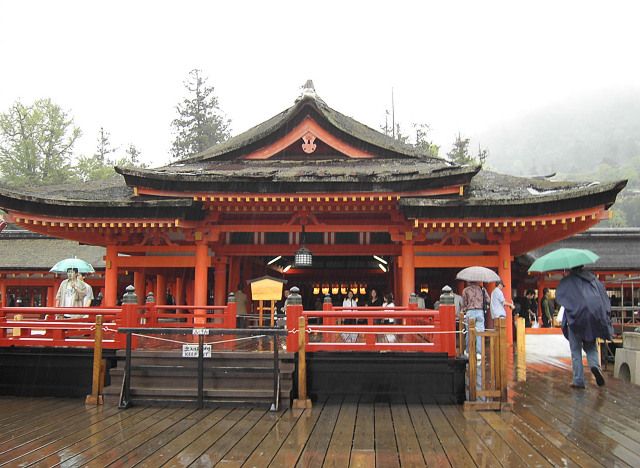
Tsumairi style: entrance on the gabled side

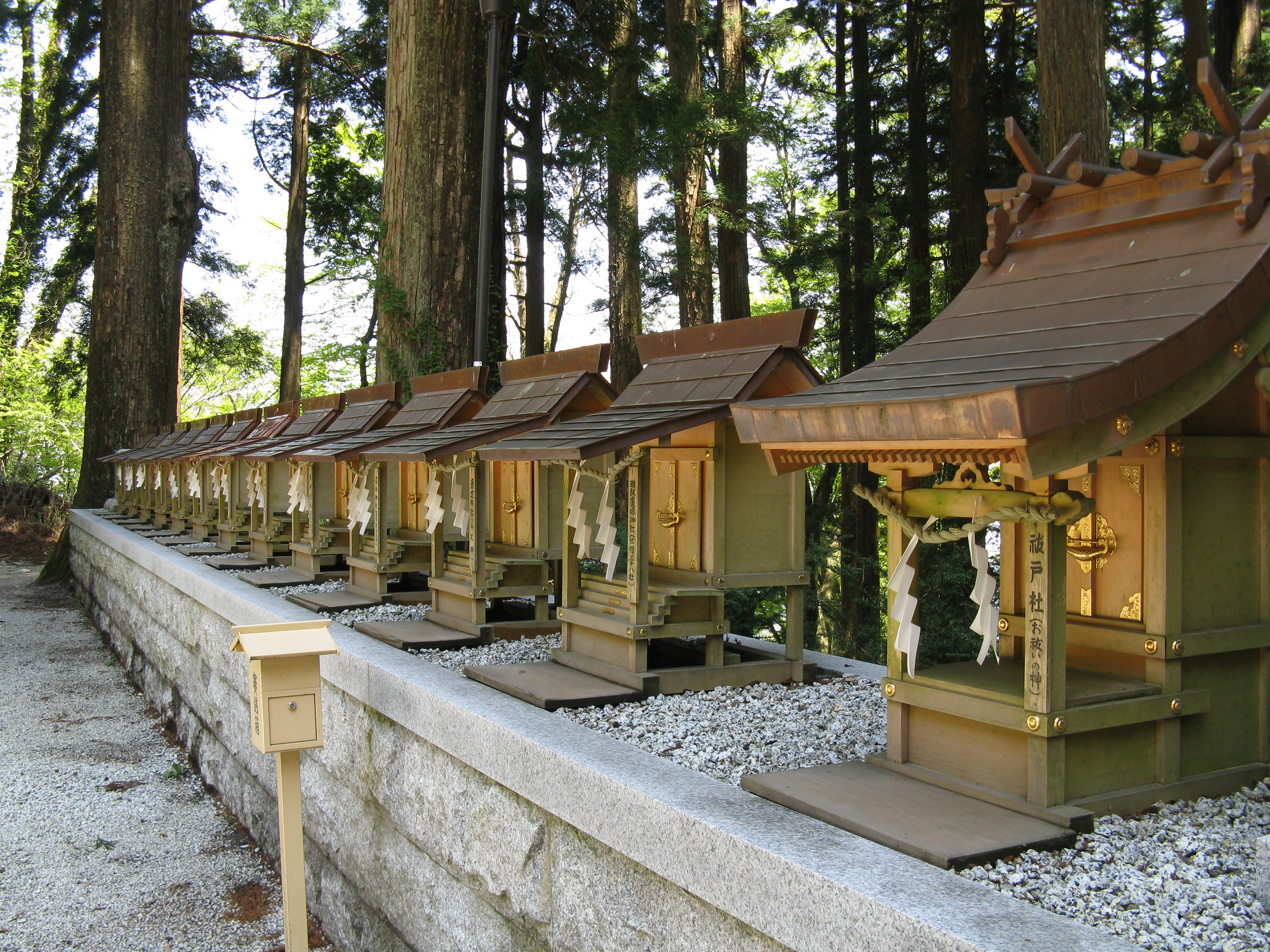
Some setsumassha

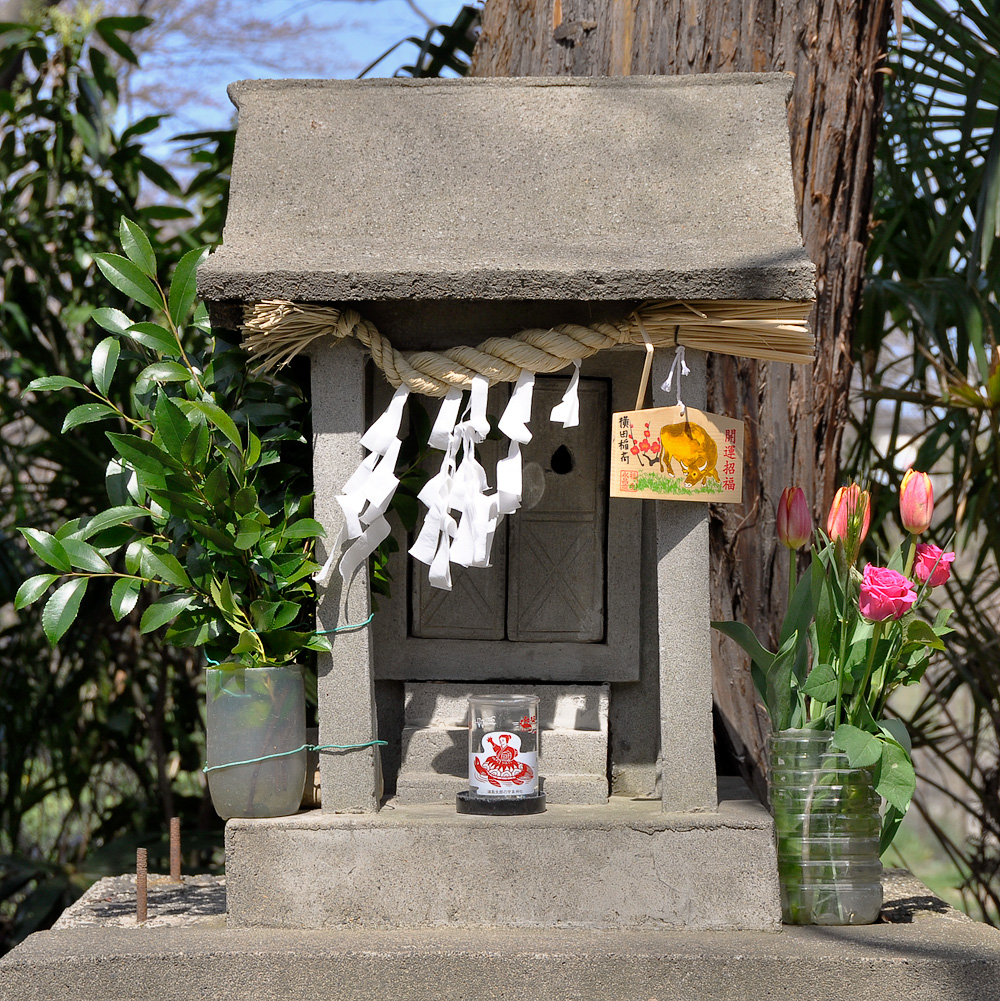
A hokora

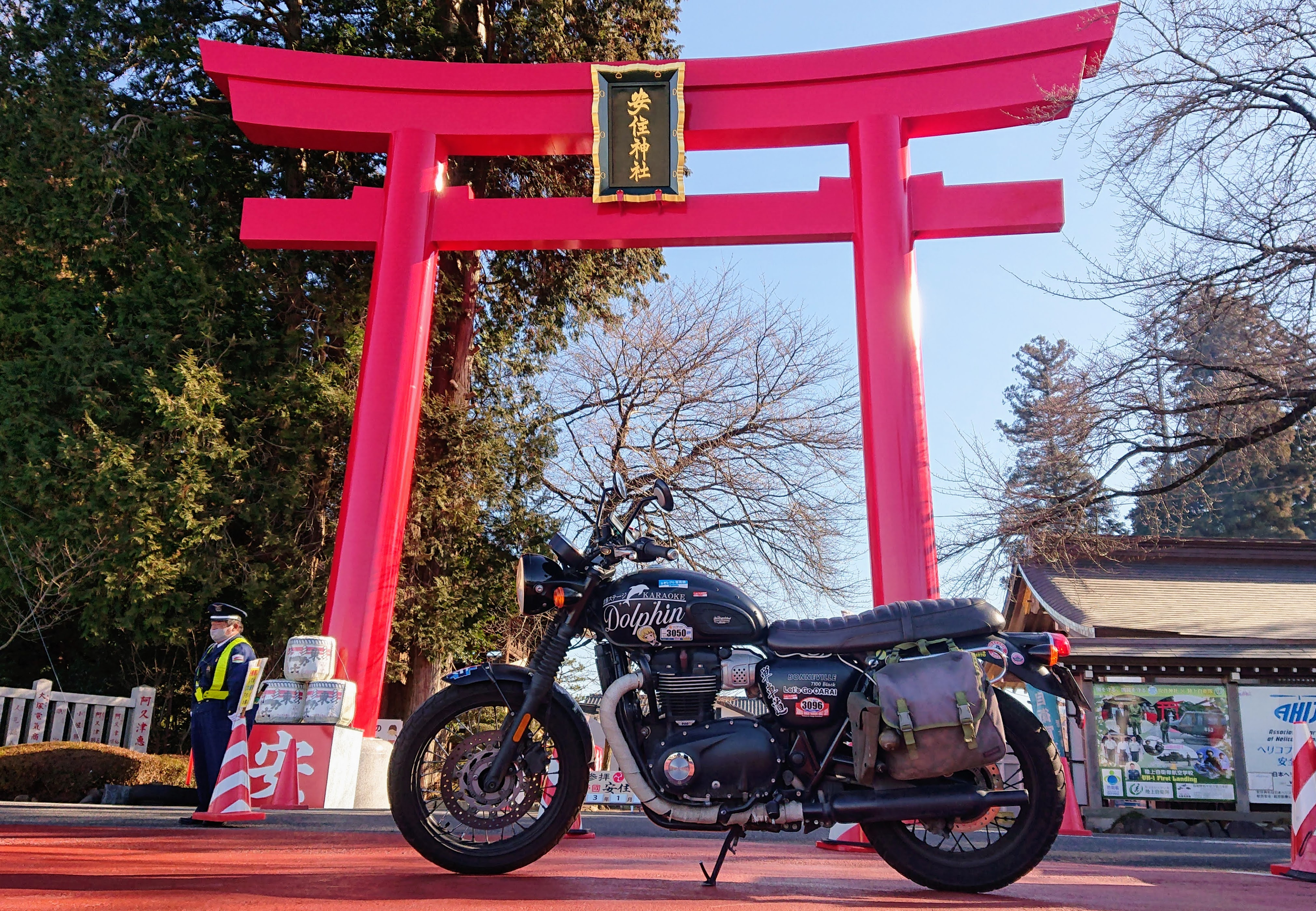
Yasuzumi Jinja is famous not only for praying for safe childbirth, but also as a motorcycle shrine.

== See also ==
- Dambana
- Giboshi
- Glossary of Shinto
- List of National Treasures of Japan (shrines)
- List of Shinto shrines
- Modern system of ranked Shinto shrines
- Senjafuda
- Shrine Shinto
- Twenty-Two Shrines (Nijūnisha)
