= Tobu N100 series =

Japanese train type

Tobu N100 series Spacia X
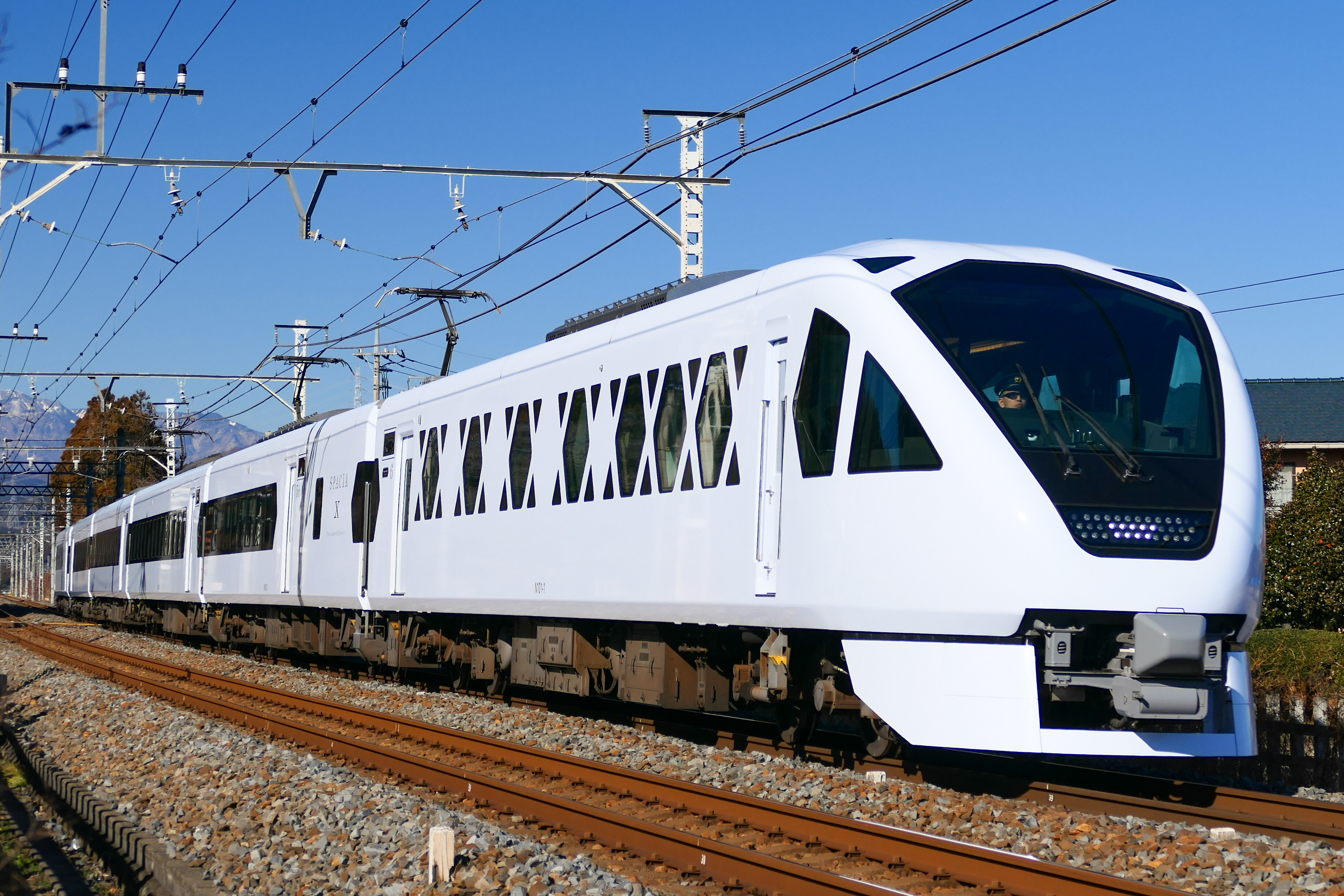
- N100 series train in January 2024
- In service: 15 July 2023 – present
- Manufacturer: Hitachi
- Built at: Kasado Works, Kudamatsu
- Family name: A-train
- Replaced: Tobu 100 series
- Constructed: 2022–2024
- Number built: 24 vehicles (4 sets)
- Formation: 6 cars per trainset
- Operator: Tobu Railway
- Lines served: Nikkō Line; Kinugawa Line; Tobu Skytree Line

Specifications
- Car body construction: Aluminium
- Car length: End cars: 21,580 mm (70 ft 10 in); Intermediate cars: 20,000 mm (65 ft 7 in)
- Width: 2,836 mm (9 ft 4 in)
- Height: 4,045 mm (13 ft 3 in)
- Maximum speed: Service: 120 km/h (75 mph); Design: 130 km/h (81 mph)
- Traction system: Variable frequency (SiC-IGBT hybrid module)
- Traction motors: 165 kW (221 hp) TM-22 three-phase induction motor
- Power output: 2,640 kW (3,540 hp)
- Acceleration: 2.23 km/(h⋅s) (1.39 mph/s)
- Deceleration: Service: 3.7 km/(h⋅s) (2.3 mph/s); Emergency: 5.3 km/(h⋅s) (3.3 mph/s)
- Electric systems: 1,500 V DC (overhead wire)
- Current collection: Single-arm pantograph
- Bogies: TRS-22M (motored); TRS-22T (trailer)
- Headlight type: LED
- Track gauge: 1,067 mm (3 ft 6 in)

Notes/references
- This train won the 67th Blue Ribbon Award in 2024. Sources

The Tobu N100 series (Japanese: 東武N100系, romanized: Tōbu N100-kei), branded Spacia X (スペーシアX), is an electric multiple unit (EMU) train type operated by the private railway operator Tobu Railway on limited express services in Japan since 15 July 2023. A total of four 6-car sets were built by Hitachi to replace the ageing 100 series EMUs which have been in service since 1990.

== History ==
Details of the N100 series were first announced on 11 November 2021. The N100 series is intended to succeed the 100 series Spacia as Tobu's flagship limited express fleet. Production of the fleet began in fiscal 2022, with the first two sets, N101 and N102, being delivered from Hitachi's Kasado plant from 5 March 2023. The last two sets were delivered from the Hitachi plant from February 2024.

The N100 series fleet entered service from 15 July 2023.

== Design ==
The N100 series is part of Hitachi's A-train family, and uses aluminium body construction. It is a recipient of the 2023 Good Design Award, the 2024 Blue Ribbon Award, and the 2025 Red Dot Award: Product Design.

=== Exterior ===
The N100 series sets are painted in a shade of white that takes influence from the color of the Yomeimon gate at the Nikko Tosho-gu shrine. The end cars are fitted with hexagonal side windows, whose frames are inspired by the Japanese "kumiko" woodworking technique.

The train ends each feature an LED panel with 39 LEDs, functioning as a headlight and taillight cluster; when switched on, the headlights form a "T" shape. External LCD destination displays are located at the sides of each car.

=== Interior ===
The interior consists of the following accommodations:

- Cockpit Lounge (car 1): The Cockpit Lounge consists of sofas and lounge chairs. Two lounge chairs face the driver's cab, allowing passengers a front view. A bar, which serves beer, coffee, and snacks, is located at the rear of the Cockpit Lounge. Car 1's vestibule features an artificial skylight.
- Premium seating (car 2): Seats are arranged in a 2+1 abreast configuration with a seat pitch of 120 centimetres (47 in). The seats use orange fabric, which was chosen to make the seats stand out from the dark grey flooring. They also incorporate a back shell structure, which Tobu Railway states allows for reclining without impacting rearward passengers.
- Standard class (cars 3–5): Seats are arranged in a 2+2 abreast configuration with a 110-centimetre (43 in) seat pitch, the same as that of the outgoing 100 series. Cars 3 and 4 consist of standard class accommodation throughout (56 seats each), and car 5 has 18 standard class seats, wheelchair spaces, and two 2-person semi-compartmentalized seating bays.
- Cockpit Suite (car 6): Situated behind the driver's cab, the Cockpit Suite is an 11-square-metre (120 sq ft) space which seats up to seven passengers (four seats and a three-person sofa). The suite and the driver's cab are separated by a glass barrier, also allowing passengers a view from the front. Also featured in car 6 are four 4-person compartments, with sofas that form a "U" shape. The compartments are situated directly behind the Cockpit Suite. Like car 1, car 6's vestibule features an artificial skylight.
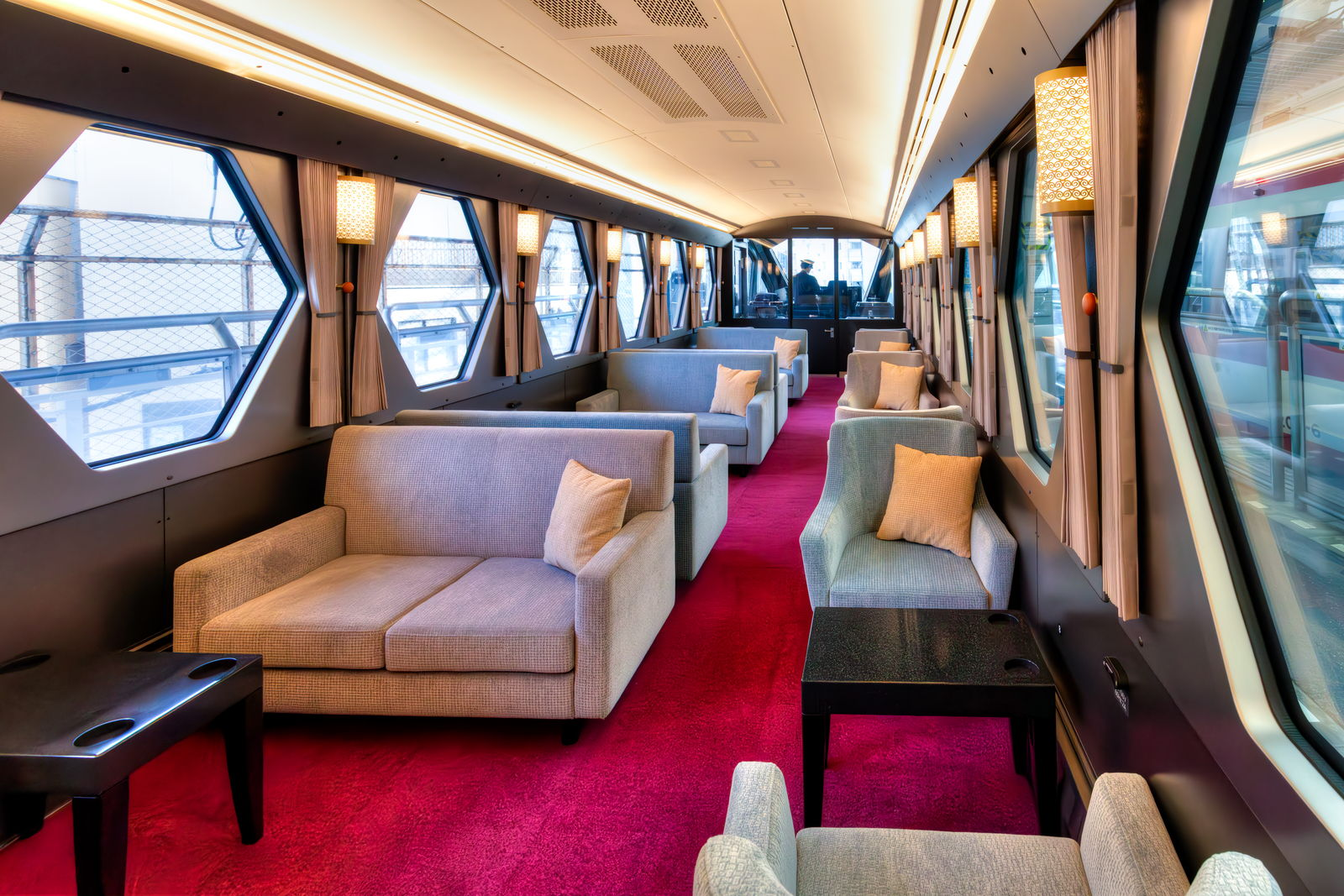
Cockpit Lounge (car 1)

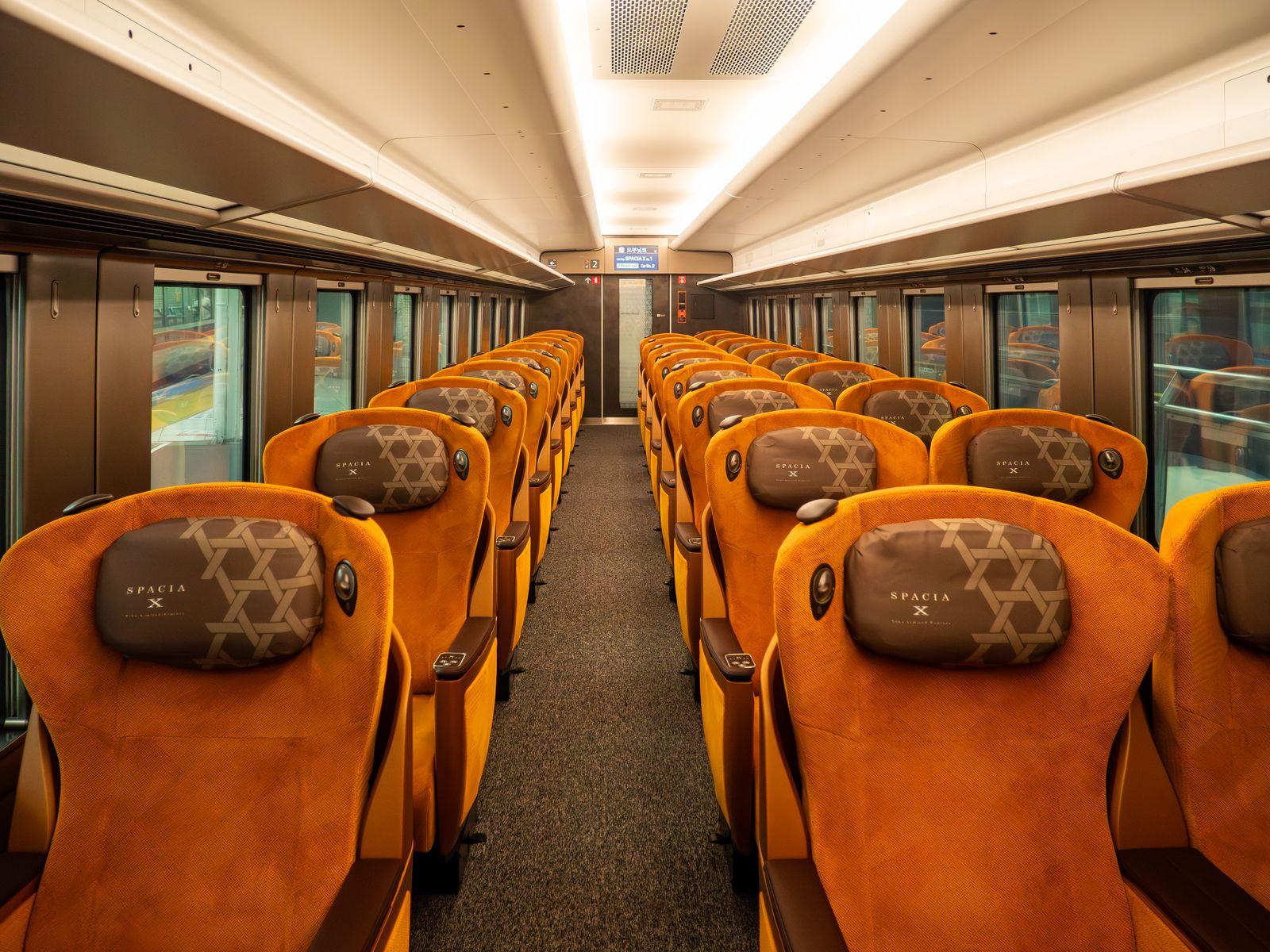
Premium seating (car 2)

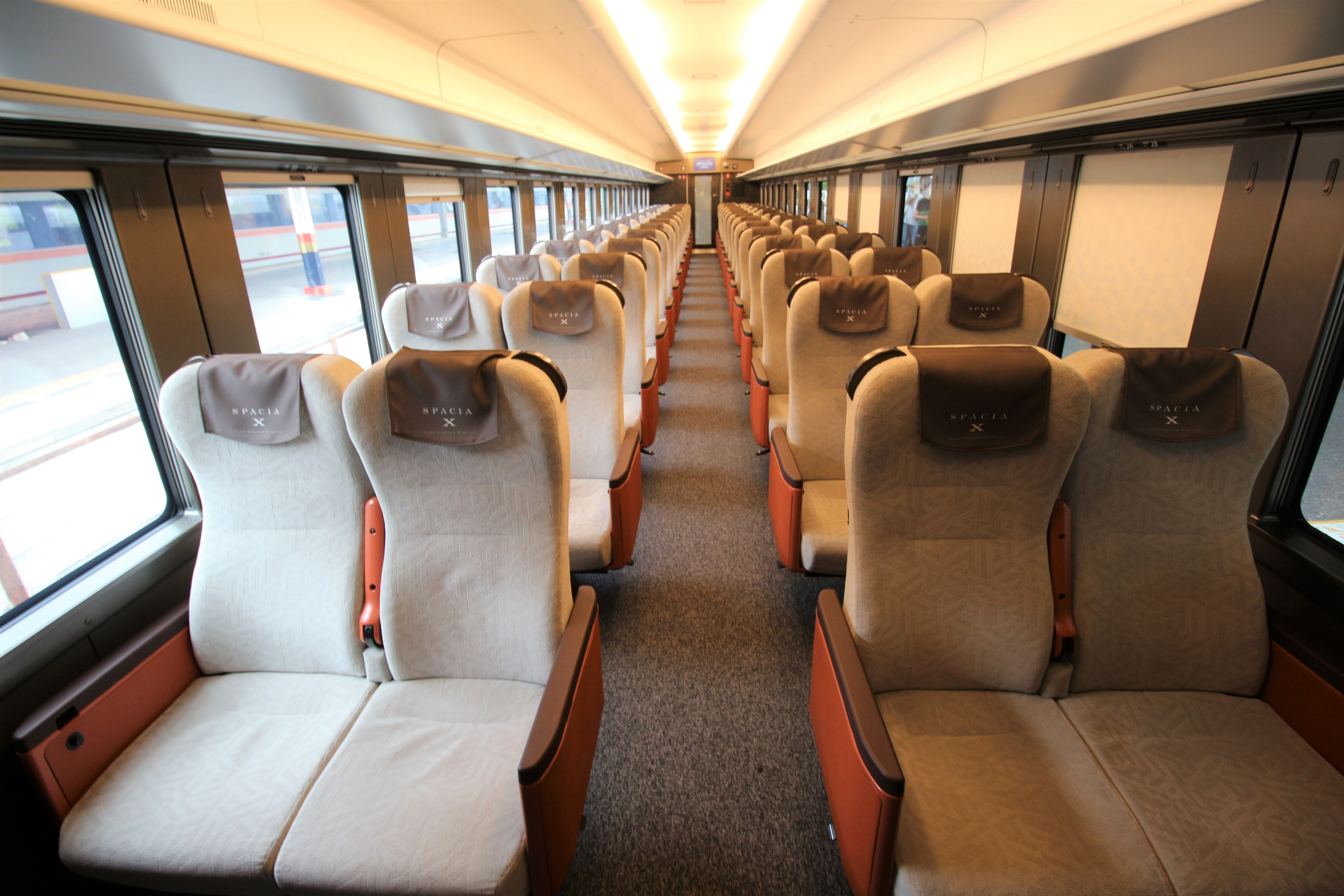
Standard seating (cars 3–5)

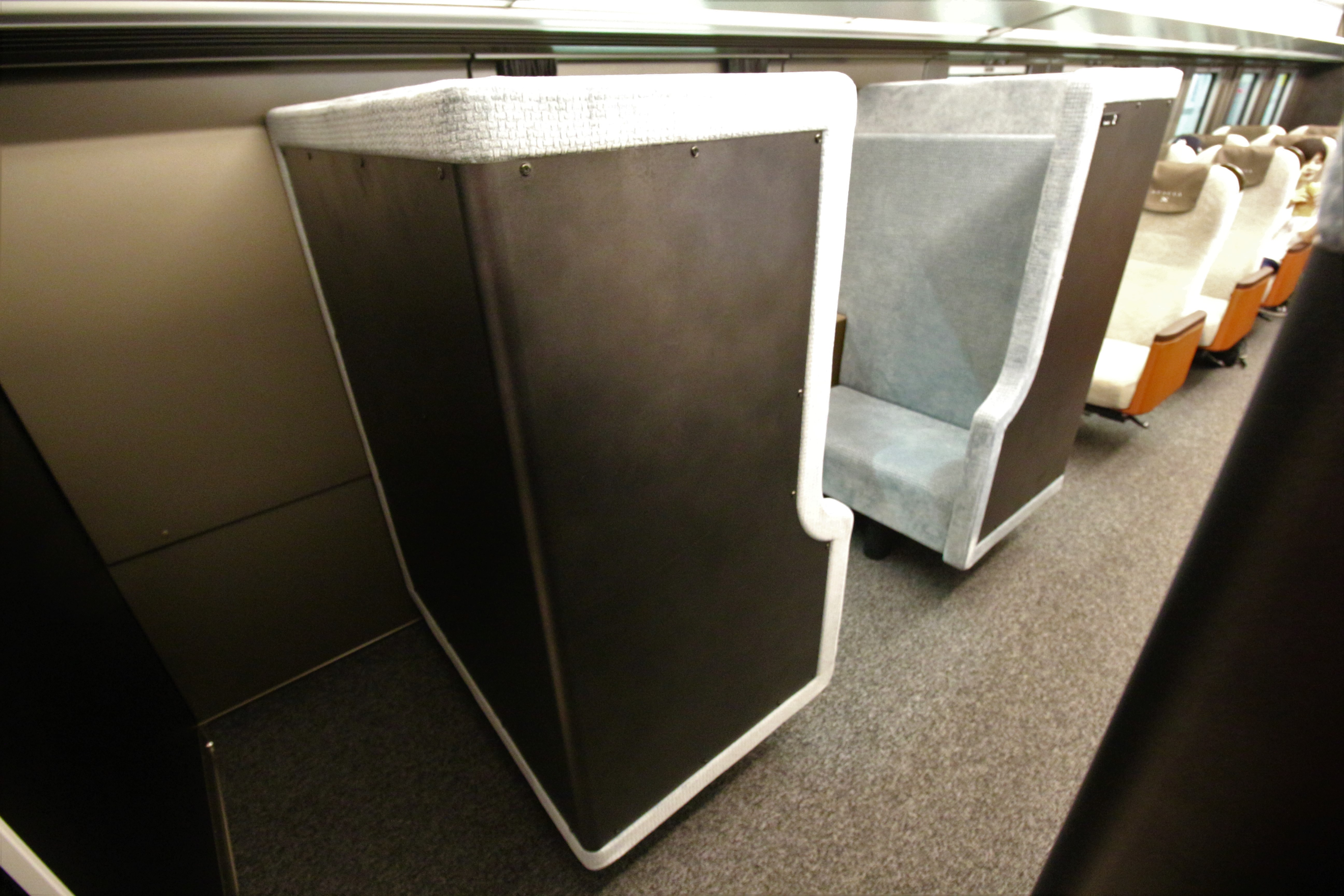
Semi-compartment seating (car 5)

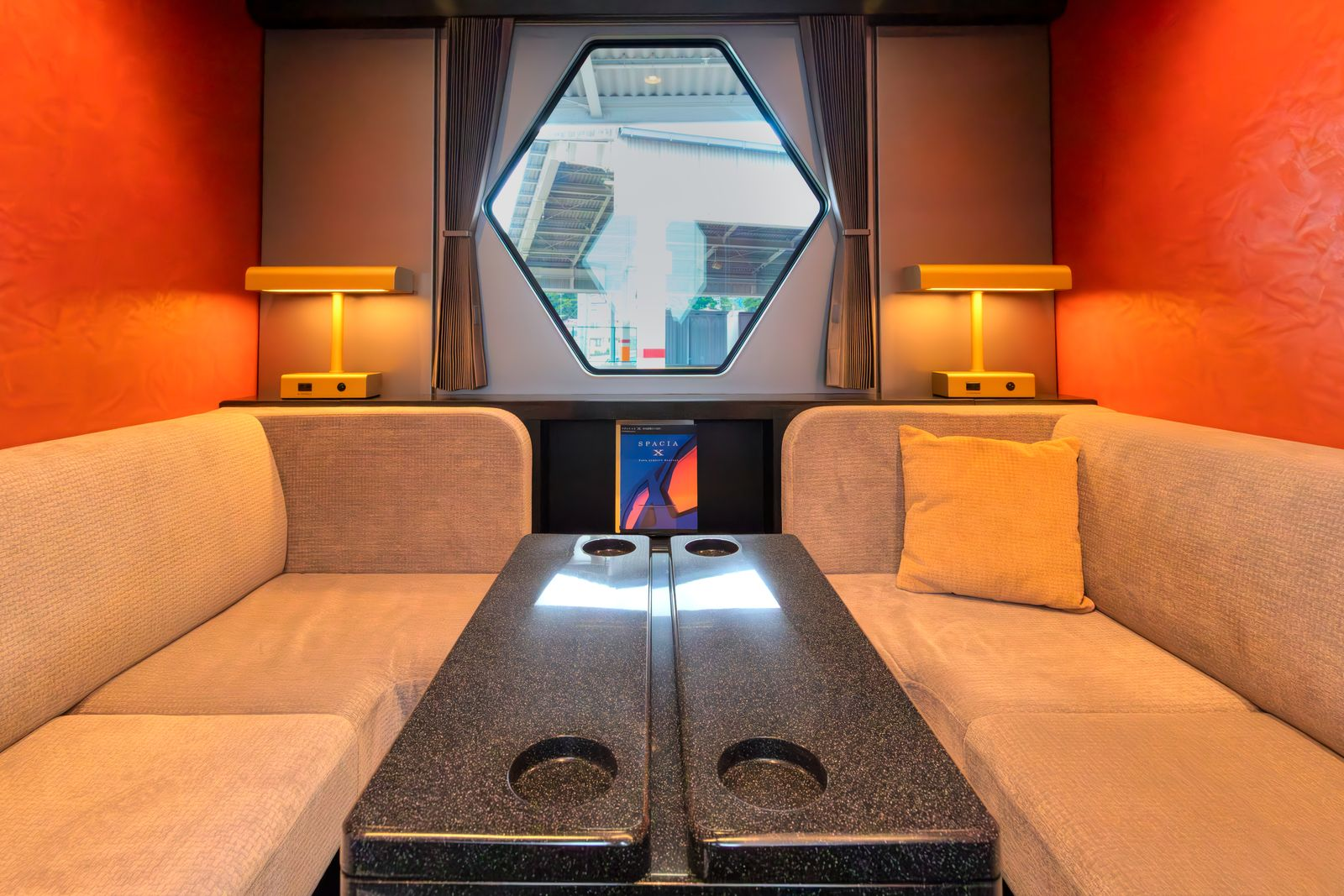
Compartment seating (car 6)

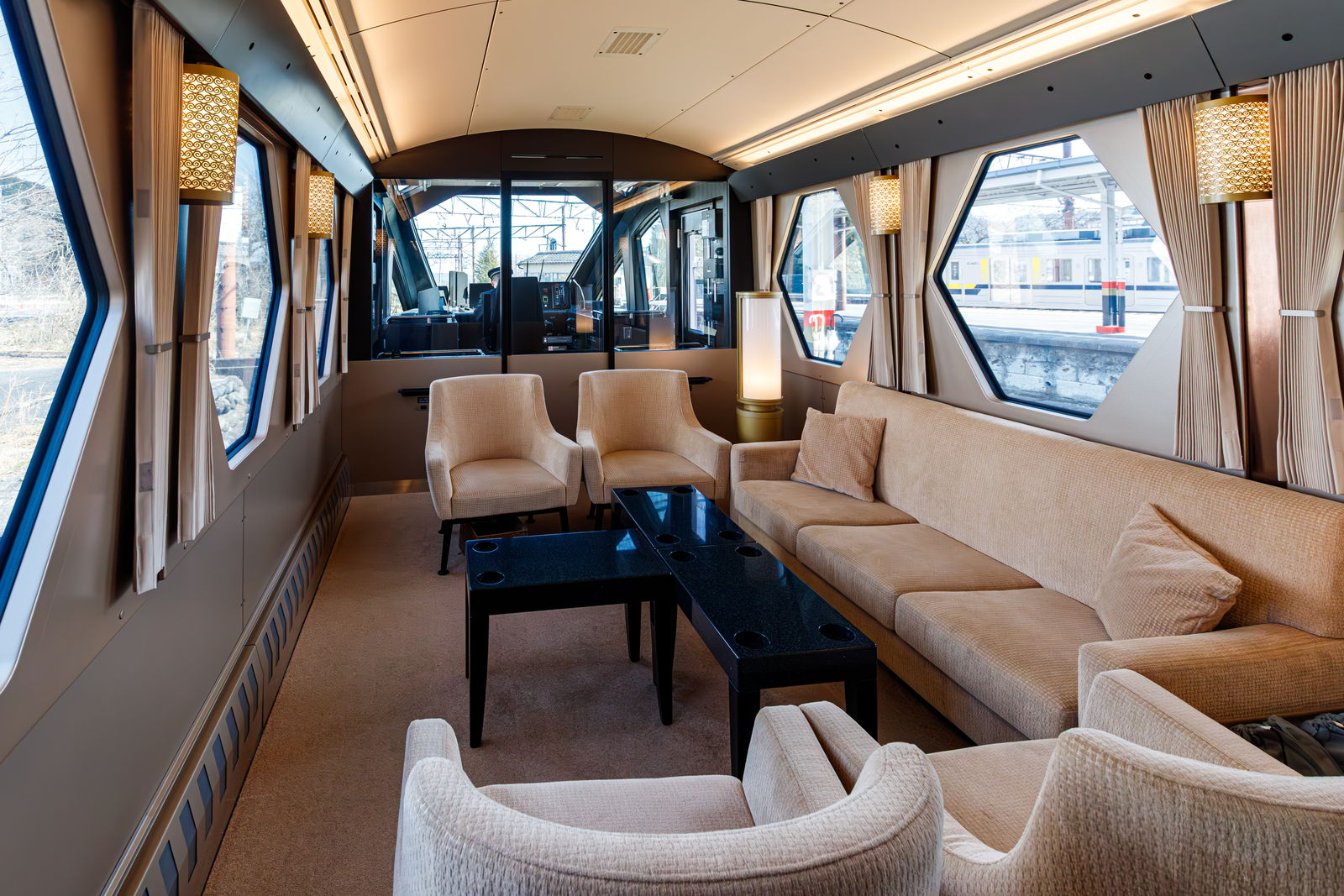
Cockpit Suite (car 6)

== Operations ==
The N100 series fleet operates between Asakusa and Kinugawa-Onsen (or Tobu-Nikko) stations on the Tobu Skytree, Nikko, and Kinugawa lines. Originally, the type only made two round trips per day (four on Thursdays, Fridays, Saturdays, and holidays) but with the start of the 16 March 2024 timetable revision, the frequency was increased to four trips daily throughout the week.

Unlike the 100 series, the N100 series cannot run on JR East lines.

== Formation ==
The N100 series sets consist of four intermediate motored cars with non-powered (trailer) end cars. They are formed as shown below.

	← Asakusa					
Car No.	6	5	4	3	2	1
Designation	N100-1 (Tc1)	N100-2 (M1)	N100-3 (M2)	N100-4 (M3)	N100-5 (M4)	N100-6 (Tc2)

- Cars 3 and 5 are each equipped with two single-arm pantographs.
- Cars 2 and 5 are equipped with toilets.

== See also ==
- Keihan 3000 series, another train type that features external LCD destination displays
