= Hidari Jingorō =

Japanese sculptor and painter (1584–1644)

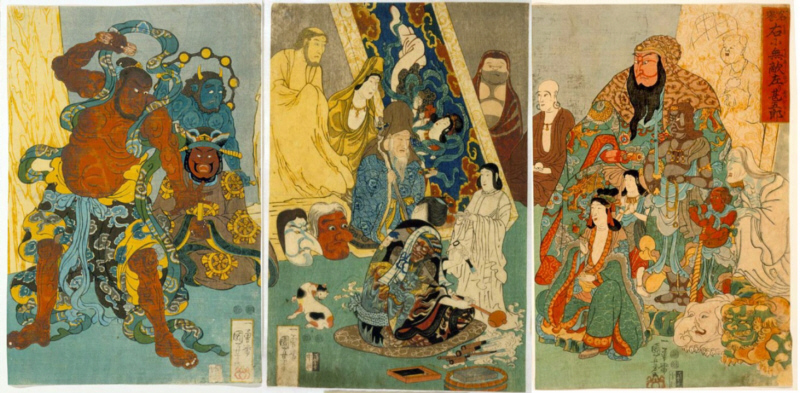
The Famous, the Unrivalled Hidari Jingorō (Meiyo migi ni teki nashi Hidari Jingorō); by Utagawa Kuniyoshi

Hidari Jingorō (左 甚五郎) was a possibly fictitious Japanese artist. Some people and sources state his real name was Itami Toshikatsu. A Renaissance man, he worked as a sculptor, carpenter, painter, architect, comedian, actor, kōdanshi (rhythmical storyteller) and professor of art. Although various studies suggest he was active in the early Edo period (around 1596–1644), there are controversies about the historical existence of the person. Jingorō is believed to have created many famous deity sculptures located throughout Japan, and many legends have been told about him. His famous nemuri-neko ("sleeping cat") carving is located above the Kuguri-mon Gate amidst the sacred mountain shrines and temples of Nikkō, Japan. Amongst these shrines and temples is Nikkō Tōshō-gū, a shrine that honors the Shōgun Tokugawa Ieyasu. The two dragon carvings at the karamon in Ueno Tōshō-gū are also attributed to him.

Other sculptors were reportedly jealous of how skilled a carpenter Hidari was, to the point of chopping off his right arm. However, he was left-handed and was able to keep working, causing him to acquire last name Hidari (meaning "left"). According to another theory, he was an apprentice to a blacksmith and made katana swords. After working there a while, Jingorō felt he deserved to know what temperature the oil was kept at. Against his boss's permission he attempted to test the temperature of the oil by touching it and his boss cut off his right hand. When he realized he could no longer be a blacksmith he became an apprentice for the Chief Architect Hokyo Yoheiji Yusa of the Imperial Court in Kyoto, where he studied how to build temples, shrines, and sculptures.

Stories about Jingorō are well known in Japan. According to one, he saw a woman of exceptional beauty and created a sculpture of her. Jingorō began to drink in the company of the sculpture, and it emotionlessly started to imitate his moves. When a mirror was placed before the sculpture, the woman's spirit came to life.

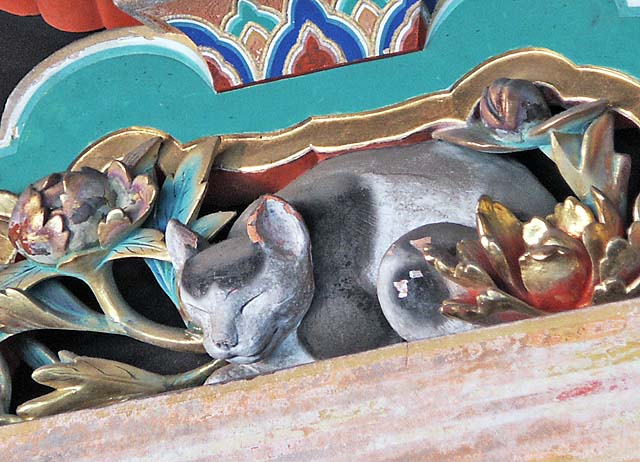
Carving of a sleeping cat at Nikkō Tōshō-gū, said to be the work of Jingorō.

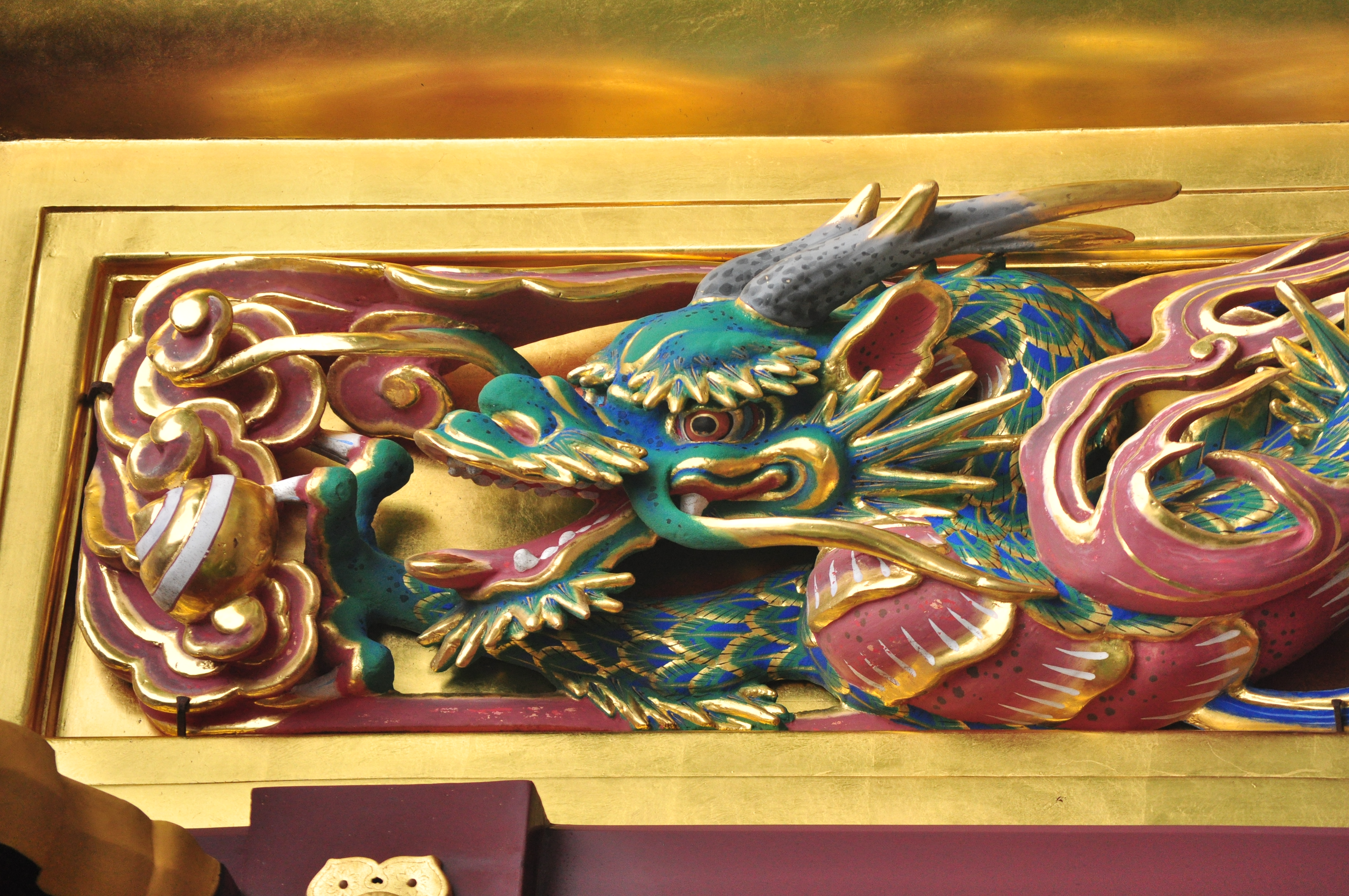
Carving of a dragon at Ueno Tōshō-gū, also attributed to Jingorō.

== See also ==
- Pygmalion (mythology)
