= Tobu 100 series =

Electric multiple unit train operated in Japan by Tobu Railway

Tobu 100 series Spacia
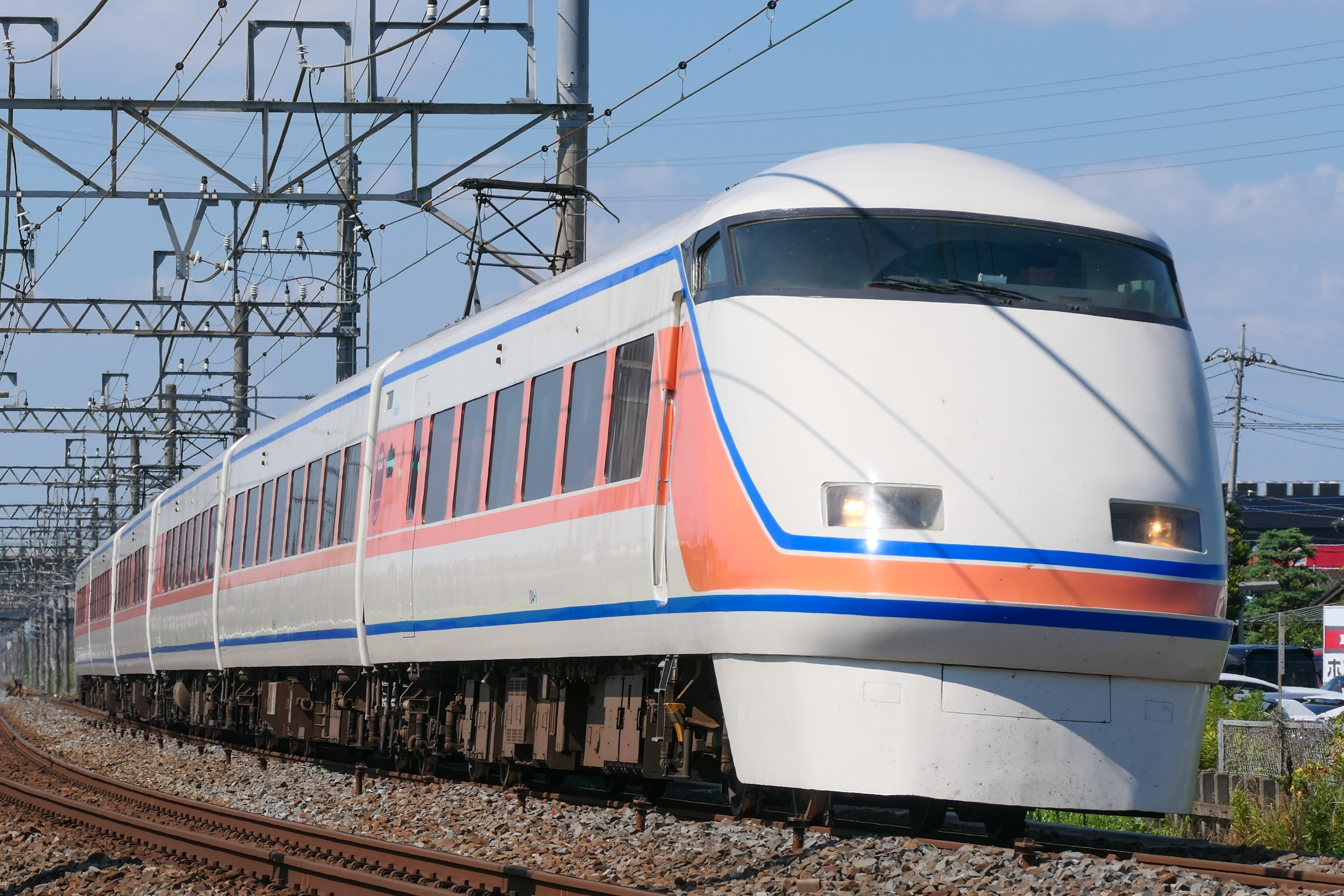
- Set 104 in July 2021
- In service: 1990–present
- Manufacturers: Alna Kōki, Tokyu Car Corporation
- Replaced: 1720 series
- Constructed: 1989–1991
- Entered service: 1 June 1990
- Refurbished: 2011–2012
- Number built: 54 vehicles (9 sets)
- Number in service: 54 vehicles (9 sets)
- Successor: Tobu N100 series
- Formation: 6 cars per trainset
- Fleet numbers: 101–109
- Operator: Tobu Railway
- Depot: Kasukabe
- Lines served: Tobu Skytree Line, Tobu Nikko Line, Tobu Kinugawa Line, Tohoku Main Line

Specifications
- Car body construction: Aluminium
- Car length: 20 m (65 ft 7 in)
- Doors: Sliding plug door, one per side
- Traction system: GTO-VVVF
- Electric systems: 1,500 V DC overhead catenary
- Current collection: Pantograph
- Safety systems: Tobu ATS, ATS-P (three sets)
- Track gauge: 1,067 mm (3 ft 6 in)

Notes/references
- This train won the 34th Blue Ribbon Award in 1991.

The Tobu 100 series (Japanese: 東武100系, romanized: Tōbu 100-kei), branded Spacia (スペーシア), is a limited express electric multiple unit (EMU) train type operated by the private railway operator Tobu Railway in Japan since 1990. The trains are used on Kegon, Spacia Nikko, Kinu, and Spacia Kinugawa services to Nikkō and Kinugawa-Onsen.

== Formation ==
As of 1 April 2012, the fleet consists of nine sets, based at Kasukabe Depot, and formed as follows.

Car No.	1	2	3	4	5	6
Designation	Mc2	M4	M3	M2	M1	Mc1
Numbering	100-6	100-5	100-4	100-3	100-2	100-1

== Interior ==
Seat pitch is 1,100 mm (43 in). Car 6 contains six 4-seat compartments. These are marked as "Green cars" when operating on JR lines.

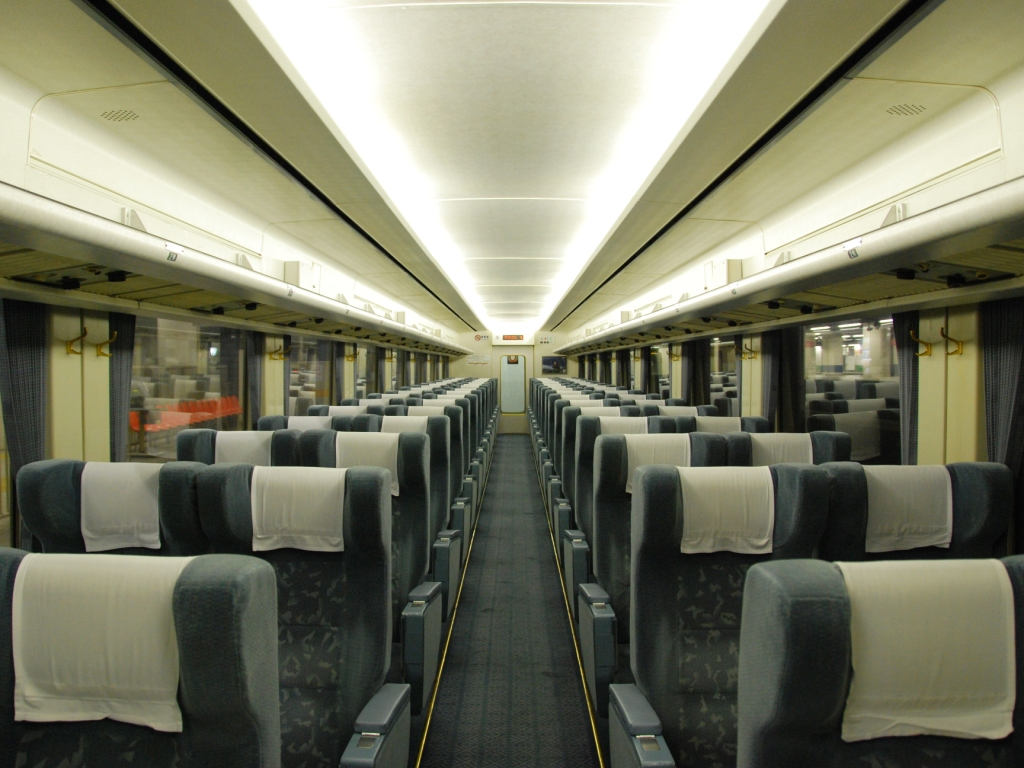
Interior view (before refurbishment)

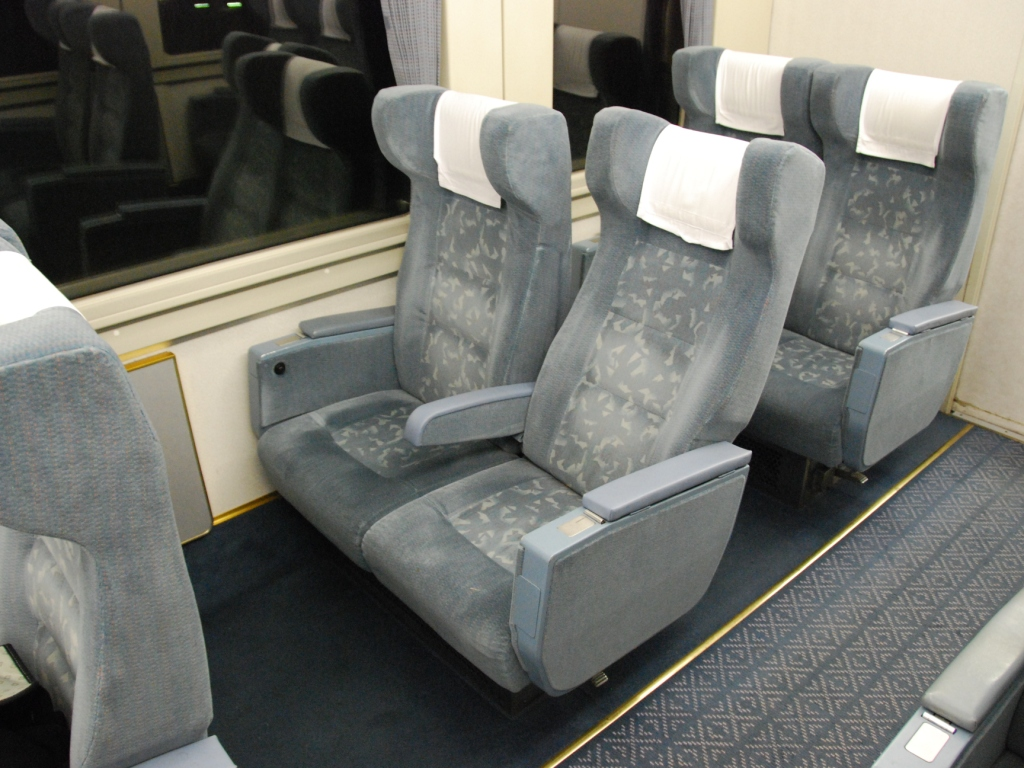
Reclining seats (before refurbishment)

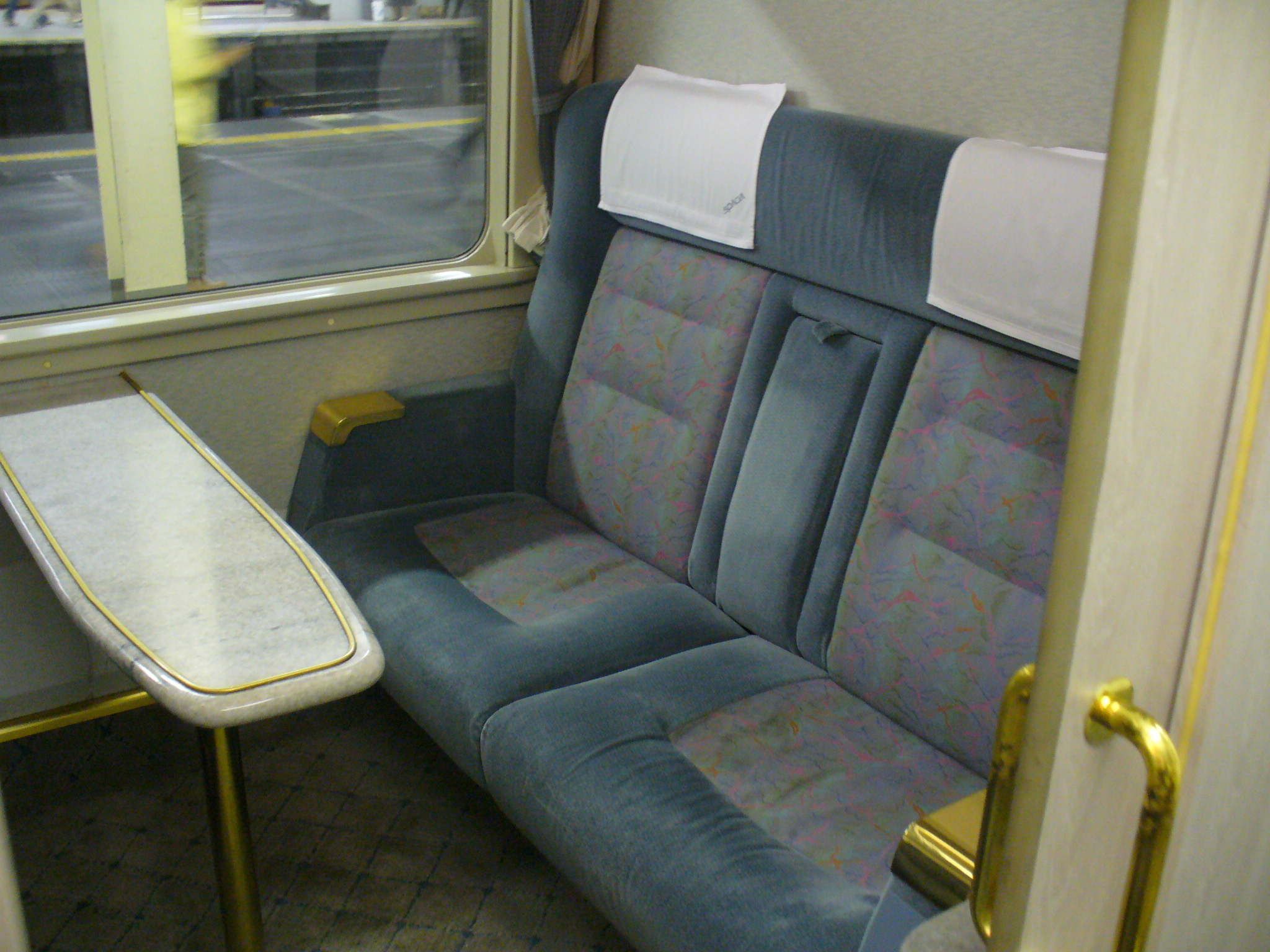
4-seat compartment in Car 6 (before refurbishment)

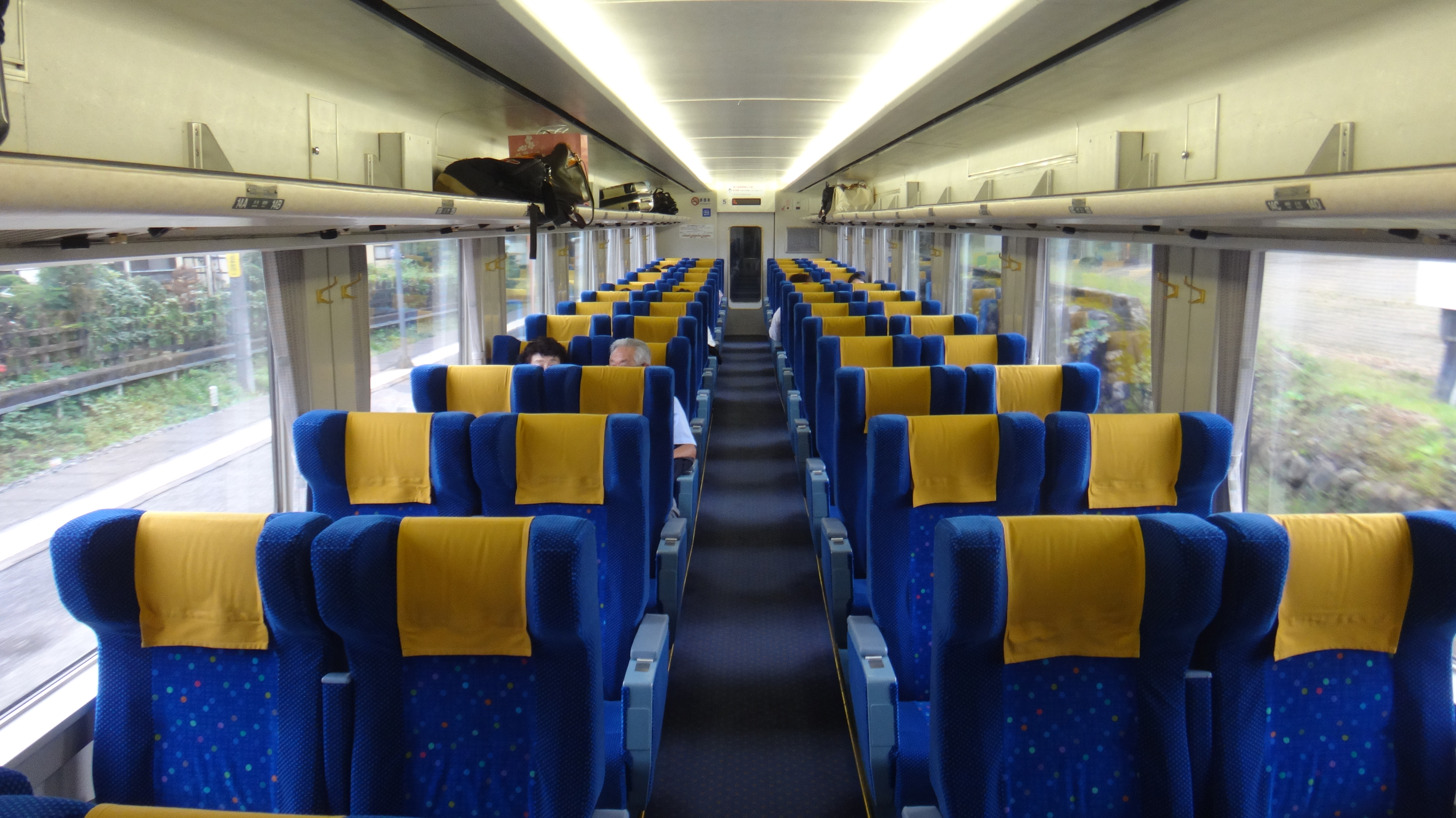
The interior of set 106 in September 2016 (after refurbishment)

== History ==
The 100 series trains entered service on 1 June 1990 on Kegon and Kinu services from Asakusa in Tokyo to Nikkō and Kinugawa-Onsen, replacing the ageing 1720 series trains operating since 1960. Two sets were delivered in fiscal 1989, two more were delivered in fiscal 1990, and five were delivered in fiscal 1991, bringing the fleet to nine sets.

All cars were made no-smoking from 18 March 1995.

On 11 November 2021, Tobu announced that the 100 series fleet would be replaced with new N100 series trains which entered service on 15 July 2023.

=== JR inter-running ===
Through-running Spacia Nikkō and Spacia Kinugawa services from Shinjuku in Tokyo to Tōbu Nikkō and Kinugawa-Onsen via the JR Tōhoku Main Line commenced on 18 March 2006, and three sets (106 to 108) were modified with JR ATS-P for use on JR East lines.

=== Refurbishment ===
The fleet underwent a programme of refurbishment from December 2011, ahead of the opening of the Tokyo Skytree in May 2012. Three trains each were repainted into three different colour schemes, with "miyabi" purple, "iki" light blue, and "sunny coral orange", matching the Tokyo Skytree theme colours, and new "Spacia" logos. Internally, the seats feature new moquette, with blue in the open saloons and brown in the compartments. The first refurbished set re-entered service from 29 December 2011.

Set No.	Colour scheme	Date refurbished	Notes
101	"Deluxe Romance Car" maroon/beige	29 June 2012	Reliveried from "iki" blue in December 2021
102	"miyabi" purple	28 March 2012	
103	"Nikko Moude Spacia" gold/black	2 March 2012	Reliveried from "sunny coral" orange in April 2015
104	"sunny coral" orange	28 September 2012	
105	"miyabi" purple	28 December 2011	
106	"Nikko Moude Spacia" gold/black	25 July 2012	Reliveried from "sunny coral" orange in July 2015
107	"miyabi" purple	31 May 2012	
108	"iki" blue	27 April 2012	
109	"Strawberry Spacia" pink/red	3 February 2012	Reliveried from "iki" blue in June 2021; Reliveried from revival original livery in December 2023

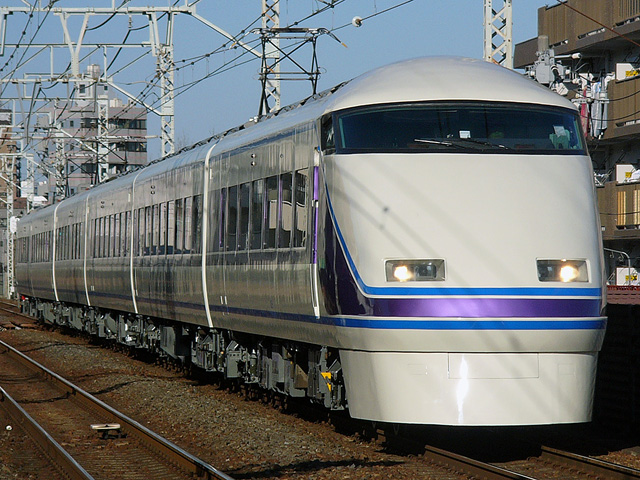
First refurbished set, 105, in "miyabi" purple livery, December 2011

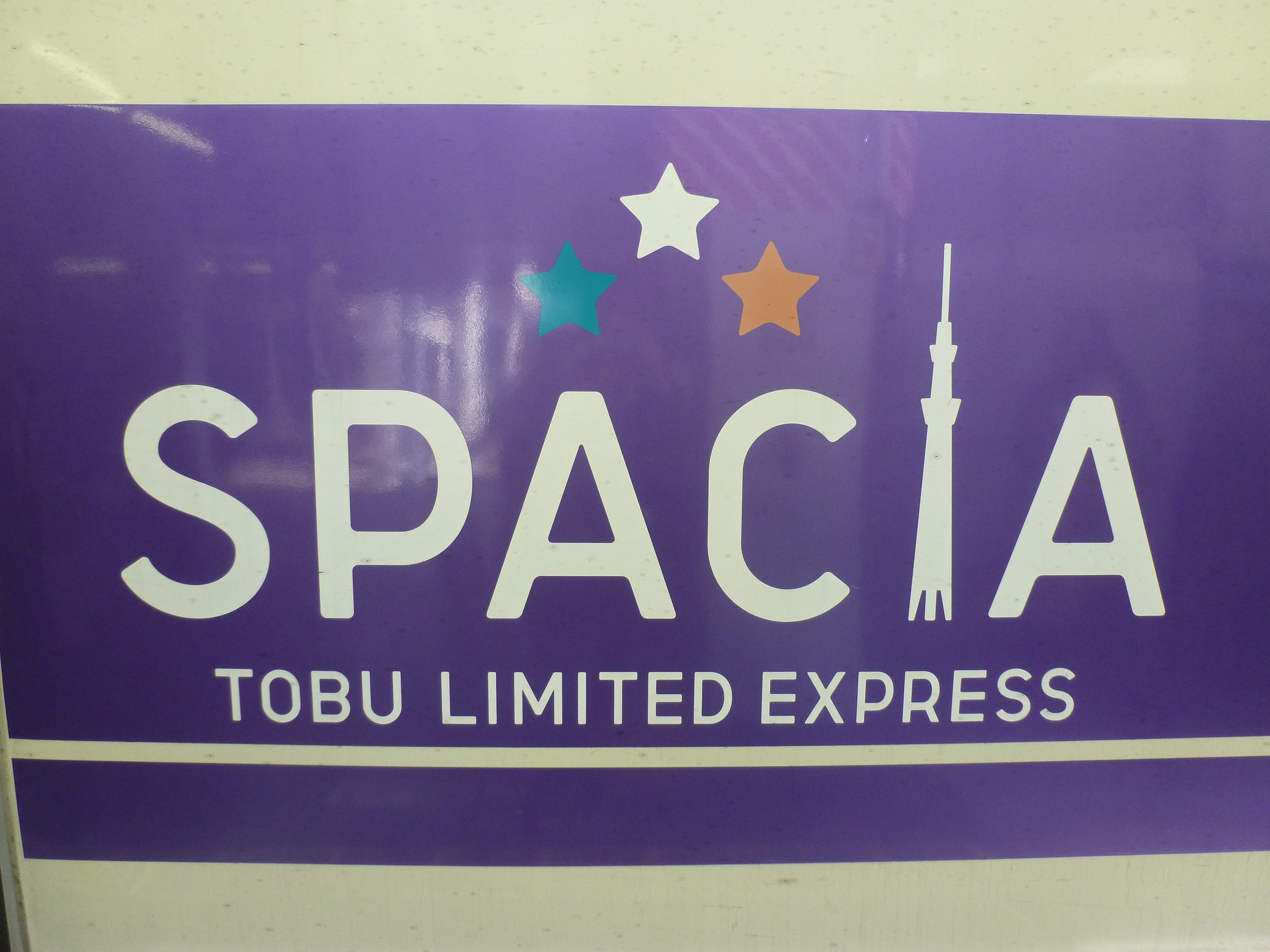
"Miyabi" purple Spacia logo

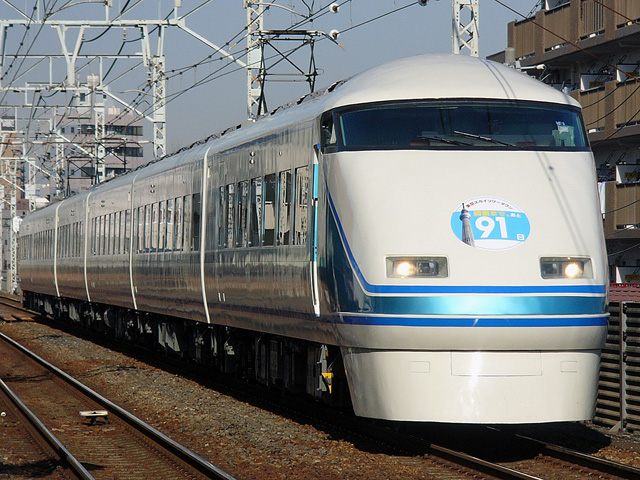
Refurbished set 109 in "iki" blue livery, February 2012

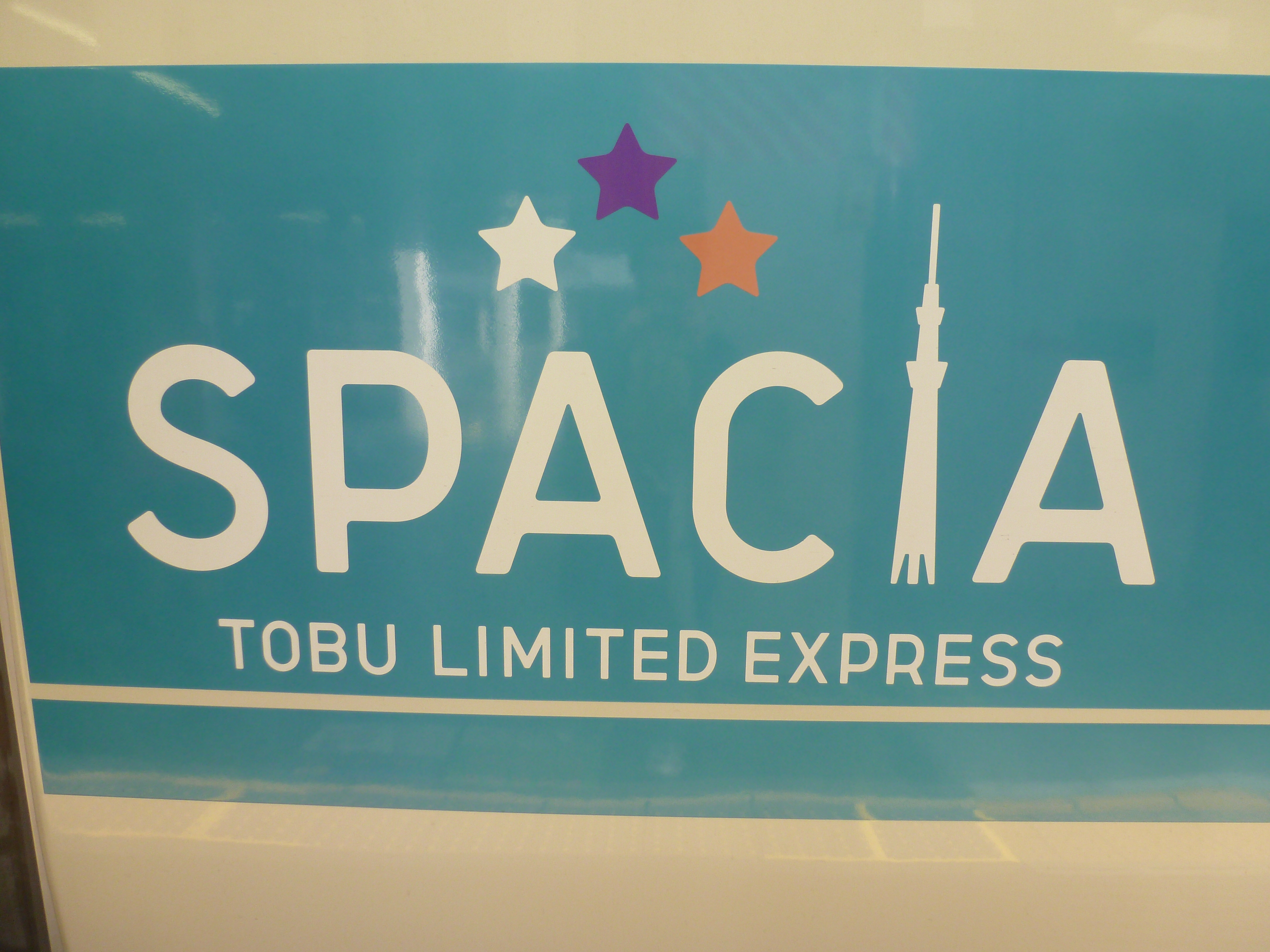
"Iki" blue Spacia logo

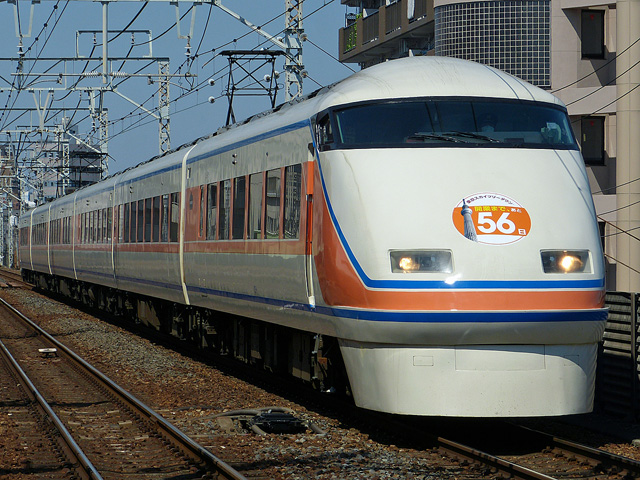
Refurbished set 103 in "sunny coral" orange livery, March 2012

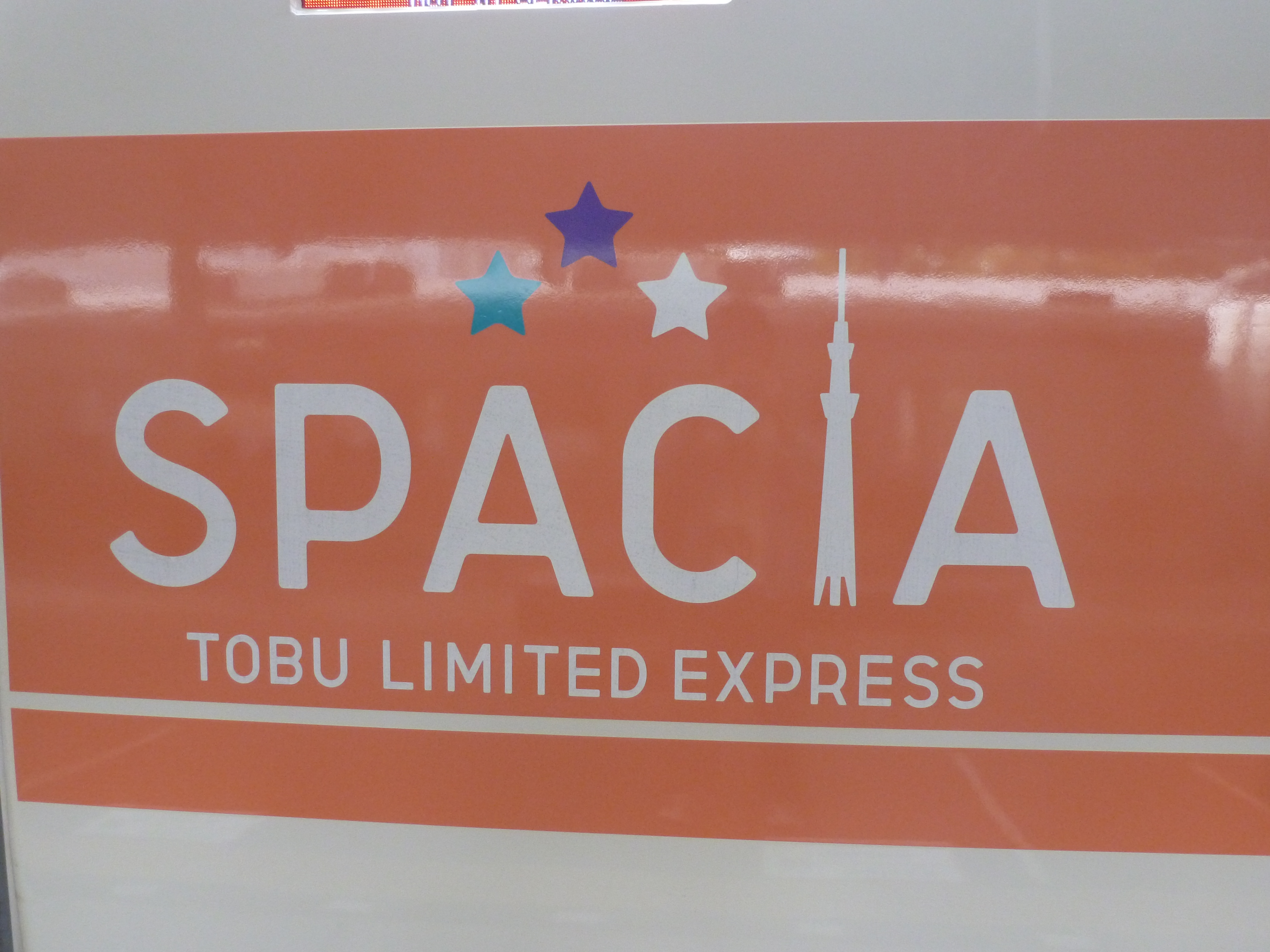
"Sunny coral" orange Spacia logo

== Special liveries ==
=== Nikko Moude Spacia ===
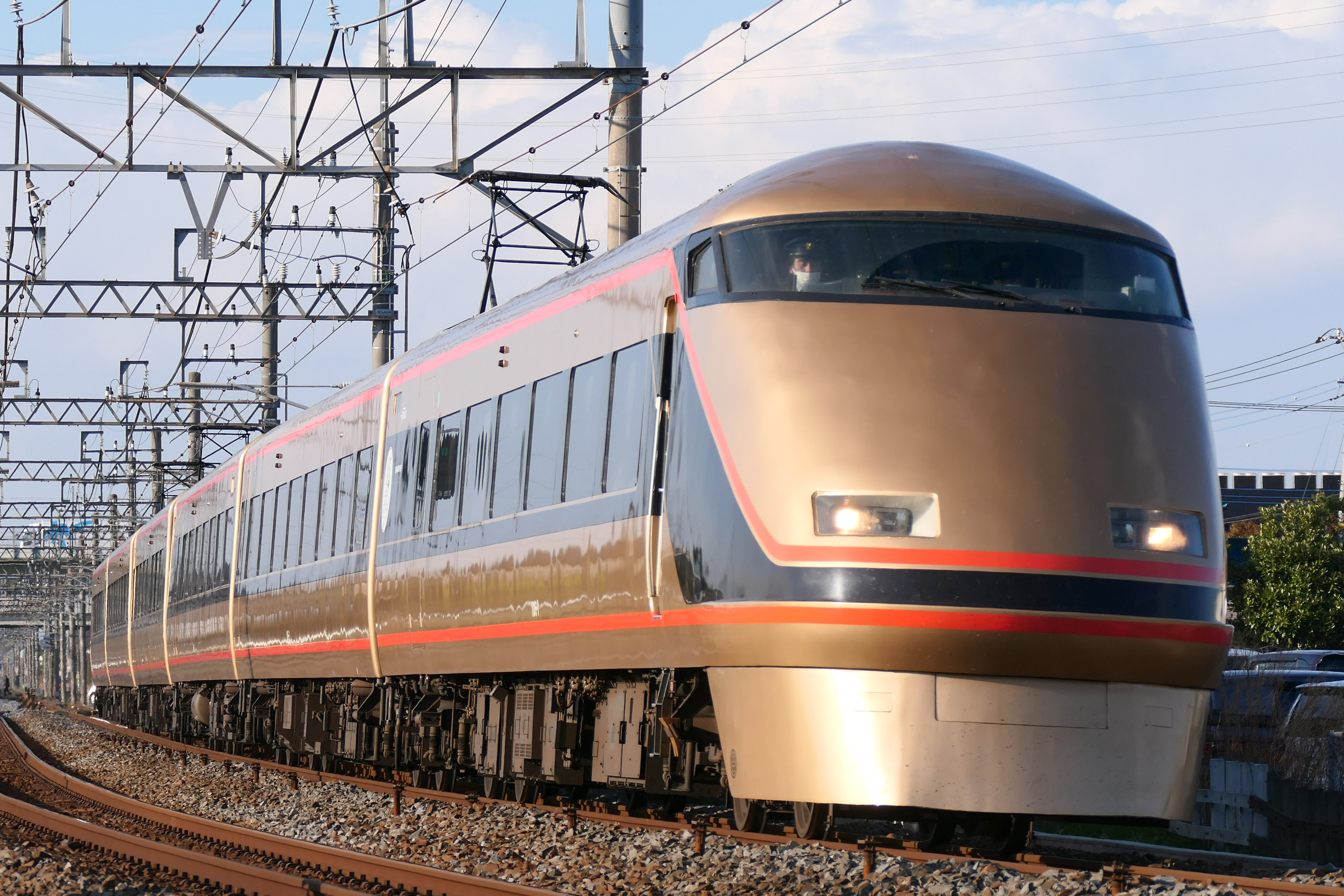
Set 106 in "Nikko Moude Spacia" gold and black livery, April 2021

Set 103 was repainted in a special gold and black livery and branded "Nikko Moude Spacia" (日光詣スペーシア) from April 2015. This was followed in July 2015 by set 106, which was similarly reliveried.

=== Deluxe Romance Car ===
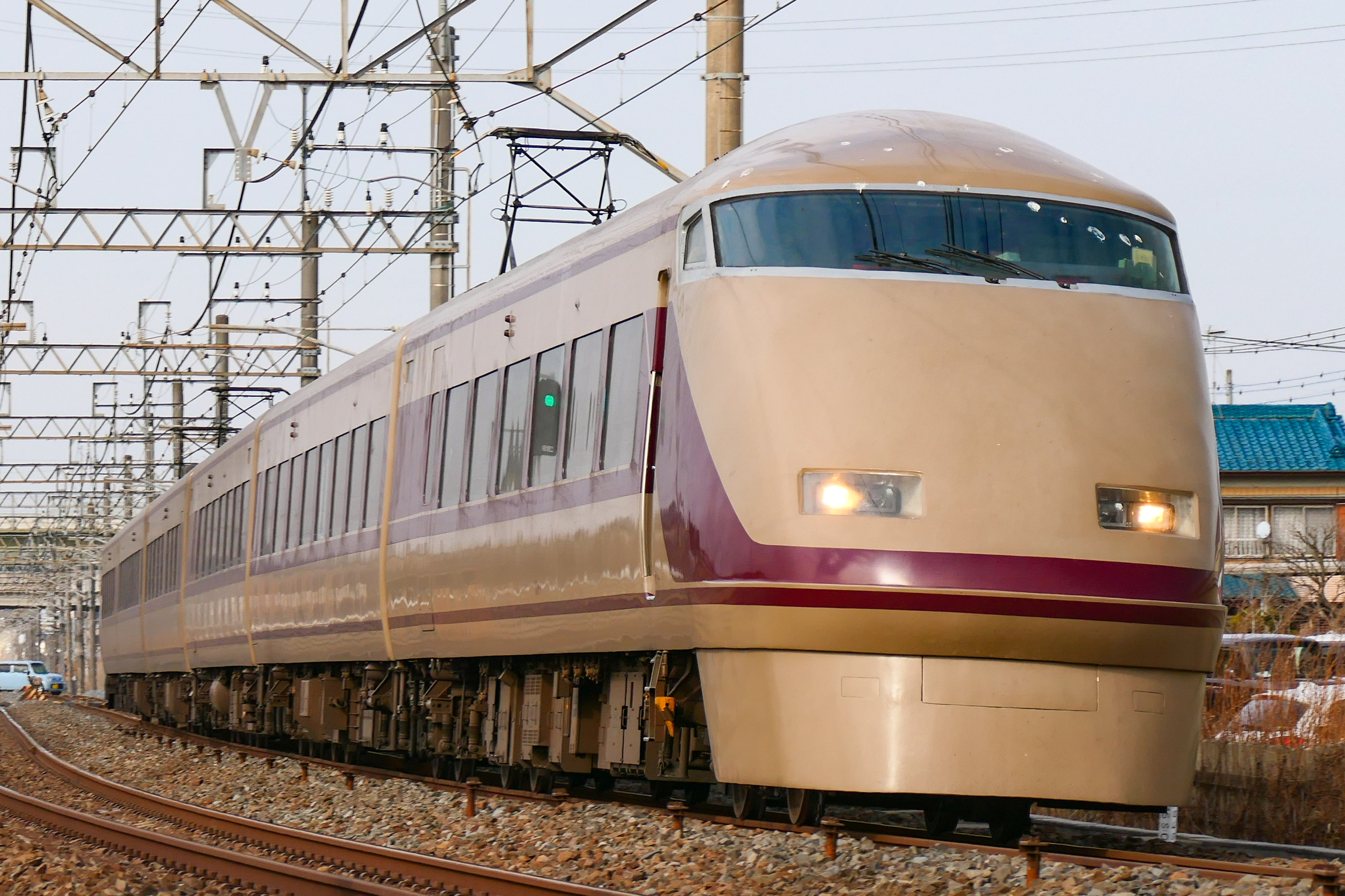
Set 101 in "Deluxe Romance Car" maroon and beige livery, February 2023

In December 2021, to commemorate the 30th anniversary of the introduction of the 100 series, set 101 was repainted in a maroon and beige livery inspired by that of the 1720 series sets they replaced.

=== Classic ===
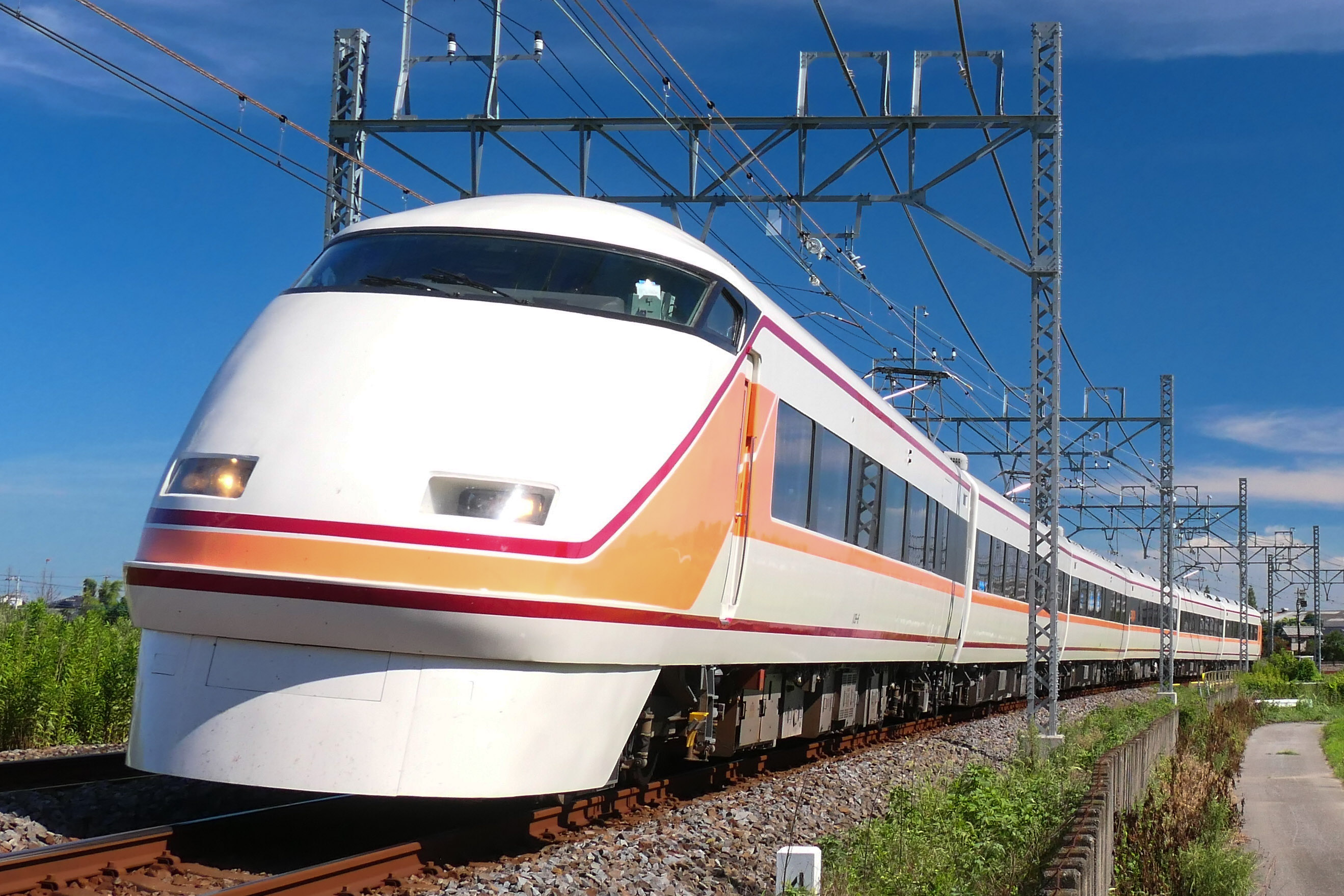
Set 109 in original red and orange livery, August 2021

Set 109 was repainted in the original 100 series livery from June 2021.

=== Strawberry Spacia ===
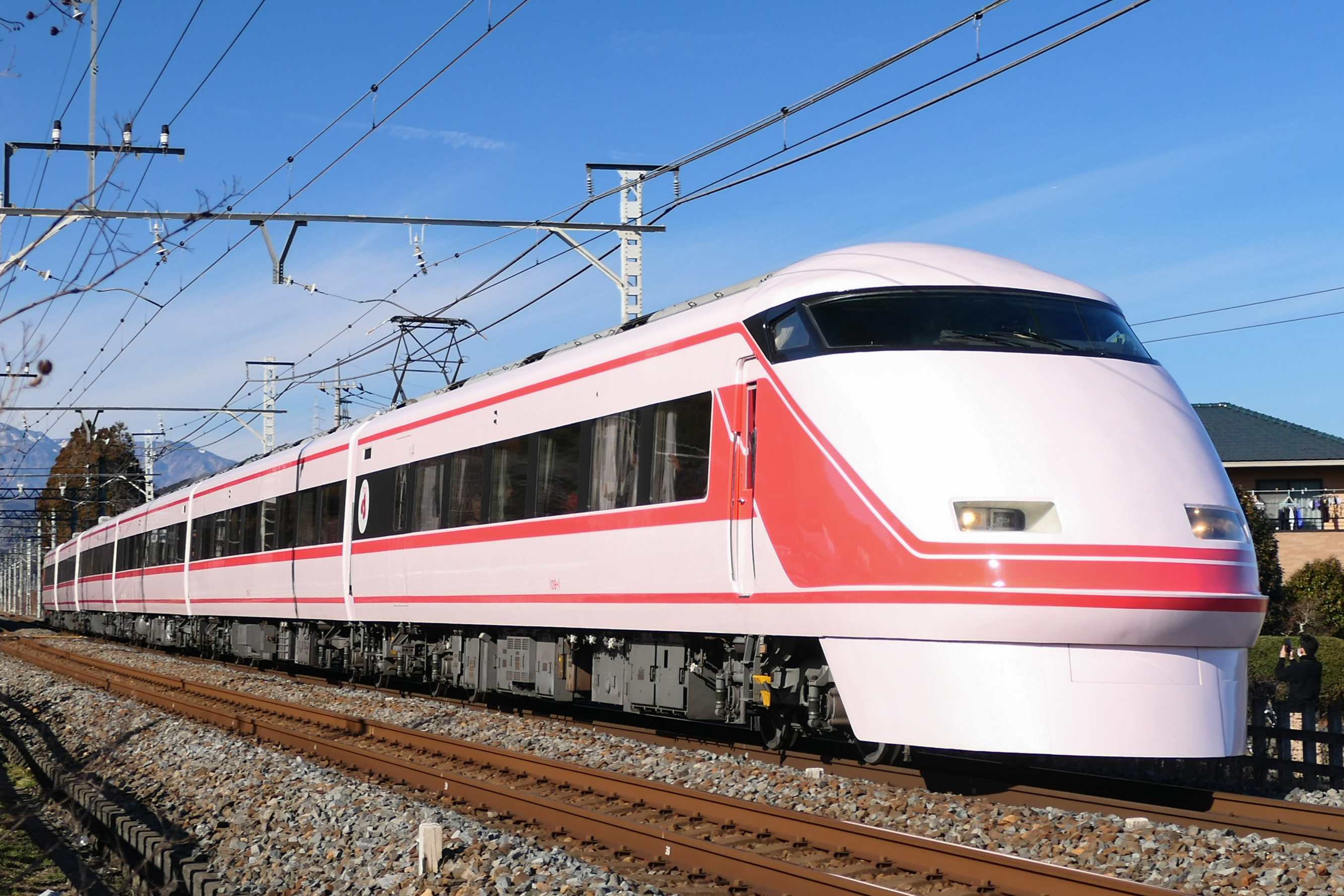
Set 109 in strawberry livery, January 2024

Set 109 returned to service on 24 December 2023 in a pink and red "Strawberry Spacia" (いちごスペーシア) livery to commemorate the 150th anniversary of the founding of Tochigi Prefecture.
