= Nemuri-neko =

Famous Japanese wood carving

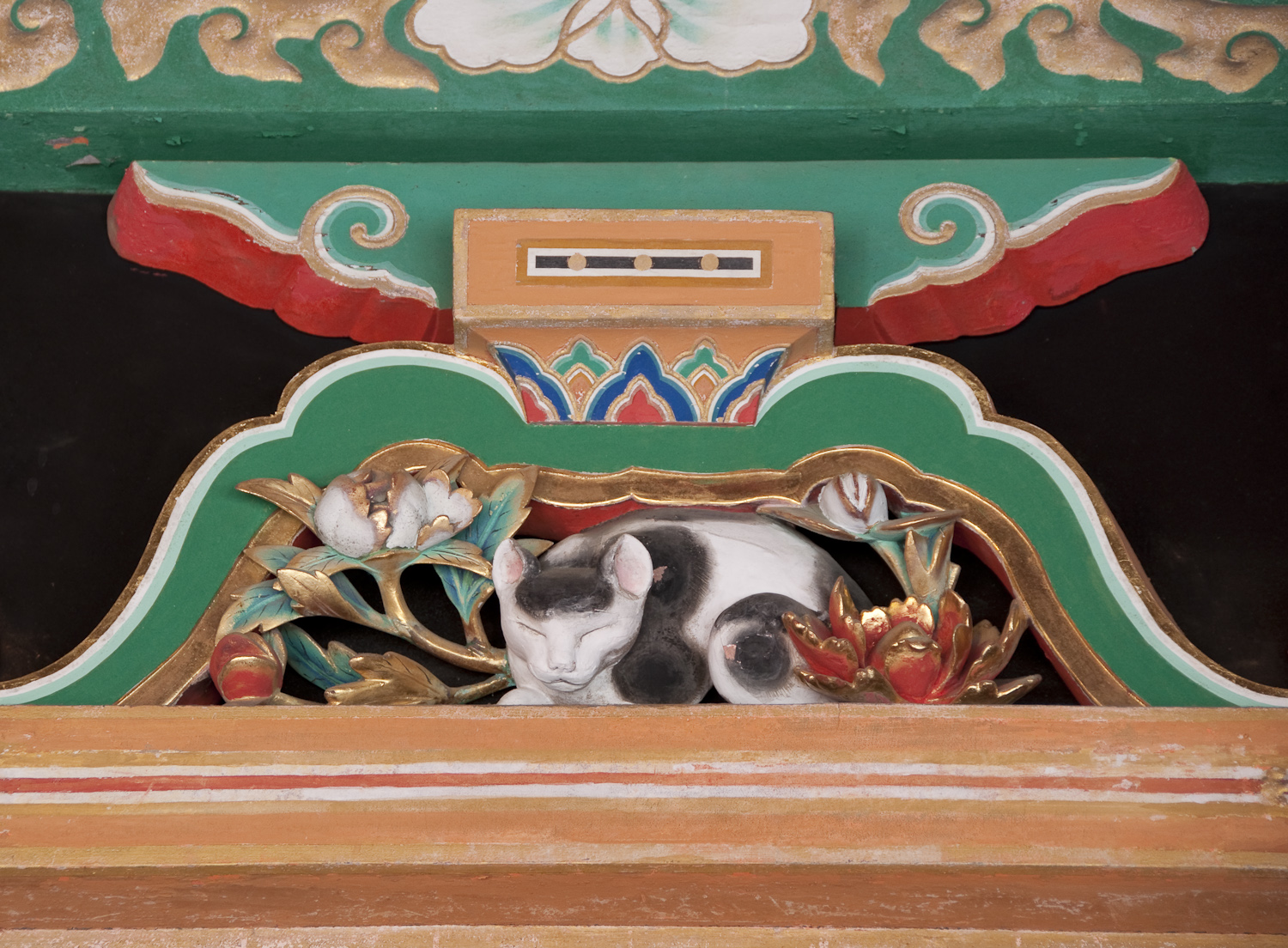
The Nemuri-neko at Tōshō-gū

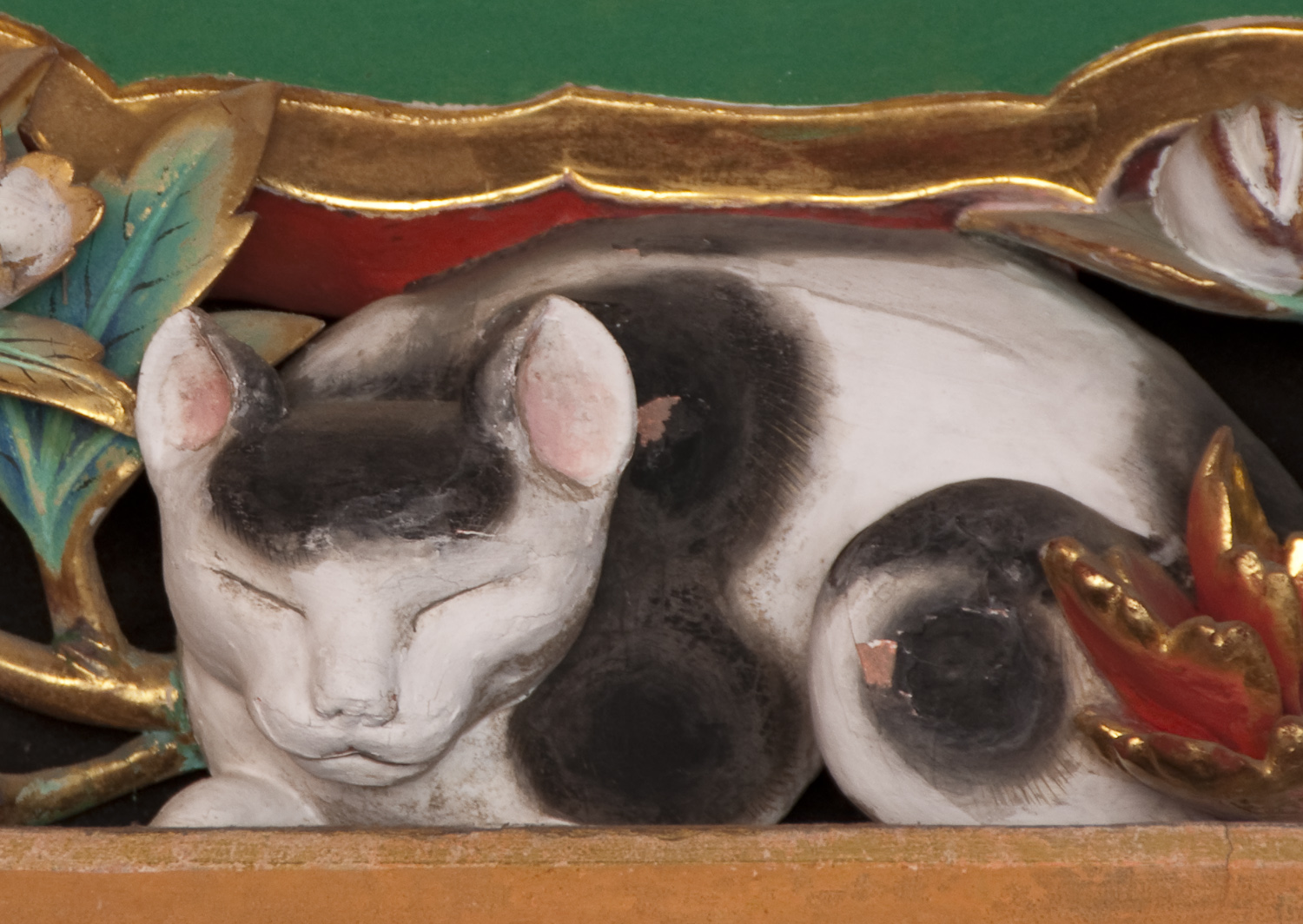
The close-up image of the cat

Nemuri-neko (眠り猫 or 眠猫, "sleeping cat", from nemuri, "sleeping/peaceful" and neko, "cat") is a famous wood carving by Hidari Jingorō (左甚五郎) located in the East corridor at Nikkō Tōshō-gū Shrine (日光東照宮) in Nikkō, Japan.

Zempei Matsumura in Nikkō Tōshō-gū Shrine and Jingorō Hidari published by Nohi Publishing Company in 1975, wrote:

Hidari Jingorō loved cats and was fascinated by cats. Jingorō spent eight months in seclusion to refine his knowledge and technique in wood sculpturing. He spent the majority of his time studying, sculpturing, and carving wooden cats that appeared lifelike in various shapes.

According to Matsumura, it was Jingorō's goal to carve and sculpture lifelike cats by making "utmost efforts in the future to create a new style in the field of sculpturing".

Prior to his seclusion, Jingorō was an apprentice for the Chief Architect Hokyo Yoheiji Yusa of the Imperial Court in Kyoto where he studied how to build temples, shrines, and sculptures.

Through Jingorō's insight and new technique, animal sculpturing would take a new direction in Japan, a realistic appearance of an animal due to fine detailed sculpturing by the artist. Jingorō's approach in detailed wood sculpturing would later have an effect in other areas of Japanese art, namely, ceramic animals.

Examples of Nemuri-neko can be found throughout Japanese history, especially in ceramic arts. Collectors favor their resemblance to real cats.

Matsumura also states, Nemuri Neko "Sleeping Cat symbolizes Nikkō or the Spirit of Ieyasu, who was thought to be the manifestation of Yakushi Nyorai", the Buddha of Healing, who offers medicinal remedies, gives nourishment to the mind, body, and spirit, and comforts the sick and cures illnesses.

The nemuri neko is a National Treasure in Japan, and has been of inspiration to Japanese artists and artists around the world for centuries.

== Gallery ==
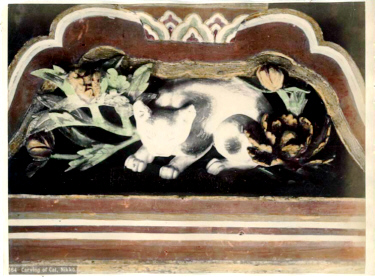
Circa 1893 hand-colored collotype photograph by the famous Japan photographer, Kazumasa Ogawa, showing close-up -wood carving of nemuri-neko sleeping cat at Nikkō Tōshō-gū Shrine.

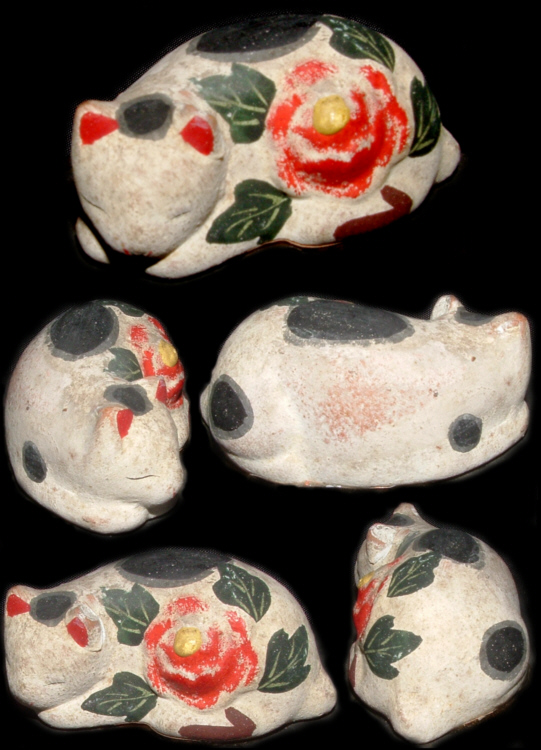
Photograph showing ningyo clay doll depicting nemuri-neko sleeping cat hand painted with peony

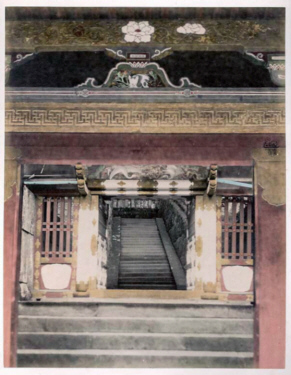
Circa 1890s albumen photograph showing carving of nemuri-neko sleeping cat above kugurimon gate

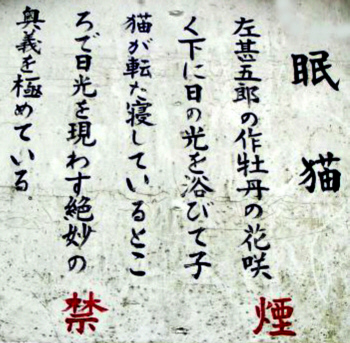
Photograph showing close-up wooden prayer board of nemurineko sleeping cat, reads 眠猫 左甚五郎の作牡丹の花咲く下に日の光を浴びて子猫が転た寝しているところで日光を現わす絶妙の奥義を極めている。
