= Nikkō Tōshō-gū =

Shinto shrines in Tochigi Prefecture, Japan

Nikkō Tōshō-gū 日光東照宮
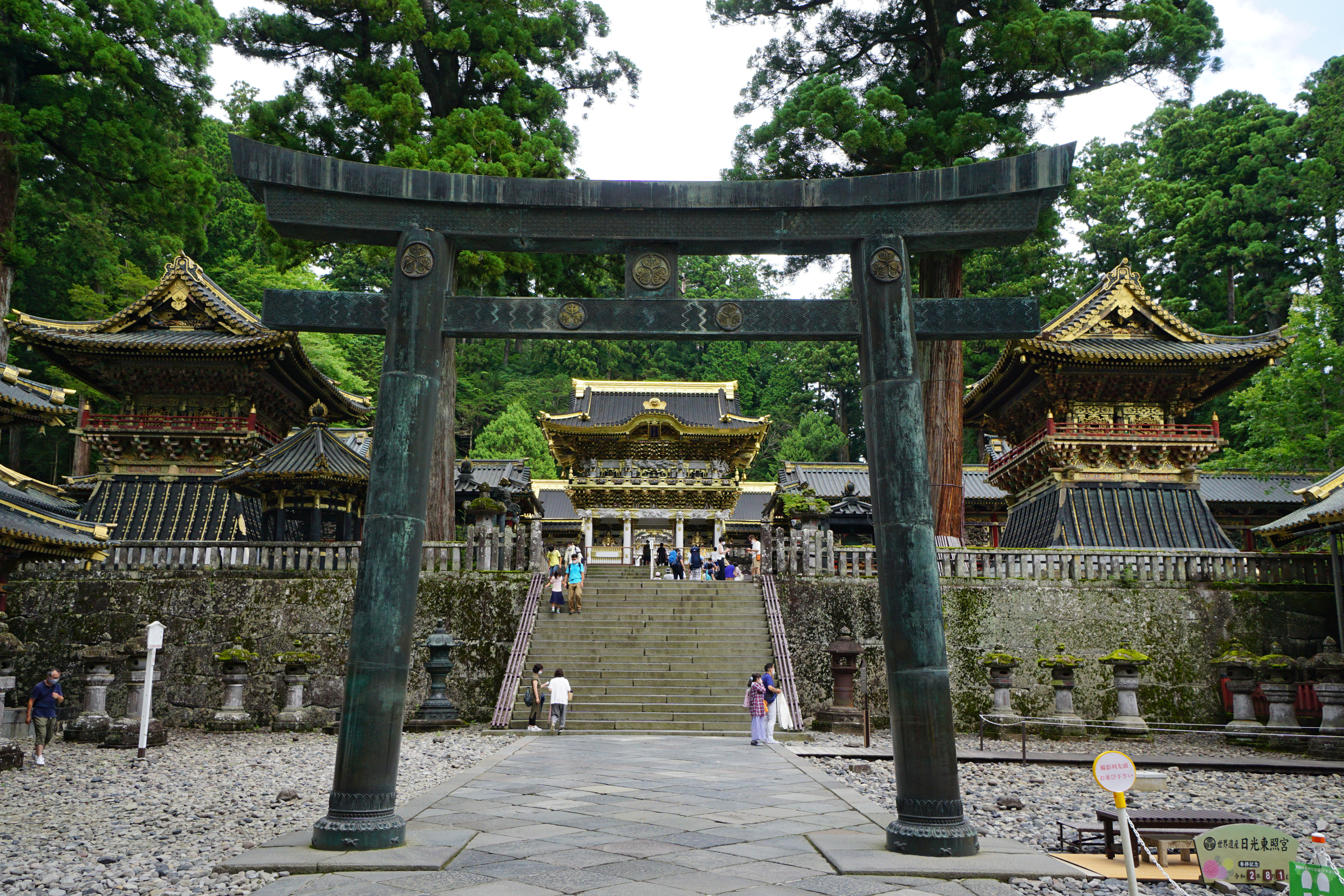

- Location within Japan

Religion
- Affiliation: Shinto
- Deity: Tokugawa Ieyasu
- Type: Tōshō-gū

Location
- Location: 2301 Sannai, Nikko, Tochigi Prefecture 〒 321-1431
- Coordinates: 36.758064°N 139.598958°E

Architecture
- Style: Gongen-zukuri
- Established: 1617

Website
- www.toshogu.or.jp/english/

Nikkō Tōshō-gū (日光東照宮) is a Tōshō-gū Shinto shrine located in Nikkō, Tochigi Prefecture, Japan.

Together with Futarasan Shrine and Rinnō-ji, it forms the Shrines and Temples of Nikkō UNESCO World Heritage Site, with 42 structures of the shrine included in the nomination. Five of them are designated as National Treasures of Japan, and three more as Important Cultural Properties.

== History ==
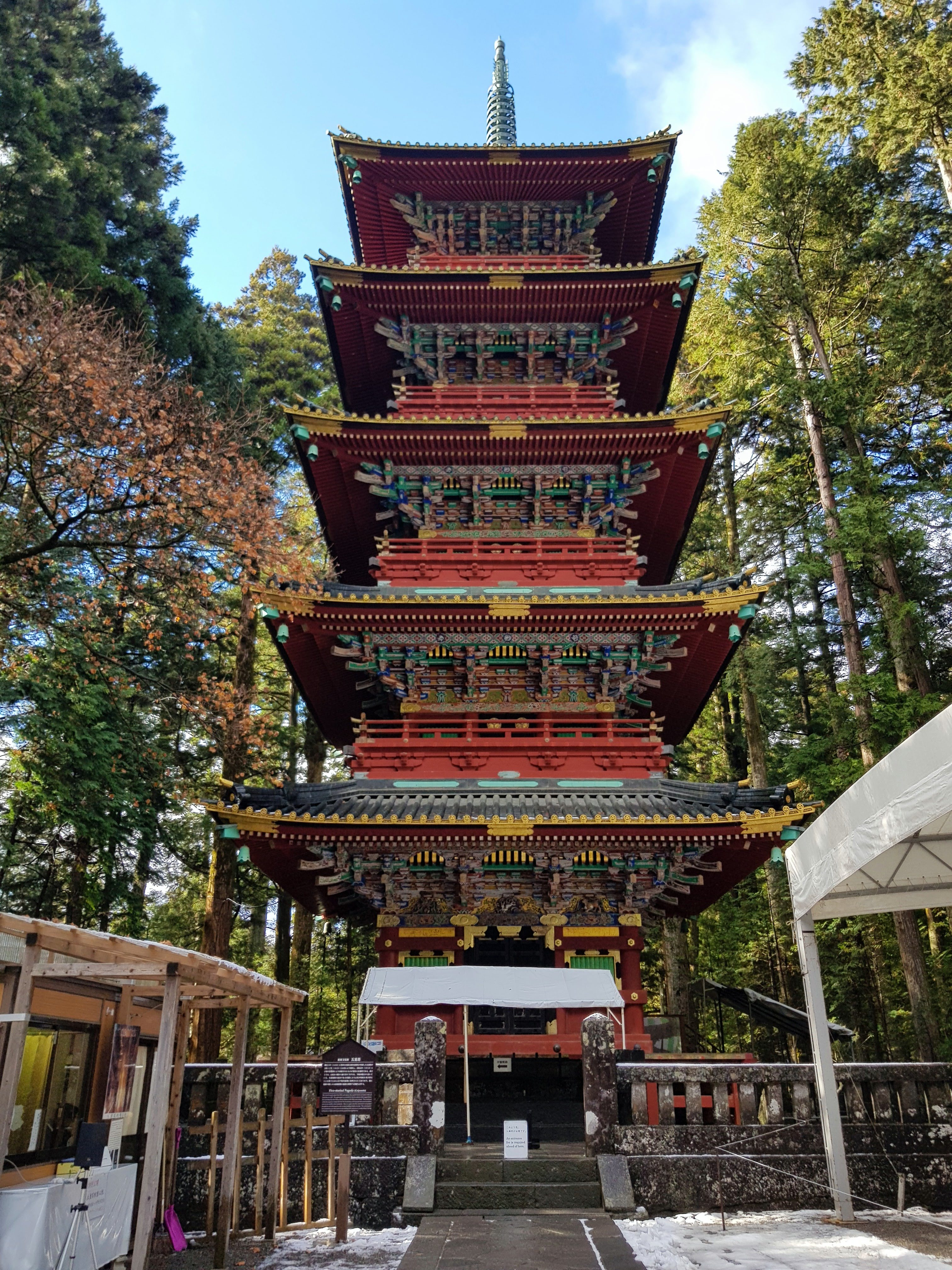
Five-story pagoda at Nikkō Tōshō-gū

Tōshō-gū is dedicated to Tokugawa Ieyasu, the founder of the Tokugawa shogunate. It was initially built in 1617, during the Edo period, while Ieyasu's son Hidetada was shōgun. It was enlarged during the time of the third shōgun, Iemitsu. Ieyasu is enshrined there, where his remains are also entombed. This shrine was built by Tokugawa retainer Tōdō Takatora.

During the Edo period, the Tokugawa shogunate carried out stately processions from Edo to the Nikkō Tōshō-gū along the Nikkō Kaidō. The shrine's annual spring and autumn festivals reenact these occasions, and are known as "processions of a thousand warriors". Cedar trees line the roadway, termed the Cedar Avenue of Nikkō.

Five structures at Nikkō Tōshō-gū are categorized as National Treasures of Japan, and three more as Important Cultural Properties. Additionally, two swords in the possession of the shrine are National Treasures, and many other objects are Important Cultural Properties. Famous buildings at the Tōshō-gū include the richly decorated Yōmeimon (陽明門), a gate that is also known as "higurashi no mon no kei". The latter name means that one could look at it until sundown, and not tire of seeing it. Carvings in deep relief, painted in rich colors, decorate the surface of the structure. The next gate is the karamon decorated with white ornaments. Located nearby is a woodcarving of a sleepy cat, "Nemuri-neko", attributed to Hidari Jingorō.

The stable of the shrine's sacred horses bears a carving of the three wise monkeys, who hear, speak and see no evil, a traditional symbol in Japanese culture that is derived from a quote in the Analects.

The original five-storey pagoda was donated by a daimyō in 1650, but it was burned down during a fire, and was rebuilt in 1818. Each storey represents an element—earth, water, fire, wind and aether (or void)—in ascending order. Inside the pagoda, a central shinbashira pillar hangs from chains to minimize damage from earthquakes.

Hundreds of stone steps lead through the cryptomeria forest up to the grave of Ieyasu. A torii at the top bears calligraphy attributed to Emperor Go-Mizunoo. A bronze urn contains the remains of Tokugawa Ieyasu.

In 2008, Yuri Kawasaki became the first female Shinto priest ever to serve at Nikkō Tōshō-gū.

== Gallery ==
Yomeimon gate at Nikko Toshogu

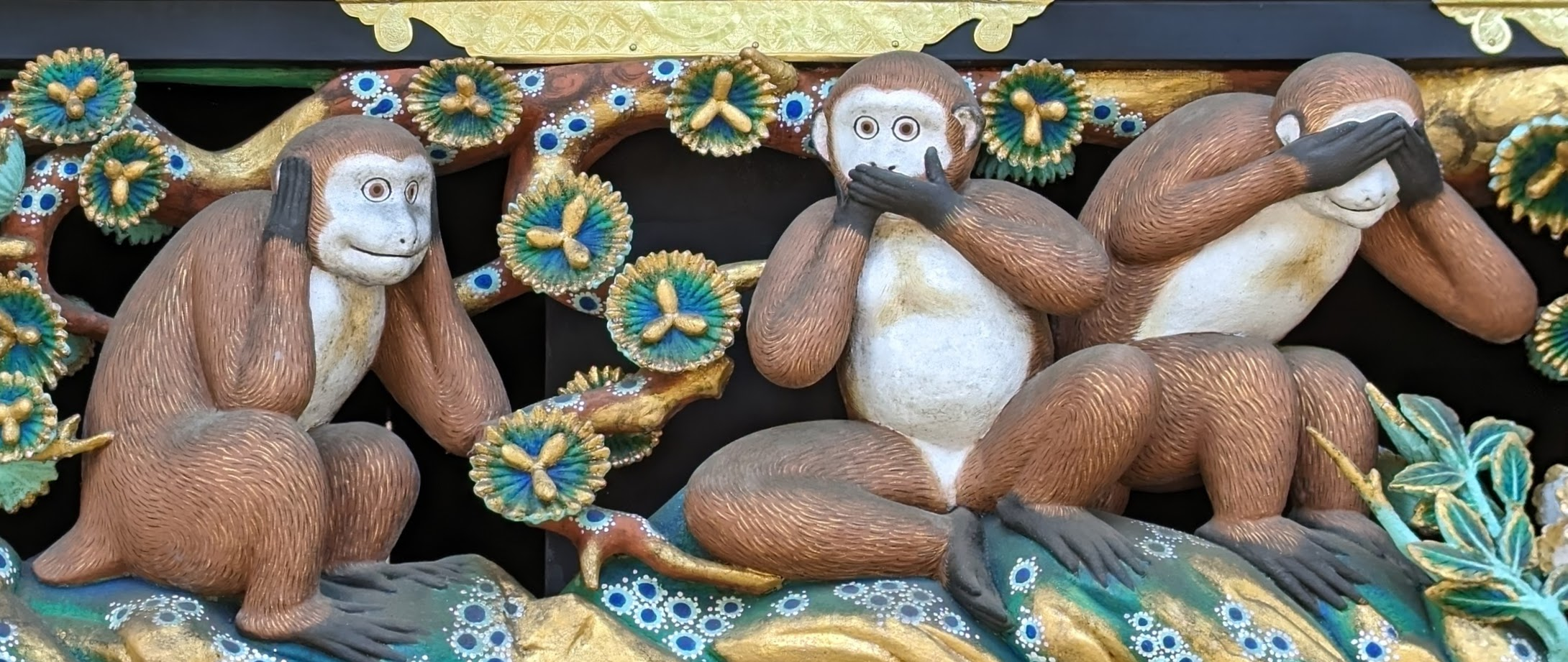
The three wise monkeys

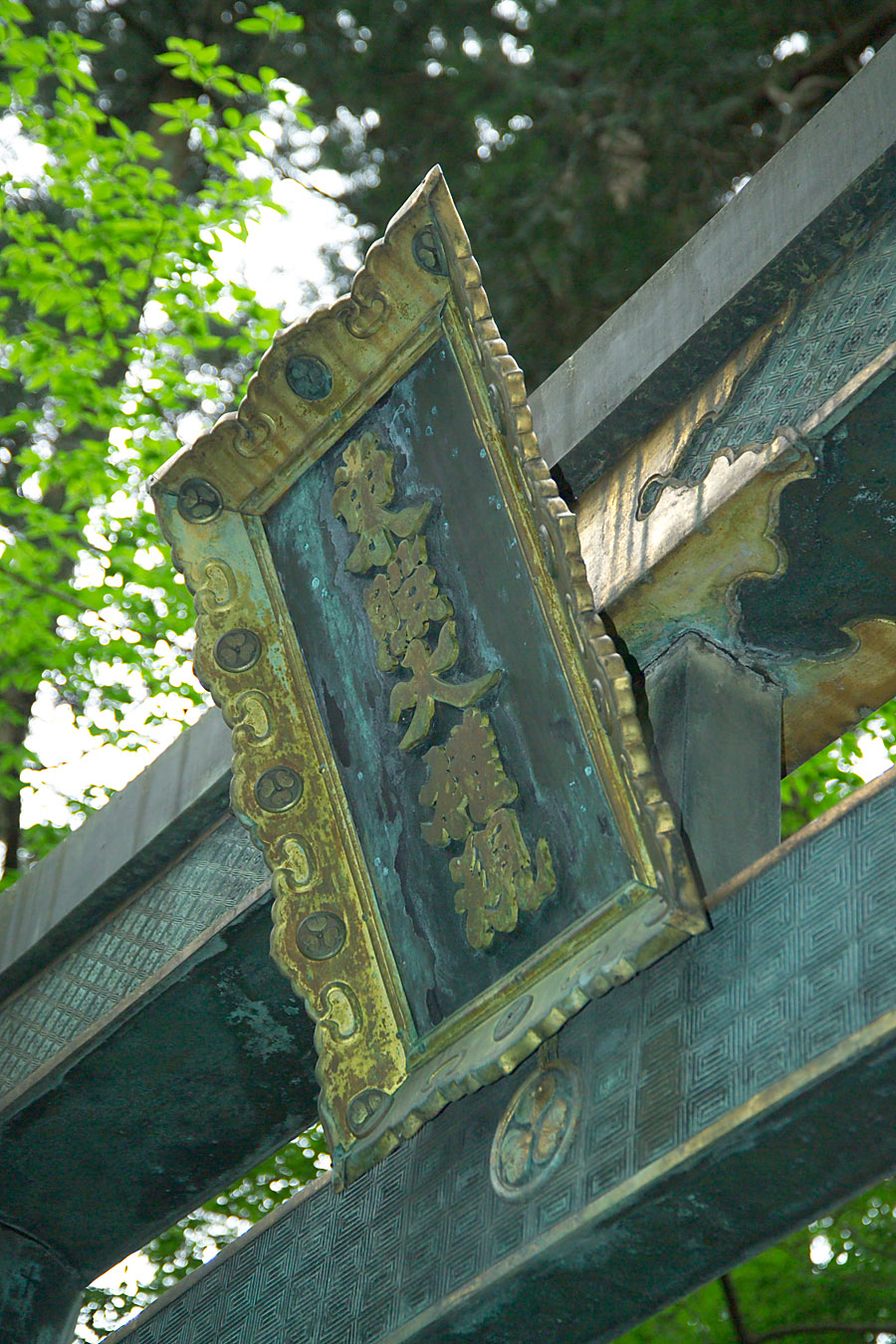
Tablet reads "Tōshō Dai-Gongen" (東照大権現) on the torii. Attributed to Emperor Go-Mizunoo

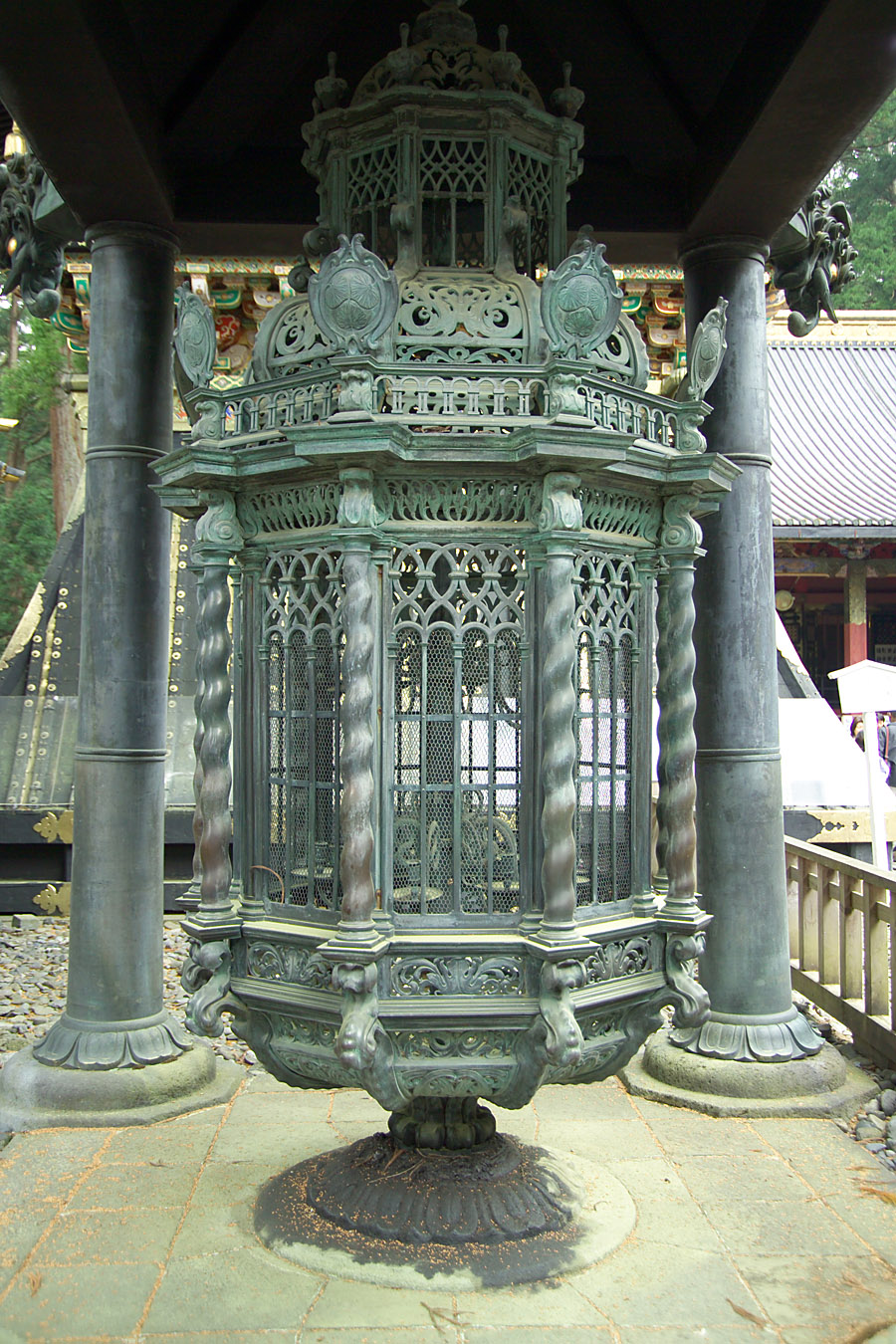
Oranda dōrō (Dutch lantern) gifted by the Dutch East India Company presented to the shōgun in 1643

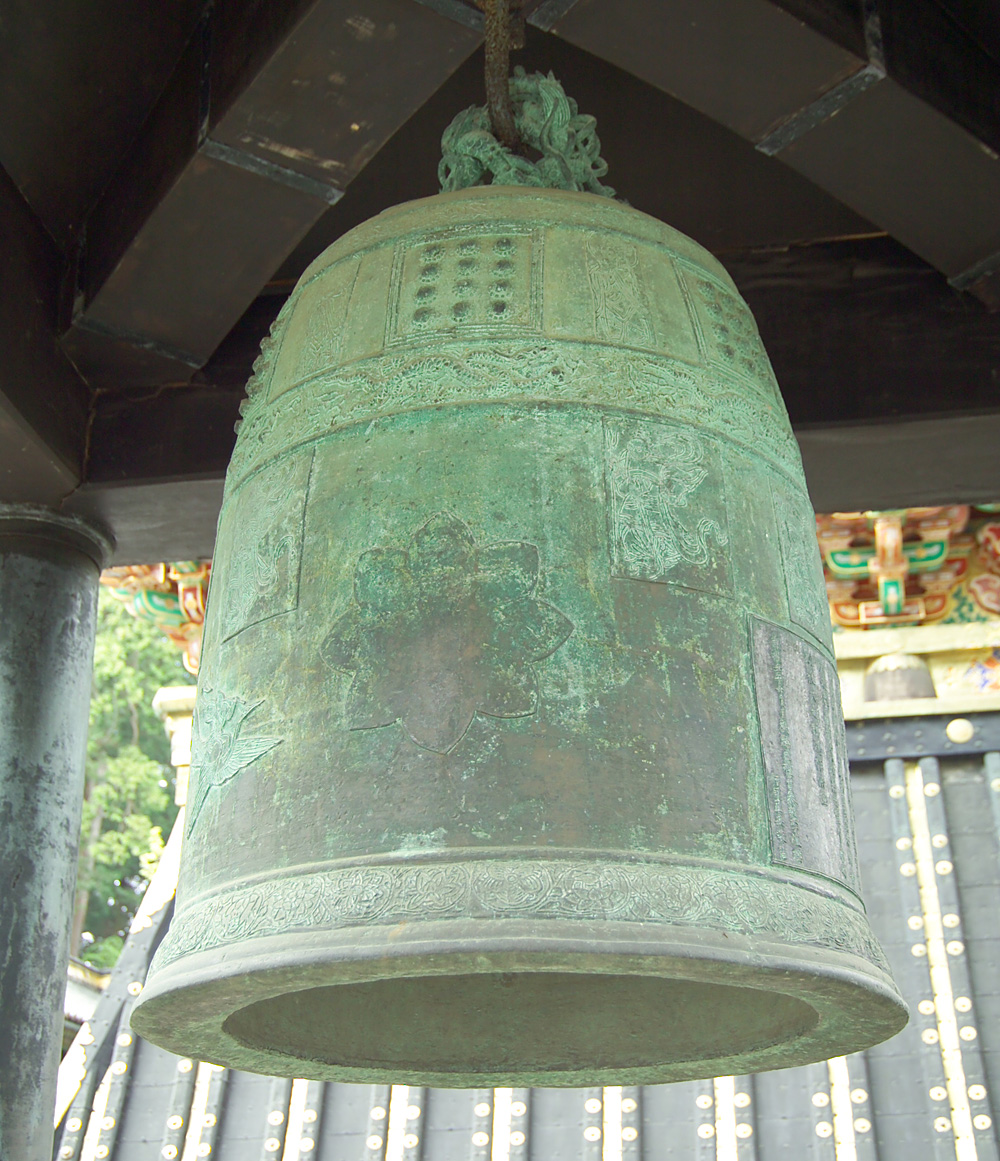
This bell gifted by the Korean Joseon dynasty

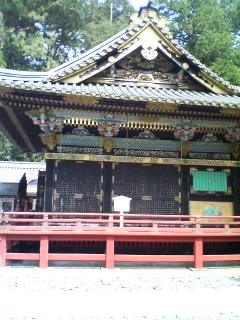
A kagura-den situated within the temple

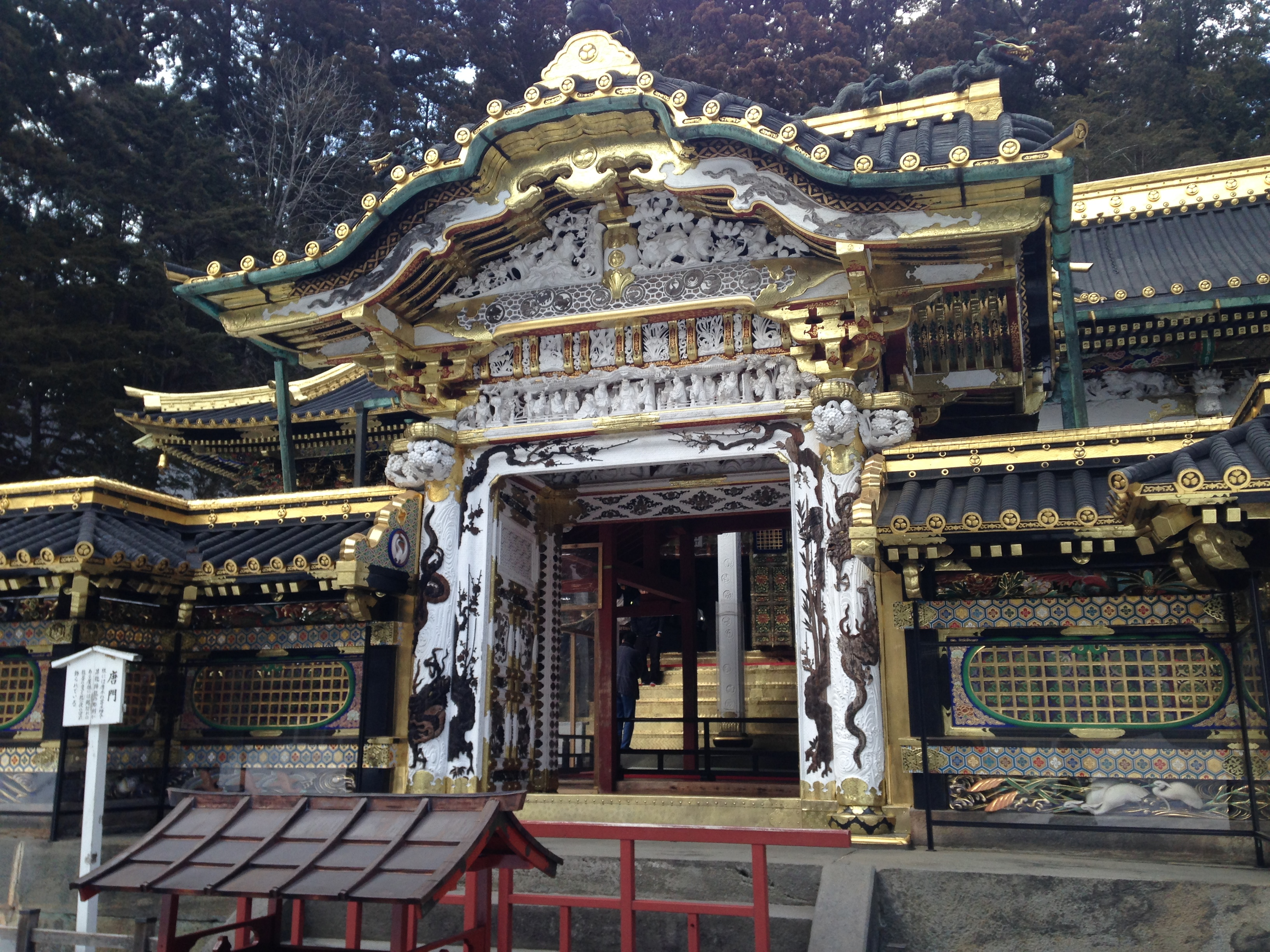
The karamon, a notable architectural element found in Japanese cultural sites, situated within the shrine

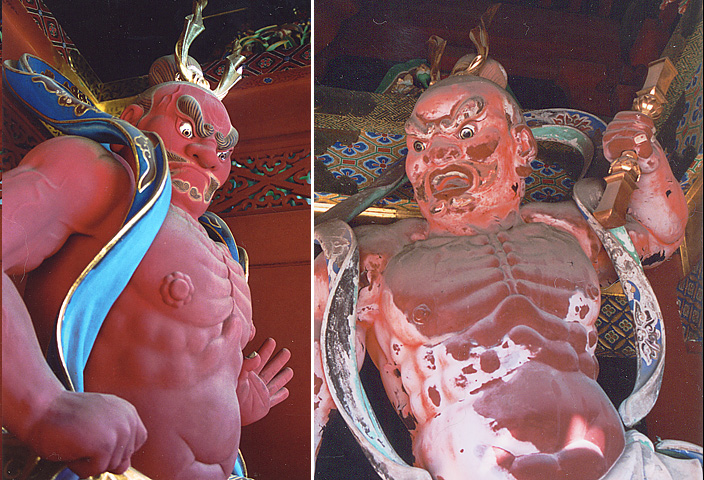
Statues of Nio guard the temple

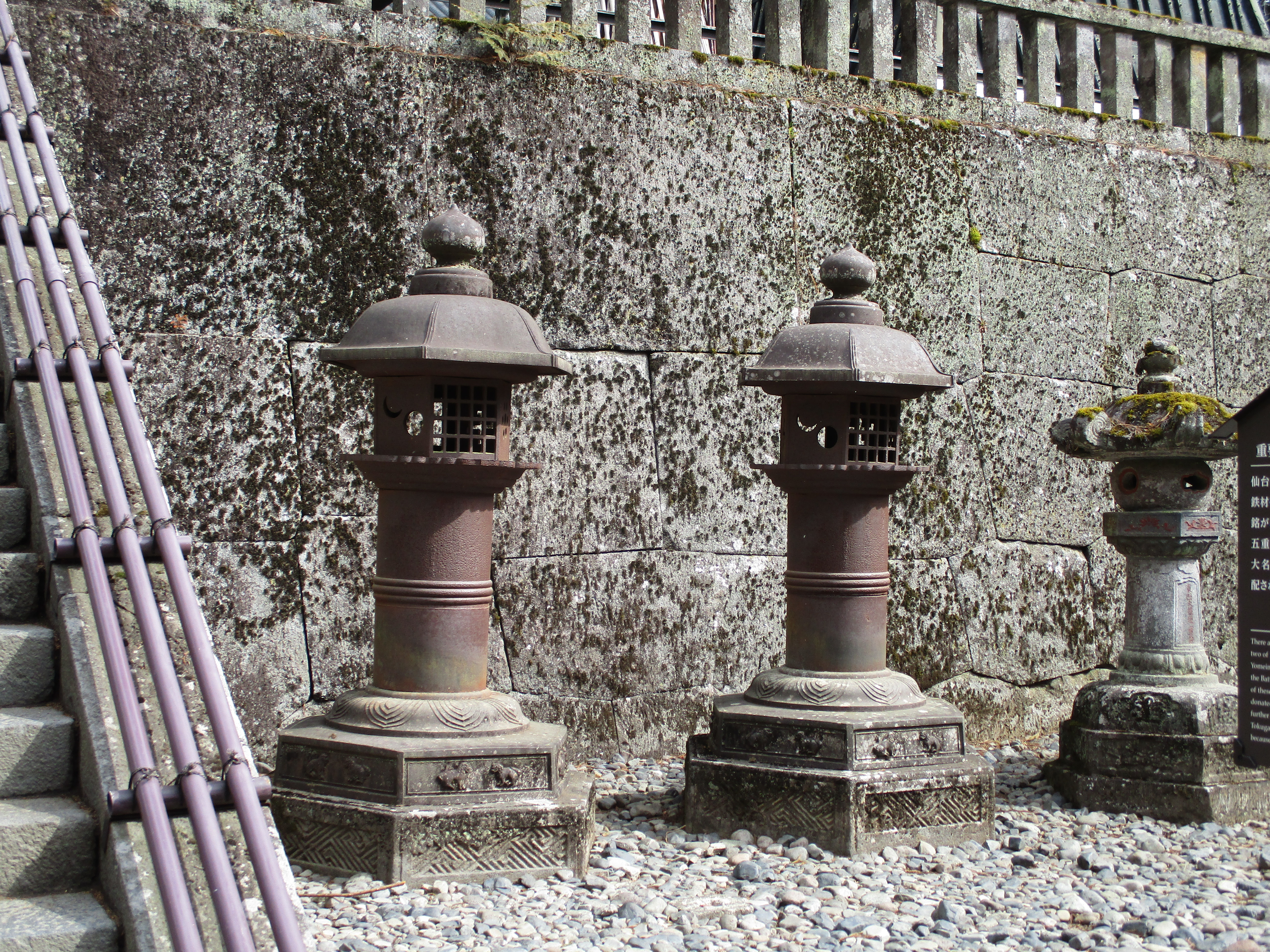
Iron lanterns donated by Daimyo Date Masamune

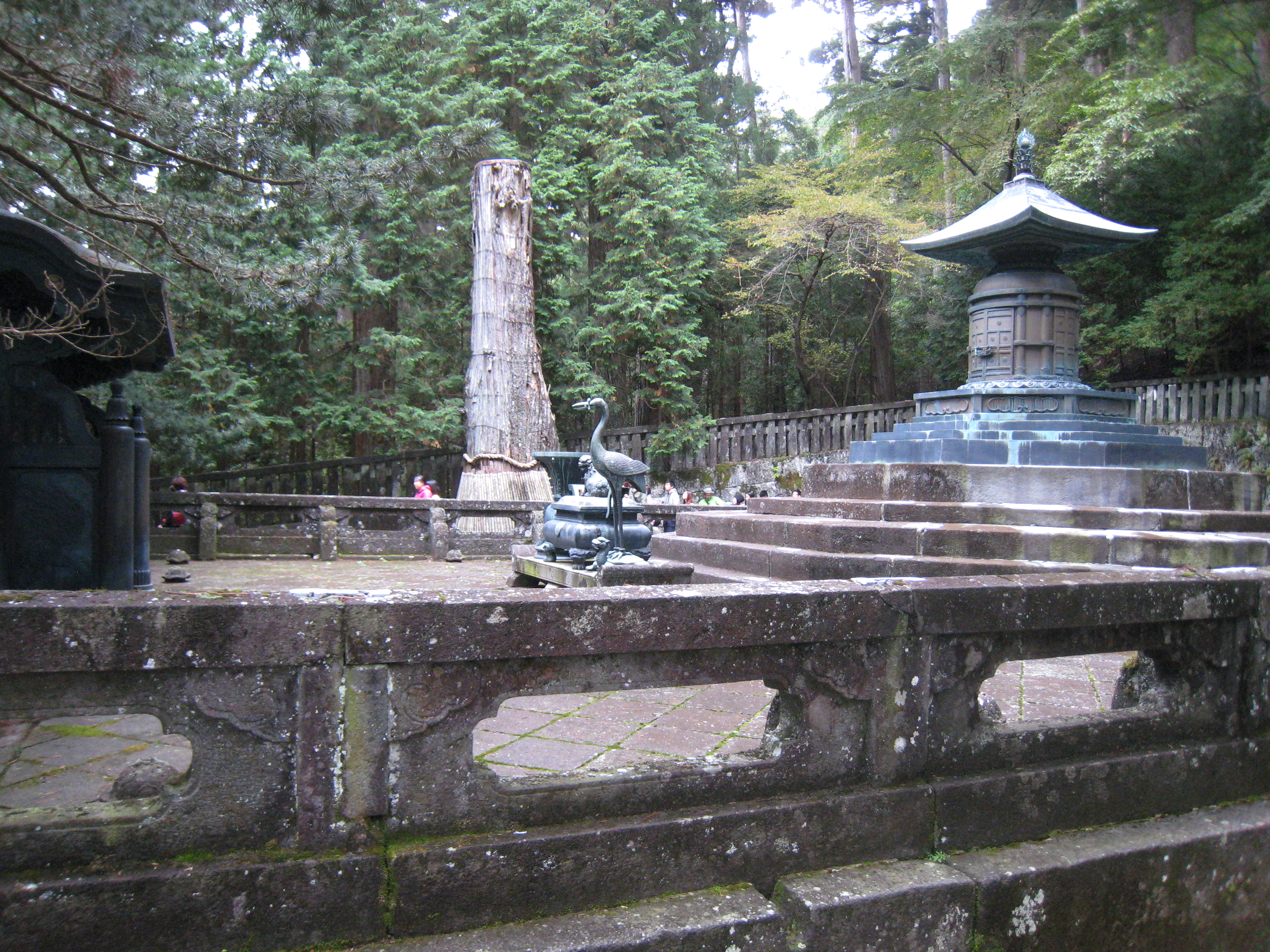
The urn (on the right) containing the remains of Tokugawa Ieyasu

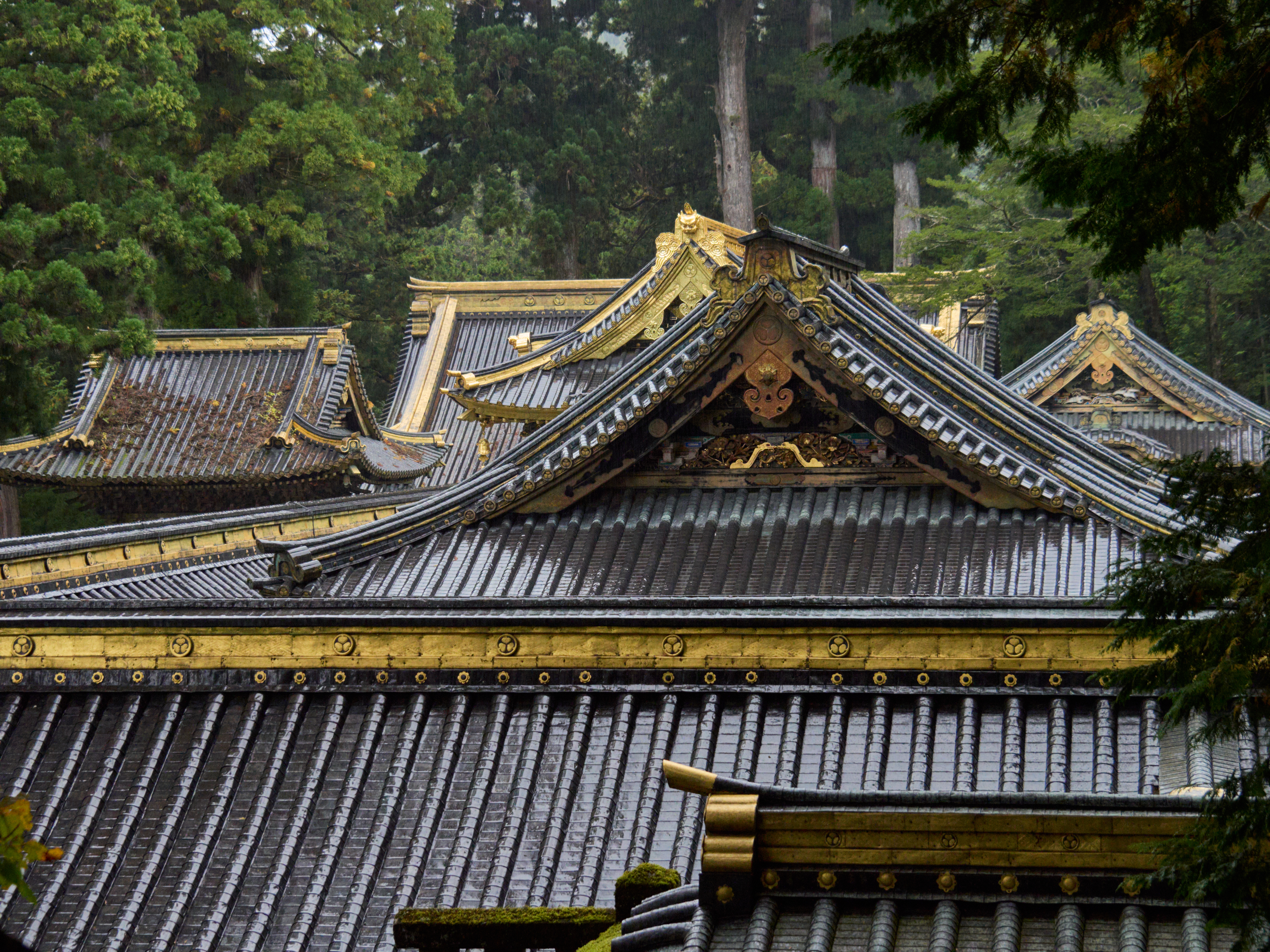
Ornate black and gold rooftops.

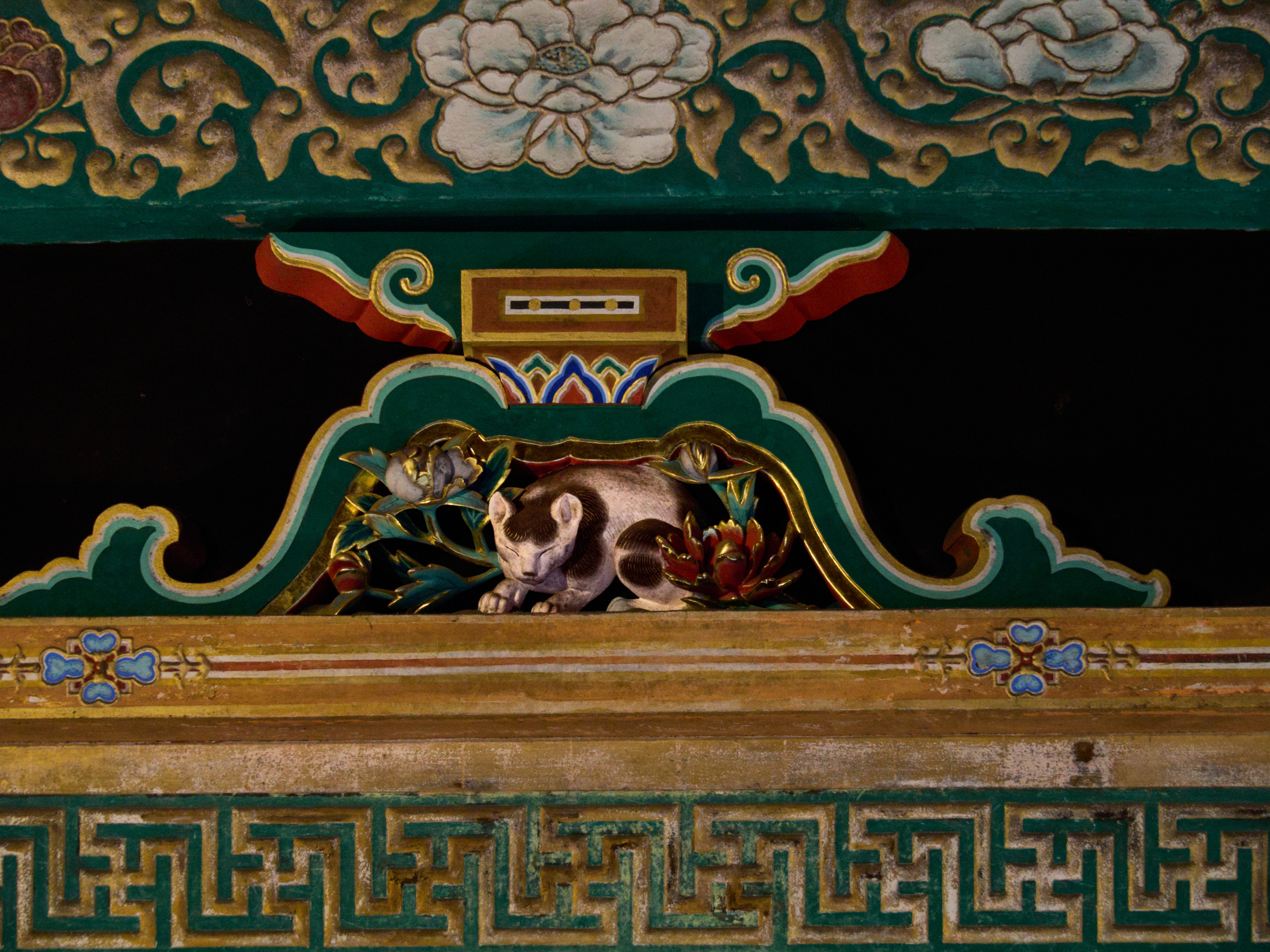
The Sleeping Cat (Nemuri-neko) carving on the lintel of Sakashitamon Gate

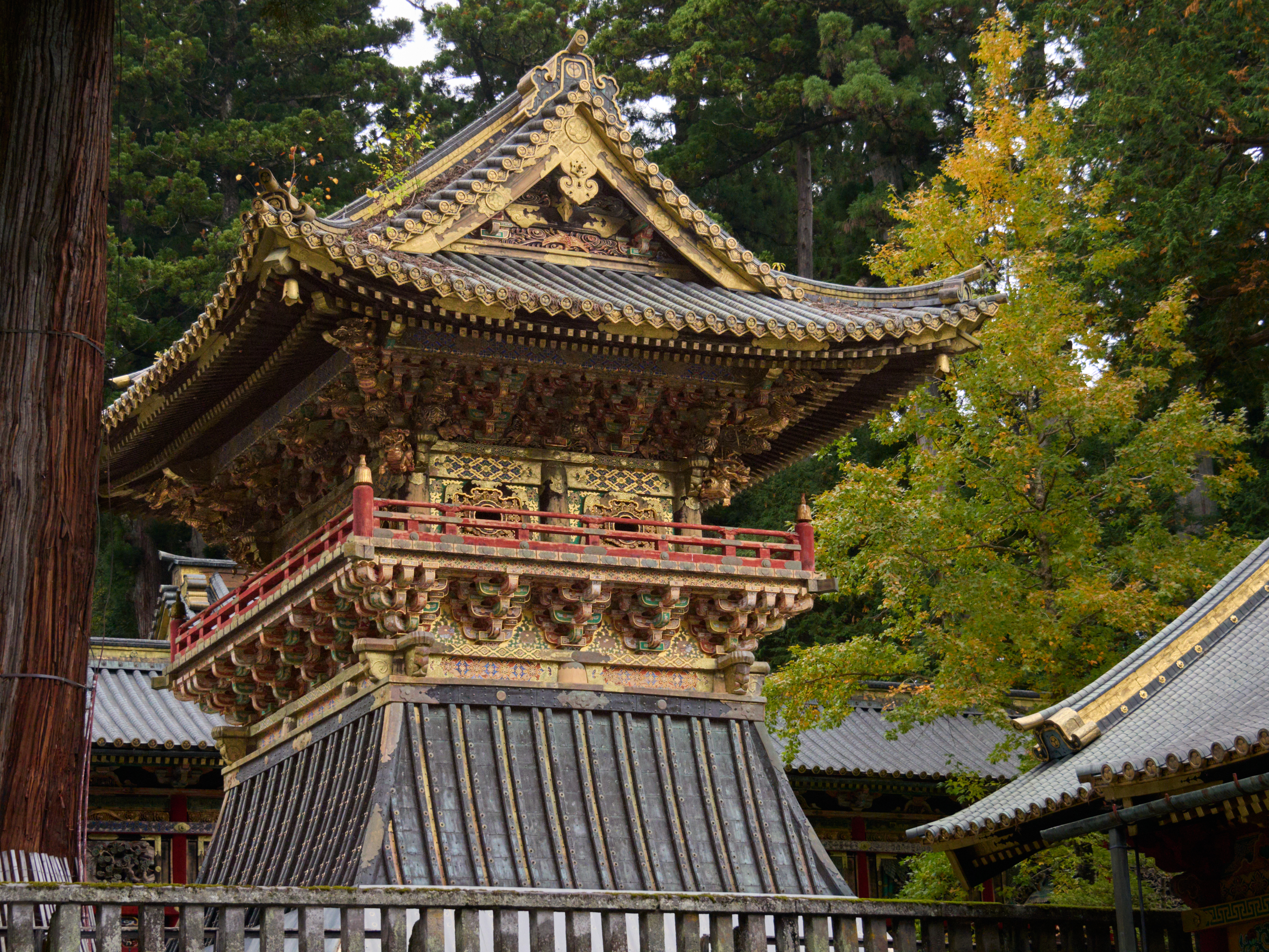
The drum tower (Koro)

== See also ==
- List of National Treasures of Japan (shrines)
- List of National Treasures of Japan (crafts-swords)
- Shinbashira, the central wooden column, almost freely suspended
