= Naka-in =

Buddhist temple in Saitama Prefecture, Japan

- 中院
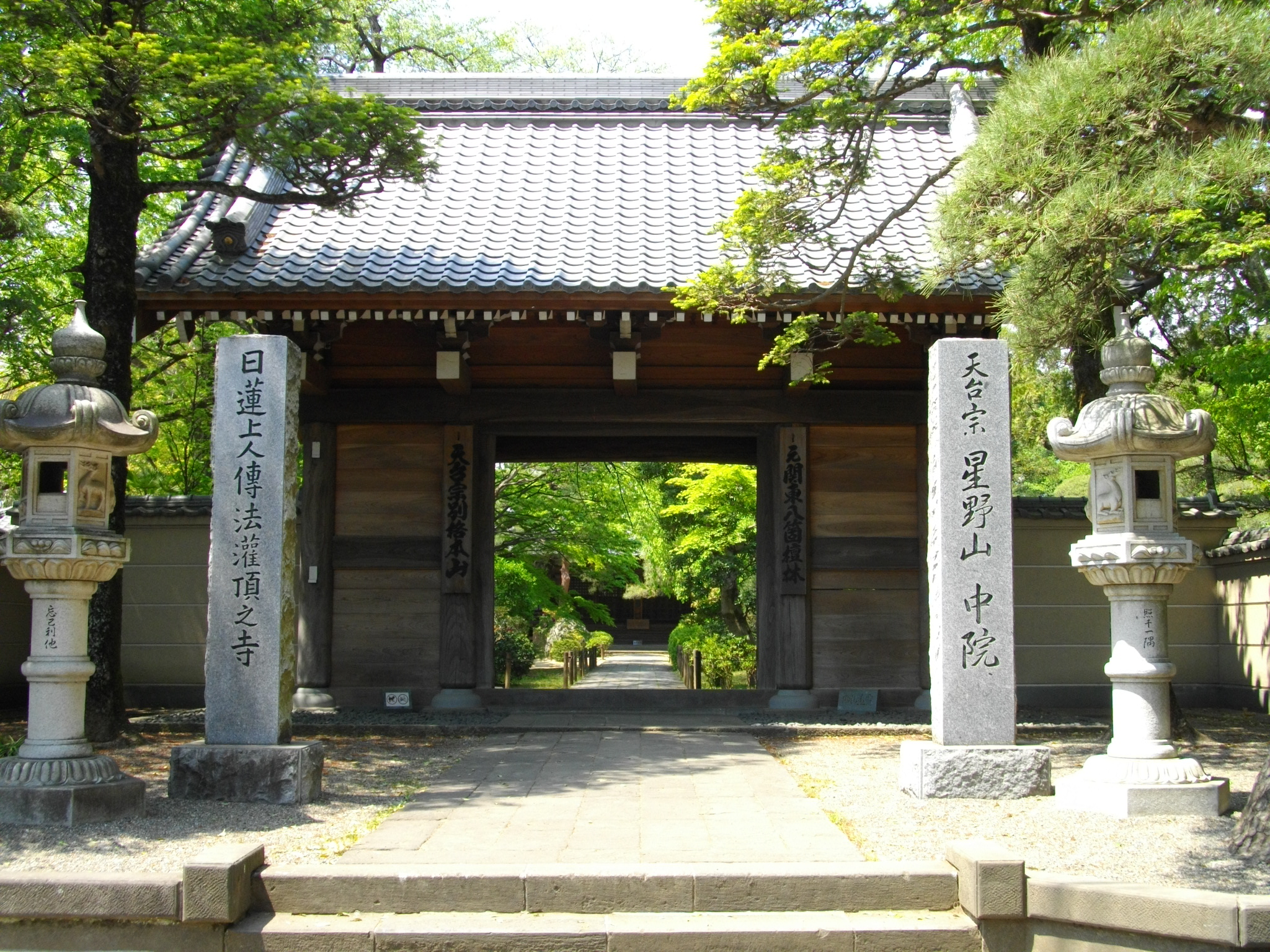

Religion
- Affiliation: Tendai
- Deity: Amida Nyorai

Location
- Location: 5-15-1 Kosenba-cho, Kawagoe, Saitama
- Country: Japan
- Interactive map of Naka-in
- Coordinates: 35°54′53.7″N 139°29′25.3″E

Architecture
- Founder: Ennin
- Completed: 830

Naka-in is a Tendai Buddhist temple in Kawagoe City, Saitama Prefecture. Sangō is Seiyasan. Jigō is Muryoju-ji. Ingō is Naka-in.

== Origins and History ==
Naka-in was founded in the Heian period under the name of Muryoju-ji Bucchi-in. Emperor Junna ordered the monk Ennin (Jikaku Daishi) for its foundation. In the Kamakura period, it was rebuilt by the monk Sonkai who gave Eshin School Denbokaigo to Nichiren, The temple flourished as the head temple of 580 temples in Kanto region. Muryoju-ji consists of Butsuzo-in (Kita-in), Bucchi-in (Naka-in) and Tamon-in (Minami-in), Emperor Gofushimi ordered the monk Sonkai to make the temple as the head temple of Tendai temples in Kanto region. In 1296, a school teaching Tendai named Senba Dangisho was founded in Naka-in, it flourished as one of the Kanto Hachi Danrin. Until the monk Tenkai became the chief priest of Kita-in, Naka-in played a key role in Muryoju-ji. When Senba Tōshō-gū was founded in 1639, Naka-in was moved to the present location.

- 830 (7th year of the Tencho Era) Ennin founded Bucchi-in (Naka-in) by order of Emperor Junna
- 941 (4th year of the Tengyo Era) Burned in the Battle of Tengyo
- 1296 (4th year of the Einin Era) Sonkai rebuilt the garan with the support from Narita
- 1296 (4th year of the Einin Era) Senba Dangisho was founded
- 1537 (6th year of the Tenbun Era) Its garan was rebuilt
- 1632 (9th of the Kan'ei Era) rebuilt the garan
- 1638 (15th of the Kan'ei Era) Burned in the Great Fire of Kawagoe
- 1639 (16th of the Kan'ei Era) Moved to the present location
- 1733 (19th of the Kyoho Era) The main hall was rebuilt
- 1945 (20th of the Showa Era) Shaka-Do and Yakushi-do were burned
- 1983 (58th of the Showa Era) Shaka-Do was rebuilt
- 2012 (24th of the Heisei Era) Yakushi-Do was rebuilt

== Cultural Assets ==
- Naka-in (historic site designated by Kawagoe City)
- Naka-in Documents (tangible cultural asset designated by Kawagoe City)

== Features ==
- Weeping cherry blossoms
- Kato Miki's grave

A grave of Miki Kato, the mother-in-low of Toson Shimazaki is located. Touson often visited there. Toson's wife, Shizuko Kato was from Kawagoe, he got along with his mother-in-low and gave her a tea room named Fusentei. Miki Kato was the master of tea ceremony. A monument named Fusen-no-hi with the inscription by Toson Shimazaki is there.

- A monument of the birthplace of Sayama Tea

Ennin introduced tea from Kyoto and started to grow tea in the compound of the temple. Later, tea plantation became popular in Sayama Hills (狭山丘陵) owned by Kawagoe Domain.The origin of Sayama tea is Kawagoe tea. Until 1990s, some tea plantations remained in the compound of the temple.

- A monument of Nichiren's Denbokanjo

A monument to commemorate that Nichiren took Eshin School Denbokanjo from the monk Sonkai in 1253 (5th of the Kencho Era).
