= List of Tōshō-gū =

A Tōshō-gū (東照宮) is any Shinto shrine in which Tokugawa Ieyasu is enshrined with the name Tōshō Daigongen (東照大権現). This list may never be complete given the widespread veneration of Tōshō Daigongen.

- Dewa Sanzan Tōshō-gū 出羽三山神社
- Hamamatsu Tōshō-gū 浜松東照宮
- Hanazono Shrine 花園神社
- Hida Tōshō-gū 飛騨東照宮
- Hirosaki Tōshō-gū 弘前東照宮
- Hiroshima Tōshō-gū 広島東照宮
- Hiyoshi Tōshō-gū 日吉東照宮
- Hokkaidō Tōshō-gū 北海道東照宮
- Hōraisan Tōshō-gū 鳳来山東照宮
- Iga Tōshō-gū 伊賀東照宮
- Kishū Tōshō-gū (also Wakayama Tōshō-gū)
- Kunōzan Tōshō-gū 久能山東照宮
- Matsudaira Tōshō-gū 松平東照宮
- Matsue Jinja 松江神社
- Mito Tōshō-gū 水戸東照宮
- Maebashi Tōshō-gū 前橋東照宮
- Nagoya Tōshō-gū 名古屋東照宮
- Nikkō Tōshō-gū 日光東照宮
- Ōchidani Jinja 樗谿神社
- Oshi Tōshō-gū 忍東照宮
- Reikyū Jinja 霊丘神社
- Sendai Tōshō-gū 仙台東照宮
- Serada Tōshō-gū 世良田東照宮
- Shiba Tōshō-gū 芝東照宮
- Tatsuo Jinja 龍尾神社
- Tokugawa Tōshō-gū 徳川東照宮
- Ueno Tōshō-gū 上野東照宮
- Yashima Jinja 屋島神社
- Yōkaichiba Tōshō-gū 八日市場東照宮

Three of the shrines are enumerated as the Three Great Tōshō-gū Shrines (日本三大東照宮):

- Hōraisan Tōshō-gū 鳳来山東照宮
- Senba Tōshō-gū 仙波東照宮
- Takisan Tōshō-gū 滝山東照宮

== See also ==
- List of Jingū
