= Hiyoshi Tōshō-gū =

Shrine Otsu, Shiga Prefecture, Japan

Coordinates: 35°04′06″N 135°51′52″E

Hiyoshi Tōshō-gū (日吉東照宮) is a Shinto shrine in Ōtsu, Shiga Prefecture, Japan. It enshrines the first Shōgun of the Tokugawa Shogunate, Tokugawa Ieyasu. It was established in 1623. The shrine's annual festival is held on June 1.

It used to be affiliated as a Setsumatsusha with Enryaku-ji but now it is considered a branch shrine of Hiyoshi Taisha.

== See also ==
- Tōshō-gū
- List of Tōshō-gū
