= Motoshirochō Tōshō-gū =

Hamamatsu Tōshō-gū 浜松東照宮
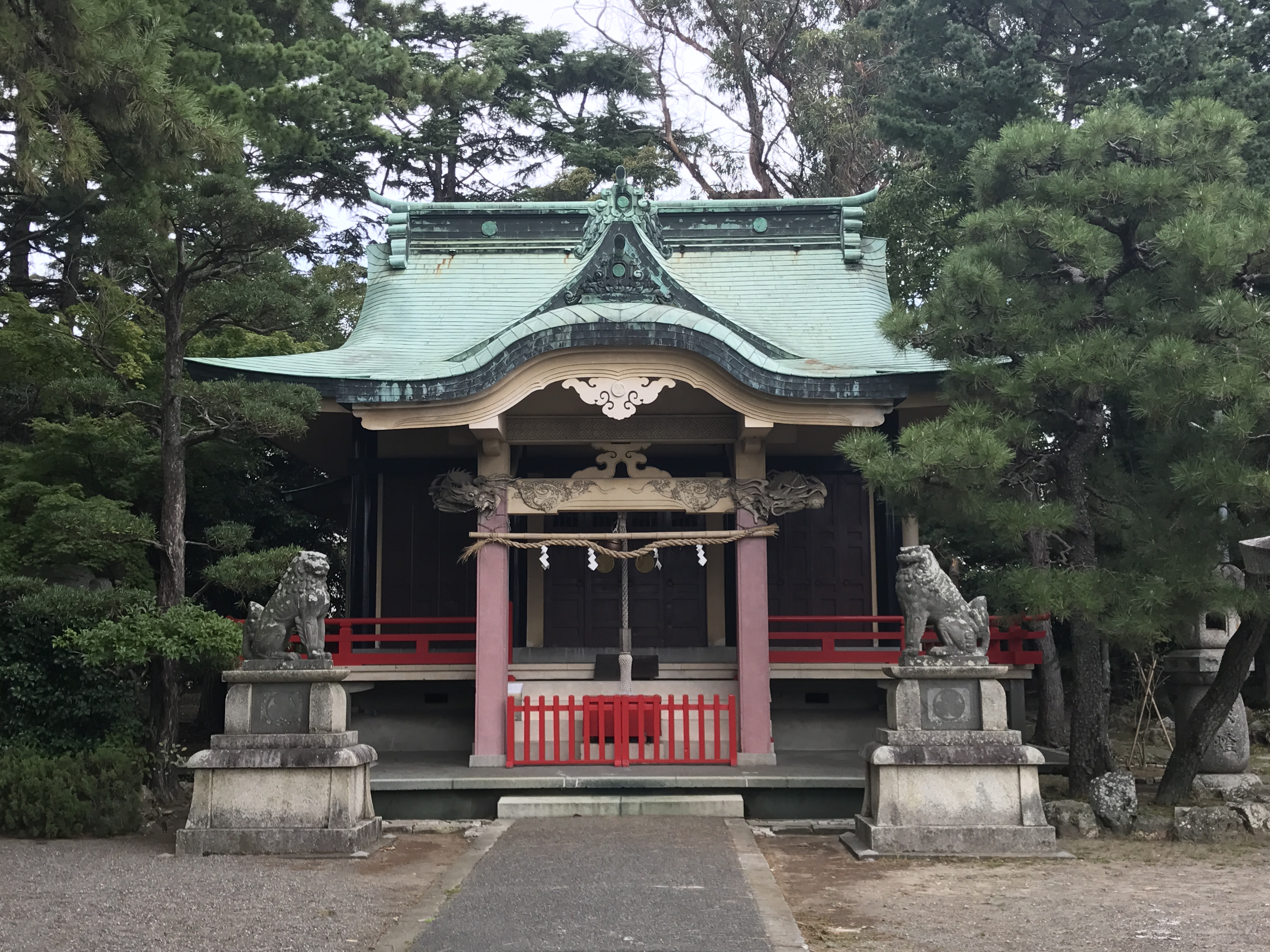
- Hamamatsu Tōshō-gū

- Hamamatsu Tōshō-gū Motoshirochō Tōshō-gū (Japan)

Religion
- Affiliation: Shinto
- Deity: Tokugawa Ieyasu
- Festival: October 10
- Type: Tōshō-gū

Location
- Location: Chūō-ku, Hamamatsu, Shizuoka Prefecture, Japan
- Interactive map of Hamamatsu Tōshō-gū 浜松東照宮
- Coordinates: 34.713142°N 137.728486°E

Architecture
- Established: 1887

Motoshirochō Tōshō-gū (元城町東照宮, Motoshirochō Tōshō-gū) is a Shinto shrine in Chūō-ku, Hamamatsu, Shizuoka Prefecture, Japan. It was established in 1886, and its main festival is held annually on October 10. It is also sometimes known as the Hamamatsu Tōshō-gū (浜松東照宮, Hamamatsu Tōshō-gū)

== History ==
Motoshirochō Tōshō-gū is one of many shrines in all locations in Japan dedicated to the deified spirit of Tokugawa Ieyasu, the founder of the Tokugawa shogunate, which ruled Japan during the Edo period from 1601 to 1868. The site of the shrine has especially strong connections to Tokugawa Ieyasu, as he lived at Hikuma Castle, where the shrine was built, for 17 years, from age 29 to 45. Hamamatsu Castle, which was ruled by a succession of fudai daimyō under Hamamatsu Domain was built overlapping the ruins of Hikuma Castle. Following the Meiji restoration. the castle was pulled down, and much of its area was subsequently absorbed by the growing urbanization of the modern city of Hamamatsu.

Ii Hachirō (1816-1897), the former castellan of Hamamatsu Castle, petitioned the Meiji government for permission to build a shrine of the site of Tokugawa Ieyasu's residence in Hikoma Castle in 1877. Permission was granted, but no funding. As raising the funds to build the shrine took a long time, it was not until 1887 that a temporary shrine was built on the grounds of the adjacent Dai Nippon Hotokusha, a public foundation dedicated to propagating the teachings of Ninomiya Sontoku. The shrine at Motoshirochō was not completed until 1936.

However, during the Bombing of Hamamatsu in World War II, the shrine burned down. The present structure dates from 1958.

== See also ==
- Tōshō-gū
- List of Tōshō-gū
