= Yōkaichiba Tōshō-gū =

Shinto shrines in Chiba Prefecture, Japan

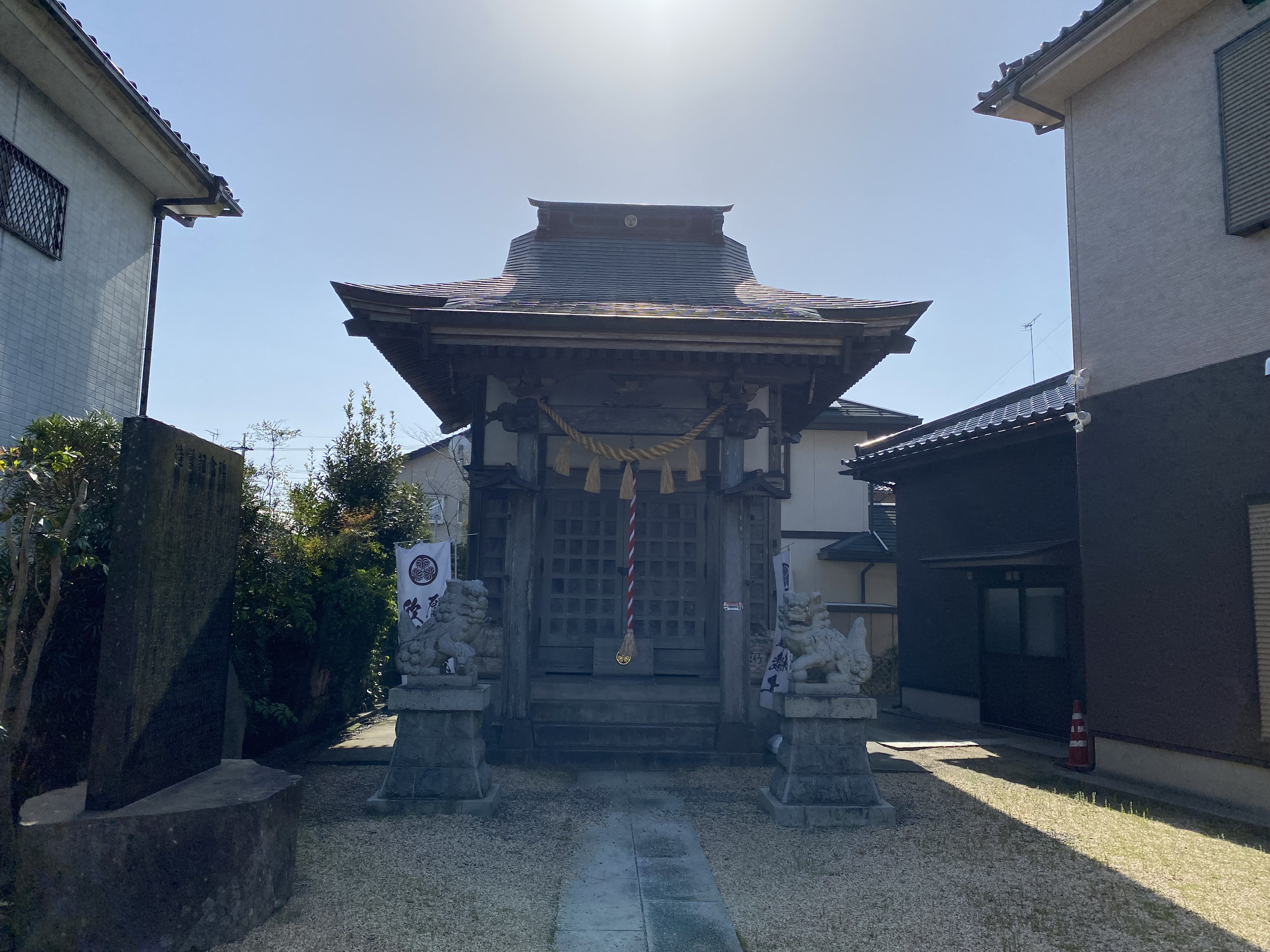

Yōkaichiba Tōshō-gū (八日市場東照宮) is a Shinto shrine in Sōsa, Chiba Prefecture, Japan. It enshrines the first Shōgun of the Tokugawa Shogunate, Tokugawa Ieyasu.

== See also ==
- Tōshō-gū
- List of Tōshō-gū
