= Takisan Tōshō-gū =

Shinto shrine in Okazaki, Japan

Takisan Tōshō-gū 滝山東照宮
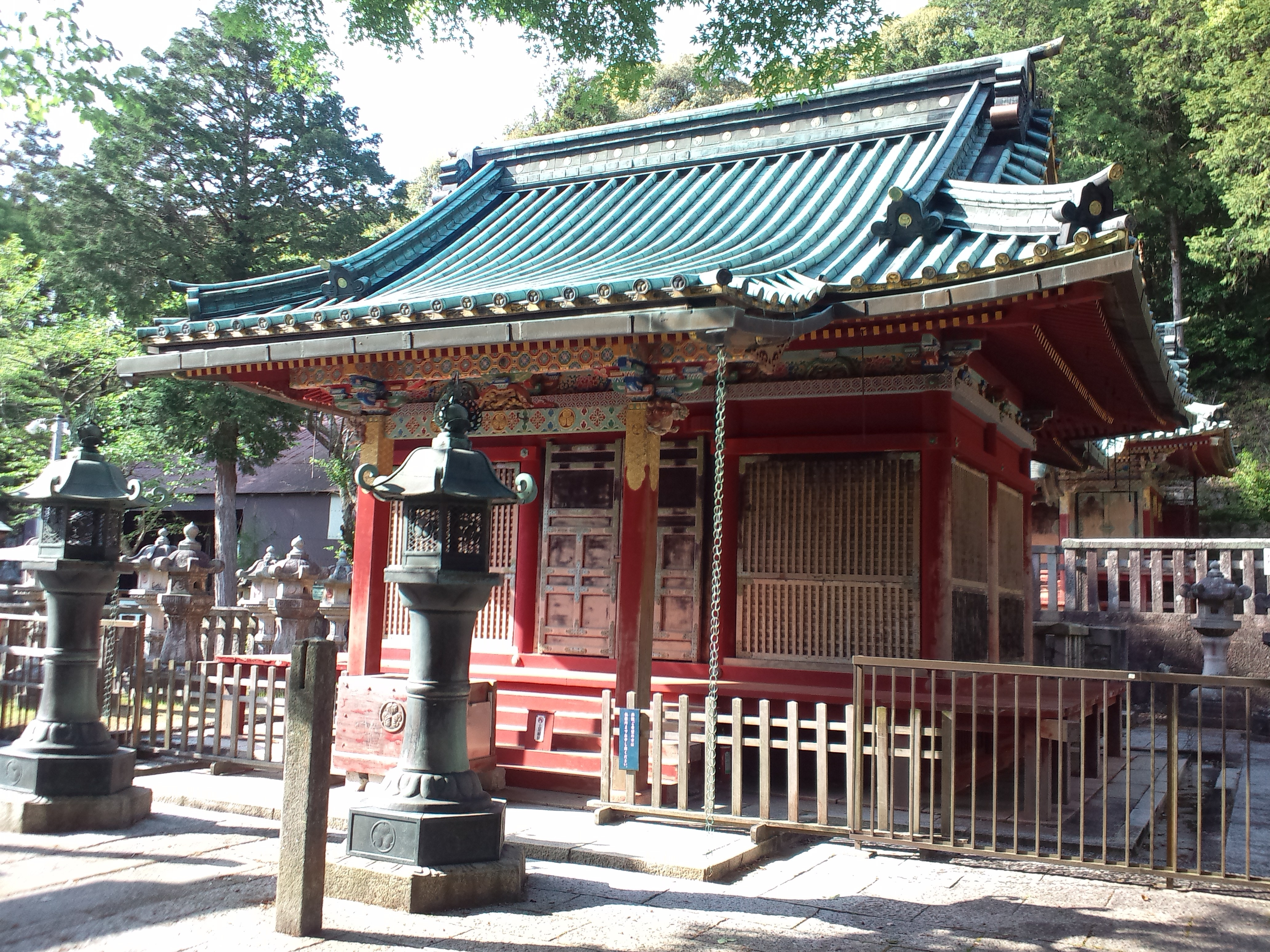
- Haiden of Takisan Tōshō-gū

- Location within Aichi Prefecture Location within Japan

Religion
- Affiliation: Shinto
- Deity: Tokugawa Ieyasu
- Type: Tōshō-gū

Location
- Location: Okazaki, Aichi, Japan
- Interactive map of Takisan Tōshō-gū 滝山東照宮
- Coordinates: 34°59′18″N 137°12′22″E

Architecture
- Founder: Tokugawa Iemitsu
- Established: 1646

Website
- Official website

Takisan Tōshō-gū (滝山東照宮) is a Shinto shrine in Okazaki, Aichi Prefecture, Japan. It enshrines the first Shōgun of the Tokugawa Shogunate, Tokugawa Ieyasu.

== History ==
In 1644, Shōgun Tokugawa Iemitsu ordered the construction of a shrine dedicated to his deified grandfather, Tokugawa Ieyasu, near the location of his birthplace at Okazaki Castle. Sakai Tadakatsu and Matsudaira Masatsuna were assigned the task, which was completed on September 17, 1646. In 1917, it was merged with a nearby Hakusan and a Hiyoshi Jinja and was renamed "Tokiwa Jinja" (常磐神社). It received the rank of a village shrine (村社) under the State Shinto system's Modern system of ranked Shinto shrines.

In 1953, the Honden, Heiden, Torii, Middle Gate and Ablution font of the shrine were designated Important Cultural Properties. The shrine also possesses two tachi Japanese swords which are designated as Important Cultural Properties. One was a donation by Tokugawa Iemitsu and the other by Tokugawa Ietsuna.

In 1954, the shrine was renamed Takisan Tōshō-gū.

The shrine is approximately a 15-minute walk from Higashi Okazaki Station.

== See also ==
- Tōshō-gū
- List of Tōshō-gū
