= Hirosaki Tōshō-gū =

Shinto shrine in Aomori Prefecture, Japan

Hirosaki Tōshō-gū (弘前東照宮)
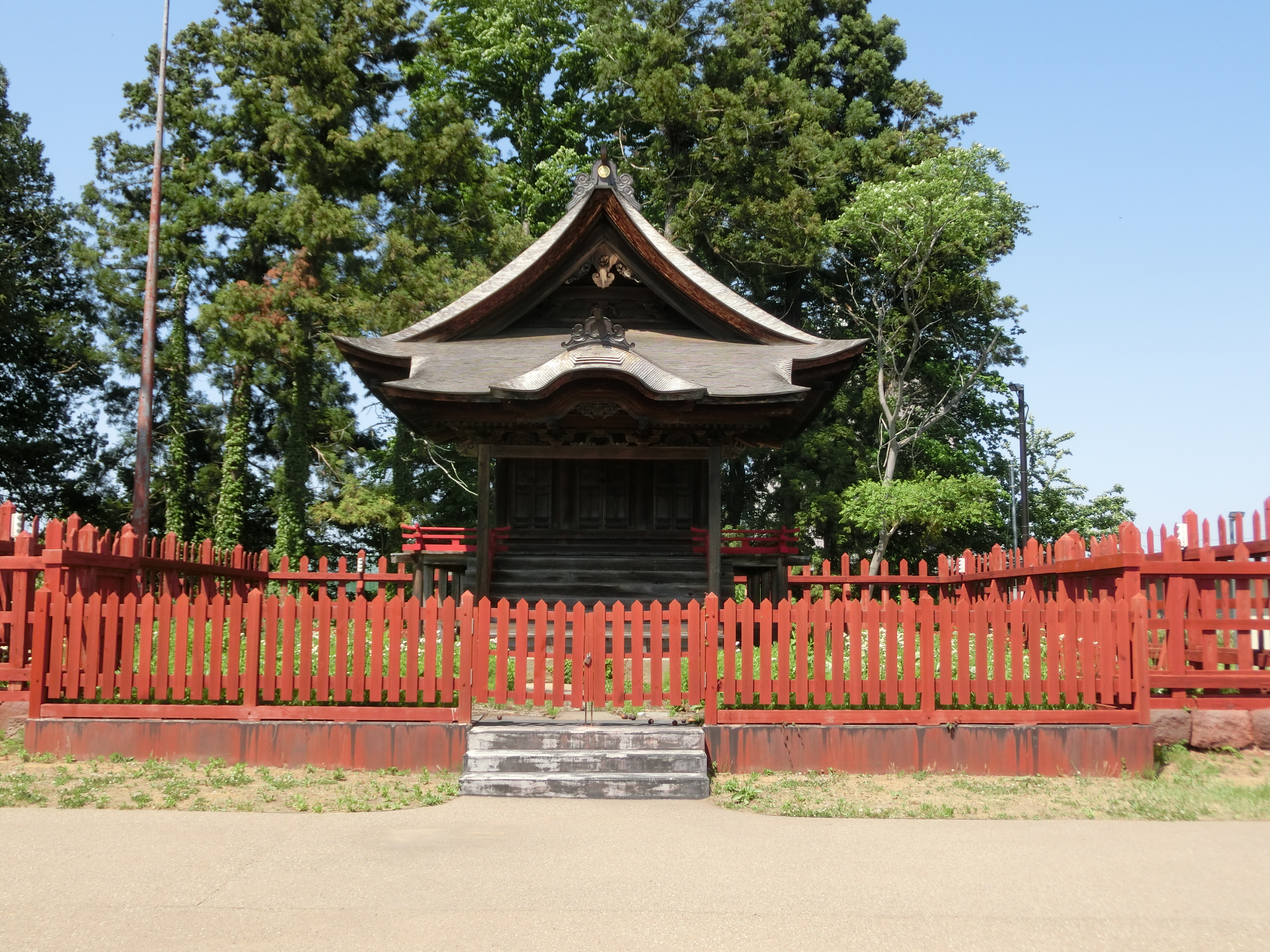
- Main hall of Hirosaki Tōshō-gū

- Location within Aomori Prefecture Location within Japan

Religion
- Affiliation: Shinto
- Deity: Tokugawa Ieyasu
- Type: Tōshō-gū

Location
- Location: Hirosaki, Aomori, Japan
- Coordinates: 40°36′29.1″N 140°28′28.2″E

Architecture
- Founder: Tsugaru Nobumasa
- Established: 1617

Hirosaki Tōshō-gū (弘前東照宮) was a Shinto shrine located in Hirosaki, Aomori Prefecture, Japan.

== History ==
The Hirosaki Tōshō-gū was founded by the 2nd daimyō of Hirosaki Domain, Tsugaru Nobumasa, to worship the deified Tokugawa Ieyasu in 1617. It was the first Tōshō-gū to be established by a daimyō not of the Tokugawa clan. Permission to build the shrine was granted as Tsugaru Nobumasa's official wife, Manten-hime, was an adopted daughter of Tokugawa Ieyasu. In 1624, the shrine was relocated to its present site, and in 1628, the present Honden was constructed. During the Edo period, due to the Shinbutsu-shūgō system, it was regarded as a Tendai sect Buddhist temple and had several subsidiary chapels and estates for its upkeep. However, with the end of the Tokugawa shogunate and the separation of Buddhism from Shinto it was almost destroyed. It was revived in 1872 by efforts of local inhabitants, and in 1881 was classed as a Prefectural Shrine under the Modern system of ranked Shinto shrines.

In 1953, the Irimoya-style Honden was protected by the government as an Important Cultural Property.

In the early 2000s, the shrine faced severe economic difficulties due to the expansion of a wedding chapel and by 2007 was forced to cease operations and declare bankruptcy. In 2012, the Aomori District Court ordered that all of the properties of the shrine be auctioned off. In 2015, the kami of the shrine was transferred to the Kuroishi Jinja in neighboring Kuroishi, Aomori.

== See also ==
- List of Tōshō-gū
