= Matsudaira Tōshō-gū =

Shinto shrine in Aichi Prefecture, Japan

Matsudaira Tōshō-gū (松平東照宮)
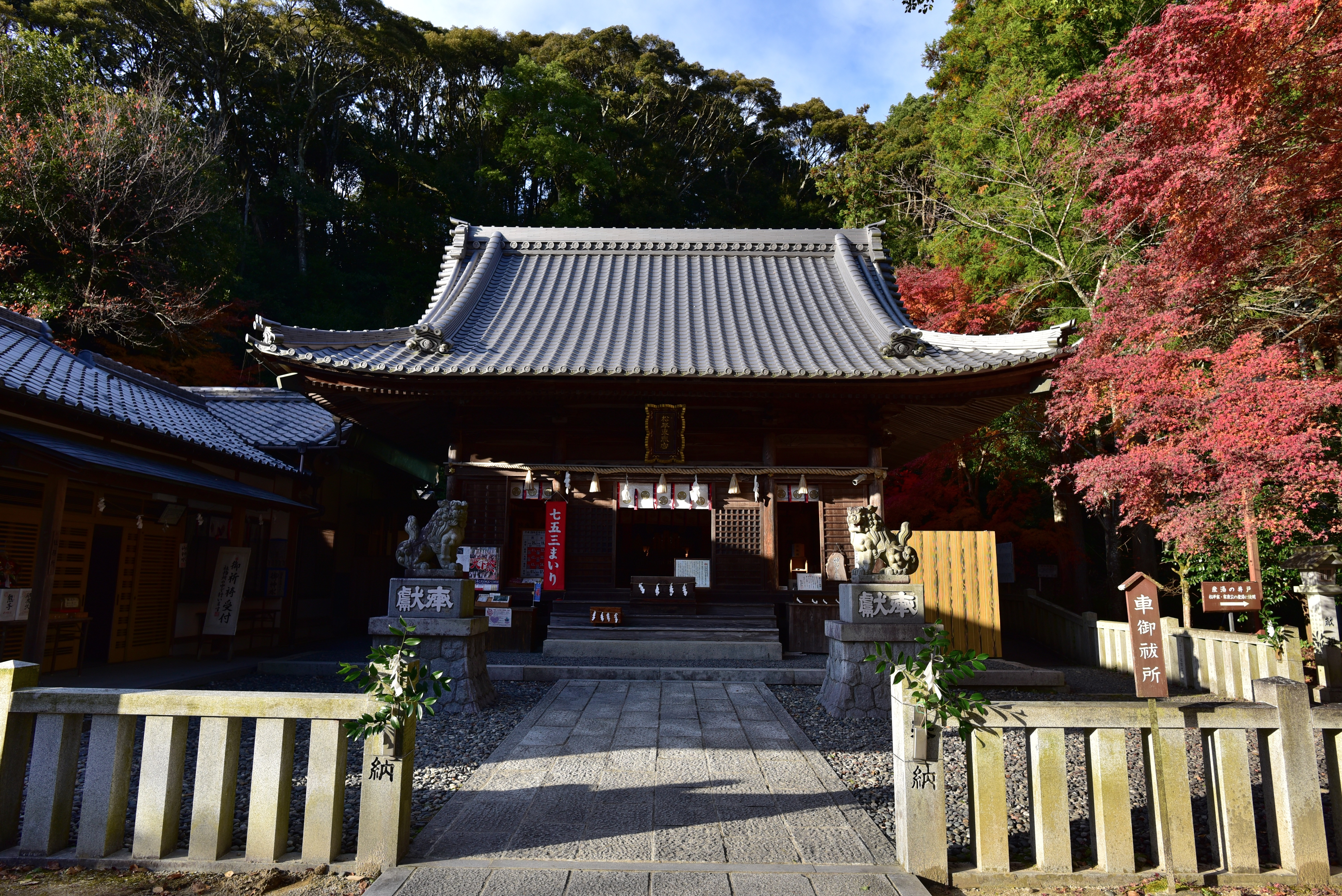
- Matsudaira Tōshō-gū

- Location within Aichi Prefecture Location within Japan

Religion
- Affiliation: Shinto
- Deity: Shōgun of the Tokugawa Shogunate, Tokugawa Ieyasu
- Type: Tōshō-gū

Location
- Location: Toyota, Aichi Prefecture, Japan
- Interactive map of Matsudaira Tōshō-gū (松平東照宮)
- Coordinates: 35.0506°N 137.2606°E

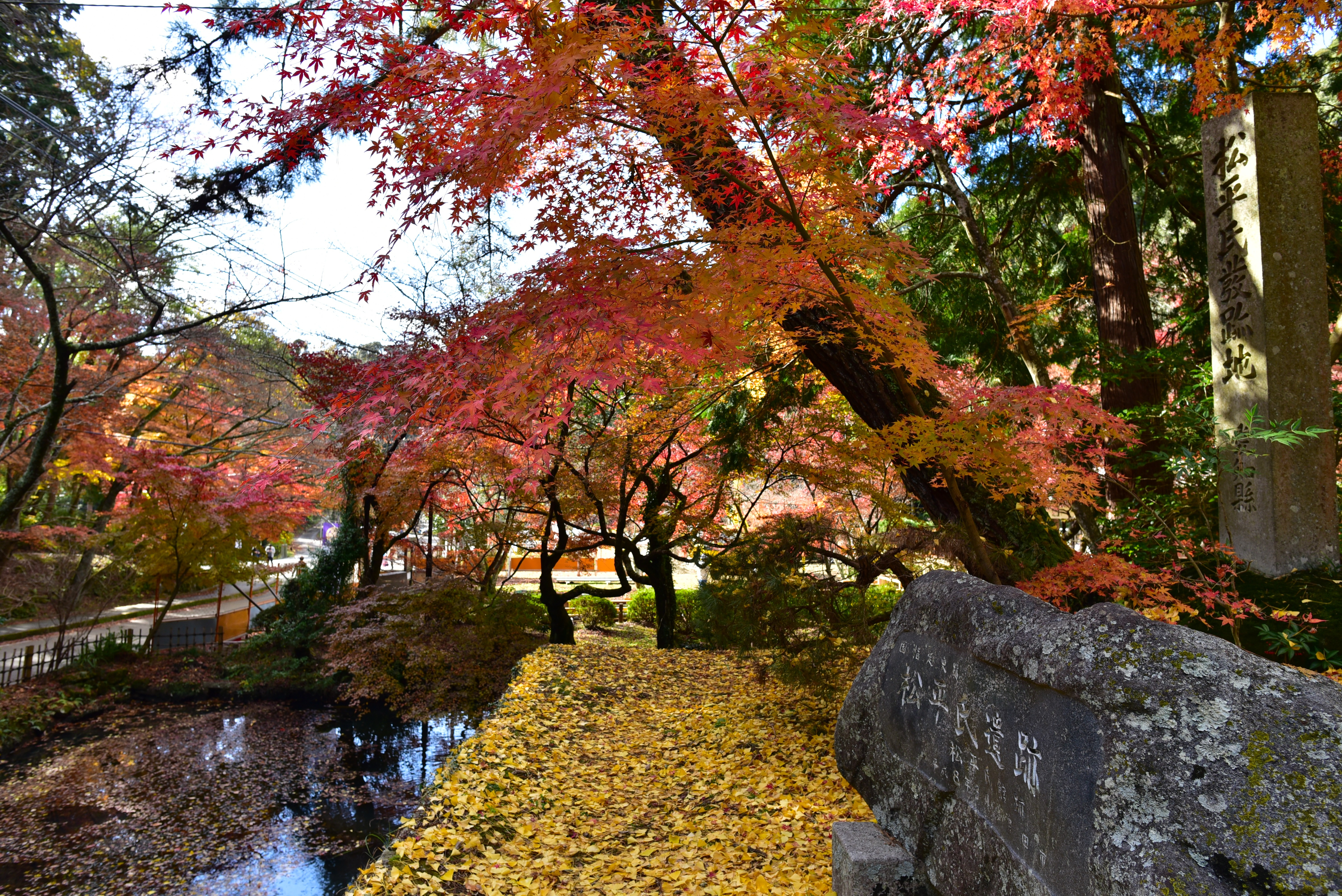
The ruins of Matsudaira

Matsudaira Tōshō-gū (松平東照宮) is a Shinto shrine in Toyota, Aichi Prefecture, Japan. It enshrines the first Shōgun of the Tokugawa Shogunate, Tokugawa Ieyasu.

== History ==
The descendants of Matsudaira Chikauji (d. 1393), the progenitor of the Matsudaira clan, continued to live in Matsudaira village in what is now the city of Toyota until modern times. In 1619, Matsudaira Naoyoshi, a clan hatamoto and the 9th generation descendant of Chikauji, enshrined the kami of the recently deified Tokugawa Ieyasu into a local Hachiman shrine, transforming it into a Tōshō-gū. The shrine is located on a side which claimed to be the location of a well where Ieyasu was bathed as an infant. Archaeological investigations have found the stone foundations of a Sengoku period fortified residence on this location, confirming that it is the site of the Matsudaira no yakata (松平氏館), or Sengoku period home of the Matsudaira clan. The site was collectively designated a National Historic Site of Japan in the year 2000, together with 3 other locations relevant to the early history of the Matsudaira clan.

== See also ==
- Tōshō-gū
- List of Tōshō-gū
- List of Historic Sites of Japan (Aichi)
