= Hida Tōshō-gū =

Shinto shrine in Gifu Prefecture, Japan

Hida Tōshō-gū 飛騨東照宮
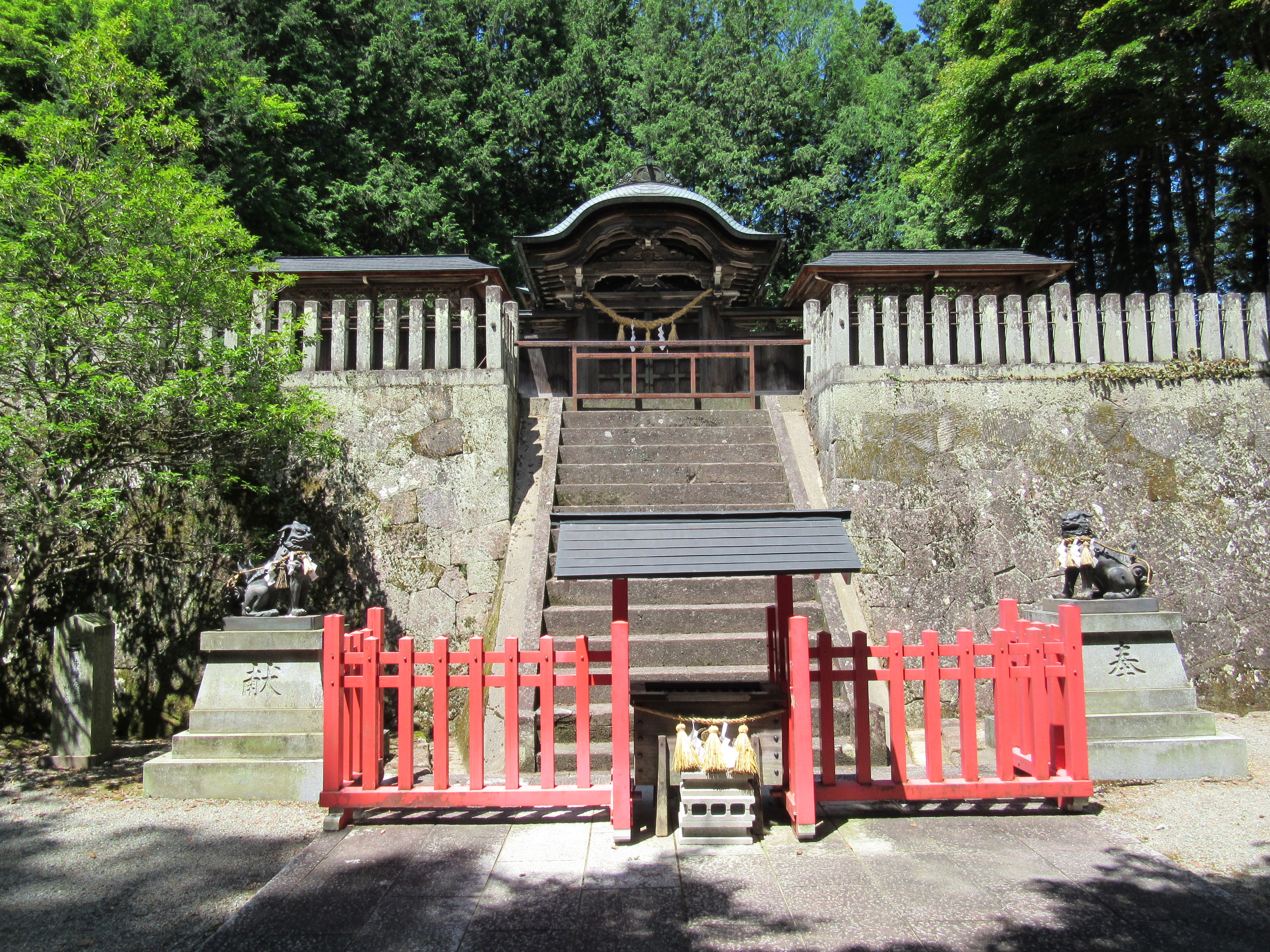
- Hida Tōshō-gū

- Location within Japan

Religion
- Affiliation: Shinto
- Deity: Tokugawa Ieyasu
- Type: Tōshō-gū

Location
- Location: 1004 Nishinoisshikimachi 3-chōme, Takayama-shi, Gifu-ken 506-0031
- Coordinates: 36.1343°N 137.2436°E

Architecture
- Founder: Kanamori Shigeyori
- Established: 1619

Hida Tōshō-gū (飛騨東照宮) is a Shinto shrine in the city of Takayama, Gifu Prefecture, Japan. It is dedicated to the first Shōgun of the Tokugawa Shogunate, Tokugawa Ieyasu.

The Takayama Tōshō-gū was built in 1619 by Kanamori Shigeyori, the daimyō of Takayama Domain. In 1818, a sub-shrine, the Kinryu Jinja (金龍神社) was added to its precincts to honor the spirits of the Kanamori clan. The shrine's annual festival is April 15.

== See also ==
- Tōshō-gū
- List of Tōshō-gū
