= Hōraisan Tōshō-gū =

- 鳳来山東照宮
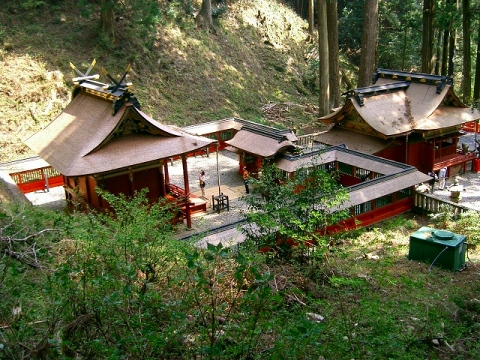
- Hōraisan Tōshō-gū

- Hōraisan Tōshō-gū Hōraisan Tōshō-gū (Japan)

Religion
- Affiliation: Shinto
- Deity: Tokugawa Ieyasu
- Festival: April 17
- Type: Tōshō-gū

Location
- Location: Shinshiro, Aichi, Japan
- Interactive map of Hōraisan Tōshō-gū
- Coordinates: 34.9788°N 137.5875°E

Architecture
- Founder: Tokugawa Iemitsu
- Established: 1651

Website
- Official website

Hōraisan Tōshō-gū (鳳来山東照宮) is a Shinto shrine located in the city of Shinshiro, Aichi Prefecture, Japan. It enshrines the deified first Shōgun of the Tokugawa shogunate, Tokugawa Ieyasu.

== History ==
The Hōraisan Tōshō-gū was established by Shōgun Tokugawa Iemitsu as a branch of the Nikkō Tōshō-gū within the holy mountain Buddhist temple of Hōrai-ji as part of his rebuilding of the temple in 1648. Abe Tadaaki, the daimyō of Oshi Domain and Ōta Sukemune, daimyō of Hamamatsu Domain were ordered to oversee the construction. The work was not completed until 1651, during the tenure of his successor, Shogun Tokugawa Ietsuna, who had assigned Honda Toshinaga, daimyō of Yokosuka Domain and Ogasawara Tadatomo of Yoshida Domain to the task. Various other daimyō were invited to contribute votive stone lanterns to the shrine, and the shogunate donated the sword used by Tokugawa Ieyasu at the Battle of Sekigahara to the new shrine to give it additional prestige. The shrine was repaired ten times during the course of the Tokugawa shogunate.

The Honden, Heiden, Middle Gate, Ablution font and two sets of carved wood panels on the shrine wall are all designated as Important Cultural Properties of Japan.

== See also ==
- Tōshō-gū
- List of Tōshō-gū
