= Hōrai-ji =

Buddhist temple in Shinshiro, Aichi, Japan

- 鳳来寺
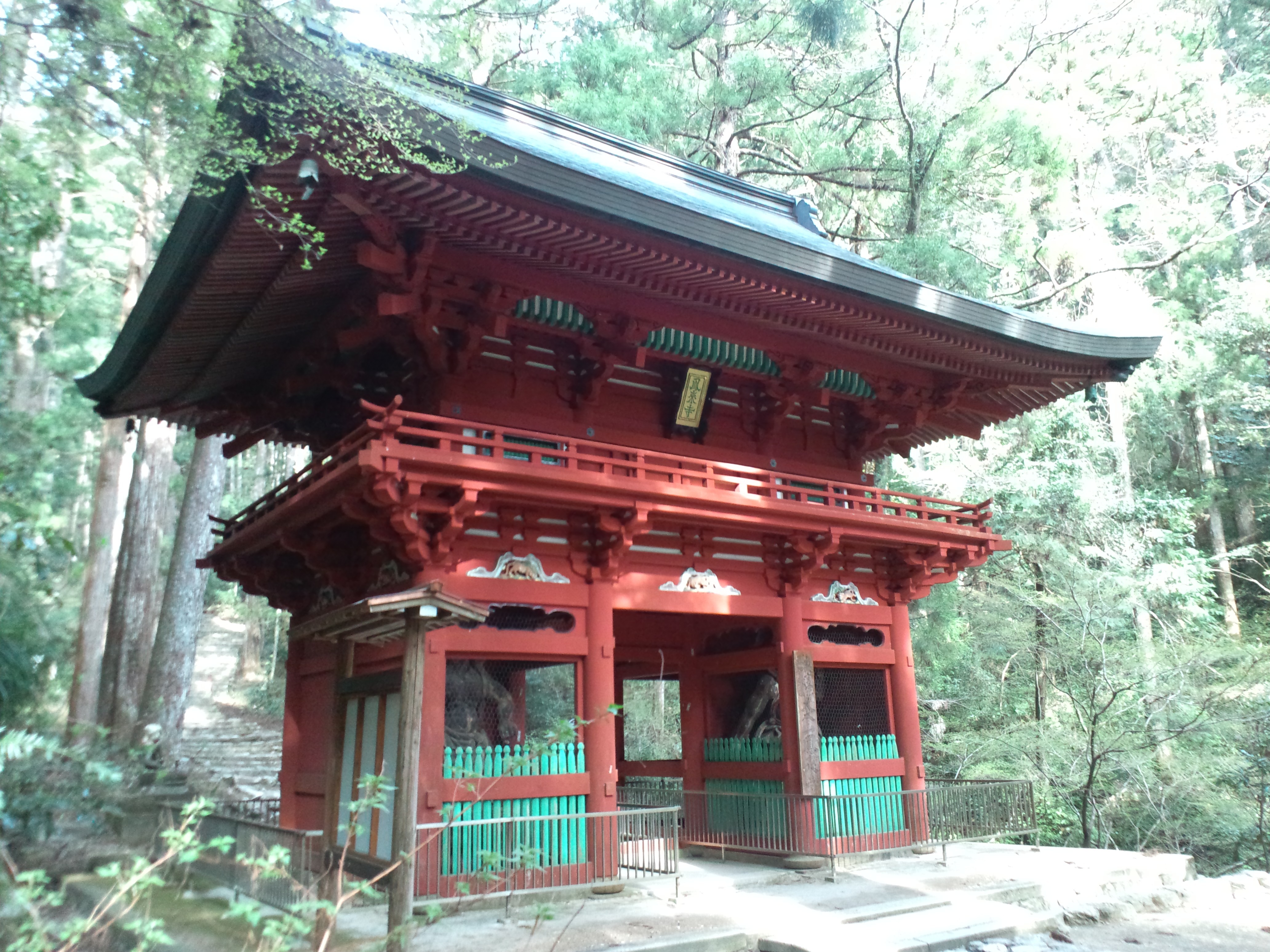
- Hōrai-ji Nio-mon

- Hōrai-ji Hōrai-ji (Japan)

Religion
- Affiliation: Buddhism
- Deity: Yakushi Nyōrai
- Rite: Shingon

Location
- Location: Hōraiji-1, Kadoya, Shinshiro, Aichi 441-1944
- Country: Japan
- Coordinates: 34°58′43.46″N 137°35′10.28″E

Hōrai-ji (鳳来寺) is a Shingon Buddhist temple located in the city of Shinshiro, Aichi Prefecture, Japan. Its main image is a statue of Yakushi Nyōrai. The temple is located on the 695 metres (2,280 ft) Mount Hōrai and is accessed by a flight of 1425 steps. The grounds have been designated Place of Scenic Beauty and Natural Monument since 1931. The area is also noted for its population of Eurasian scops owl, the prefectural bird of Aichi Prefecture.

== History ==
Per the temples own history, it was founded in 702 AD by a holy ascetic, Ryūshū Sennin, who carved statues of Yakushi Nyōrai, Nikkō Bosatsu, Gakkō Bosatsu, the Jūni Shinshō, Shi-Tennō and other deities out of the living trucks of trees on Mount Hōrai. Prayers at this location cured Emperor Monmu of an affliction, which led to its official recognition.

The temple was rebuilt in the Kamakura period by Minamoto no Yoritomo (who is also credited with building the 1425 stone steps), out of gratitude for sheltering him during the Heiji rebellion. Adachi Morinaga is also credited with building one of its chapels. The temple suffered from repeated fires during the Kamakura and Muromachi periods, so most written records have been destroyed; however, the archaeological record in the form of many pottery shards and sutra mounds indicates that the temple existed as a center of both Buddhism and folk religion into the Sengoku period. However, Toyotomi Hideyoshi was hostile to the temple, and confiscated most of its estates, allowing it a kokudaka of only 300 koku, whereupon the temple fell into rapid decline.

Hōrai-ji recovered considerably during the Edo period, and it was especially favored by Odai no Kata (Tokugawa Ieyasu's mother). Under the Tokugawa Iemitsu, its revenues were increased to 1350 koku and the Hōraisan Tōshō-gū was built in 1651. The temple belonged to both the Shingon and the Tendai sects, and became a popular side-trip for travelers on the Tōkaidō.

The separation of Buddhism from Shinto and the hostile attitude of the new Meiji government towards Buddhism dealt a heavy blow to Hōrai-ji, and with the opening of the Tōkaidō Main Line railway, the number of pilgrims was reduced. The Shinto Hōraisan Tōshō-gū was separated from the Buddhist temple, and much of Mount Hōrai became national forest. In 1905, the temple was made a subsidiary of Hōrin-ji in Kyoto which amalgamated the Tendai portion of the temple back into the Shingon portion. The Main Hall burned down in 1915, and could not be rebuilt until 1974.

== Cultural Properties ==
=== Important cultural properties ===
==== Hōrai-ji Sanmon ====
The Sanmon of Hōrai-ji is a two-story Niōmon gate is one of its few surviving structures from the Edo period. It was built in 1651 as a donation from Shogun Tokugawa Iemitsu. The building is built of zelkova wood and is painted vermillion. It has a copper shingle roof in the irimoya-zukuri-style. The gate is decorated near the eaves with a bamboo and tiger motif on the front, peony and lion motif on the back, waves and rhinoceros motif on the east and clouds and kirin motif on the west. A major repair was carried out in 1988. The building has been protected as an Important Cultural Property of Japan since 1953.

== Gallery ==
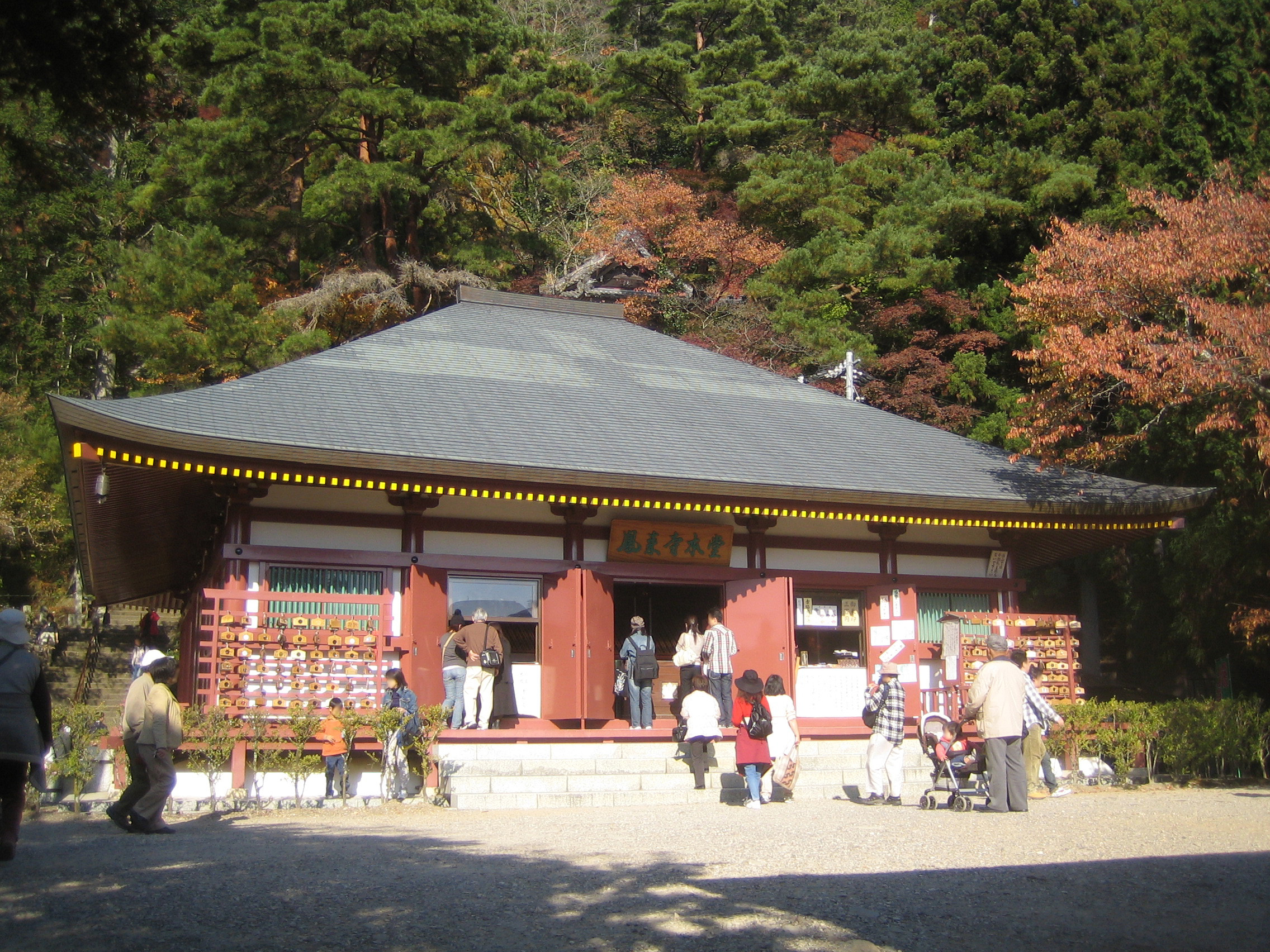
Hondō

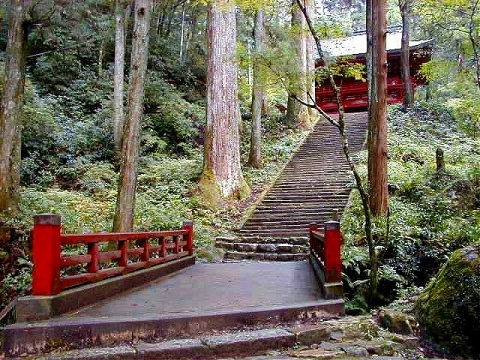
Hōrai-ji approach

== See also ==
- List of Places of Scenic Beauty of Japan (Aichi)
