= Tottori Tōshō-gū =

Shinto shrine in Tottori, Tottori Prefecture, Japan

- 鳥取東照宮
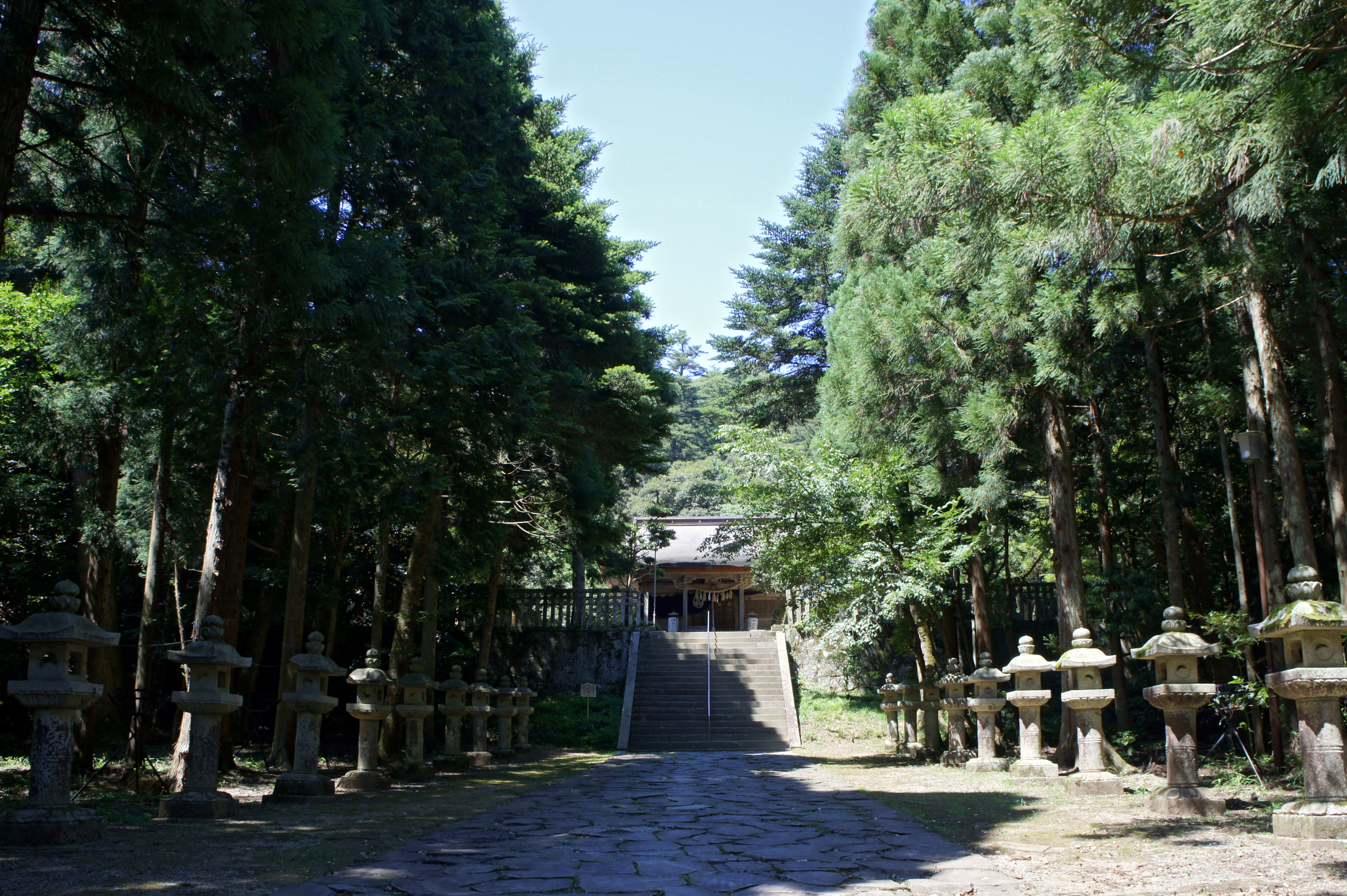
- Tottori Tōshō-gū

- Location within Tottori Prefecture Location within Japan

Religion
- Affiliation: Shinto
- Deity: Tokugawa Ieyasu
- Type: Tōshō-gū

Location
- Location: 87 Kamimachi, Tottori-shi, Tottori-ken
- Interactive map of Tottori Tōshō-gū
- Coordinates: 35°30′04″N 134°14′46″E

Architecture
- Founder: Ikeda Mitsunaka
- Established: 1650

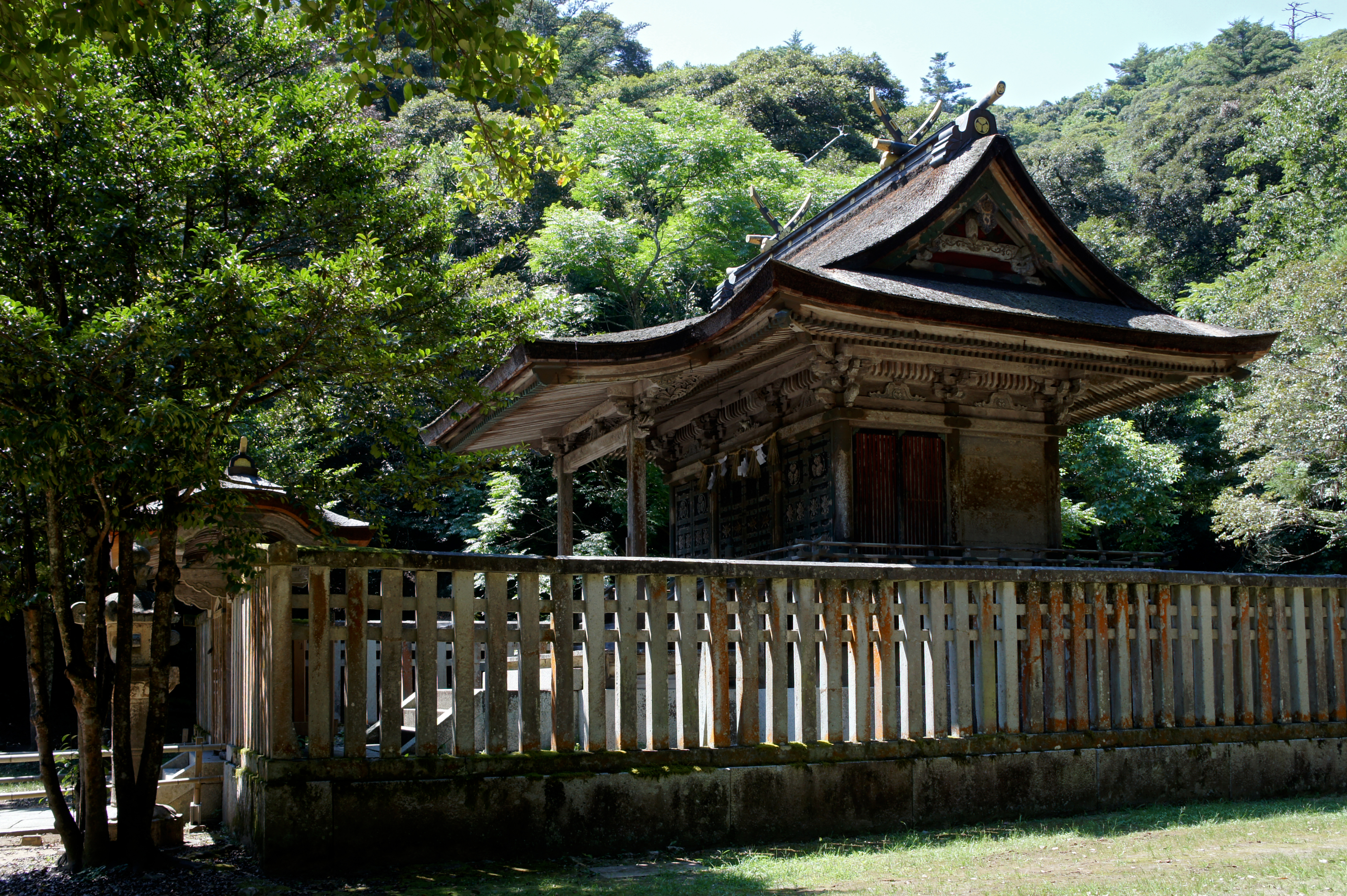
right Honden (1650), an Important Cultural Property

The Tottori Tōshō-gū (鳥取東照宮) is a Shinto shrine located in the city of Tottori, Tottori Prefecture, Japan. Until 2011, it was called the Ōchidani Jinja (樗谿神社). Four structures of the shrine, the Honden, Haiden and Heiden, and Karamon gate are designated National Important Cultural Properties. It is surrounded by a public park.

== History ==
Initially called the Inaba Tōshō-gū (因幡東照宮) after Inaba Province, the shrine was constructed by Ikeda Mitsunaka, the first daimyō of Tottori Domain under the Edo period Tokugawa shogunate. Mitsunaka became daimyō in 1632 at the age of three, but it was only 16 years later, in December 1649, that he was allowed to first visit his domain. In commemoration of this event, he petitioned the shogunate for permission to construct at shrine to Tōshō Dai-gongen, the deified spirit of Tokugawa Ieyasu, who was his great-grandfather. Although the Ikeda clan was officially classed as a tozama daimyō, this connection with Tokugawa Ieyasu allowed the clan extraordinary privileges, and permission was granted. Construction was completed in 1650.

Following the Meiji restoration and the overthrow of the Tokugawa shogunate, the shrine was renamed Ōchidani Jinja in 1874, and the spirits of the Ikeda clan leaders (Ikeda Mitsunaka, Ikeda Tadao (Mitsunaka's father) and Ikeda Tadatsugu (Mitsunaka's uncle) and later Ikeda Yoshinori (the final daimyō) were added to the roster of kami. The shrine was granted the rank of "Prefectural Shrine" under the Modern system of ranked Shinto Shrines. In October 2011, the name was officially changed to Tottori Tōshō-gū

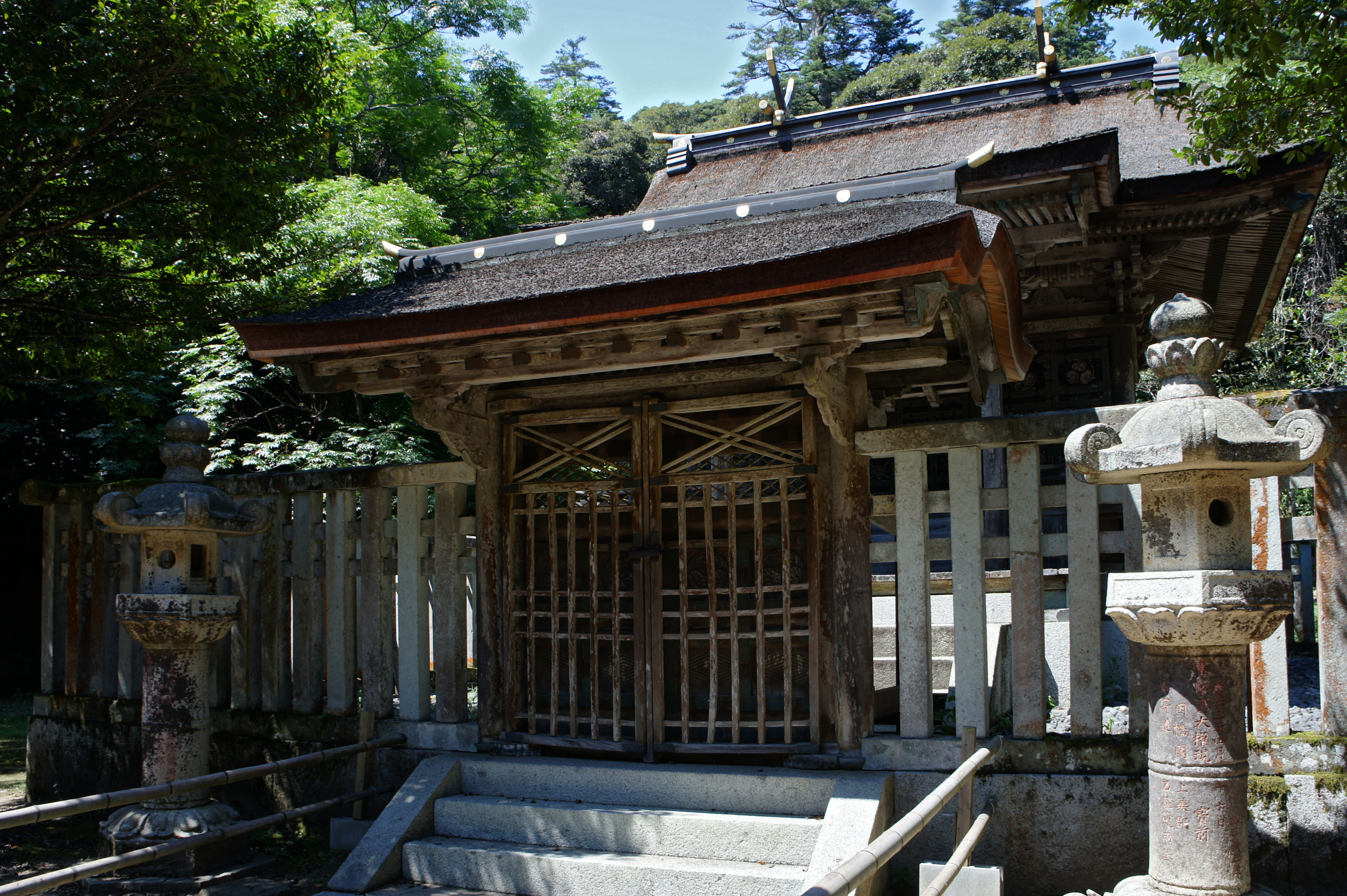
Karamon（ICP）

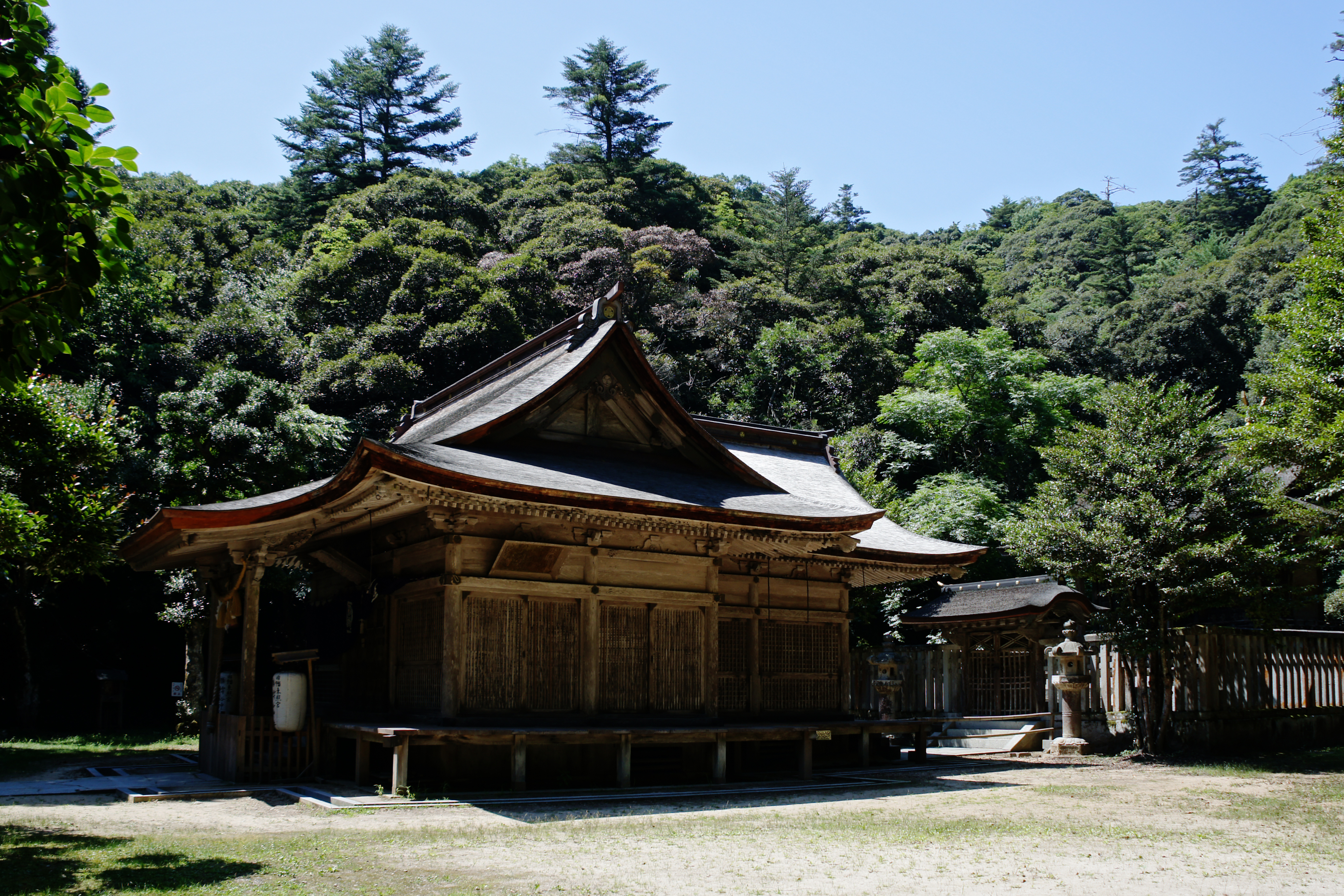
Heiden and Haiden（ICP）

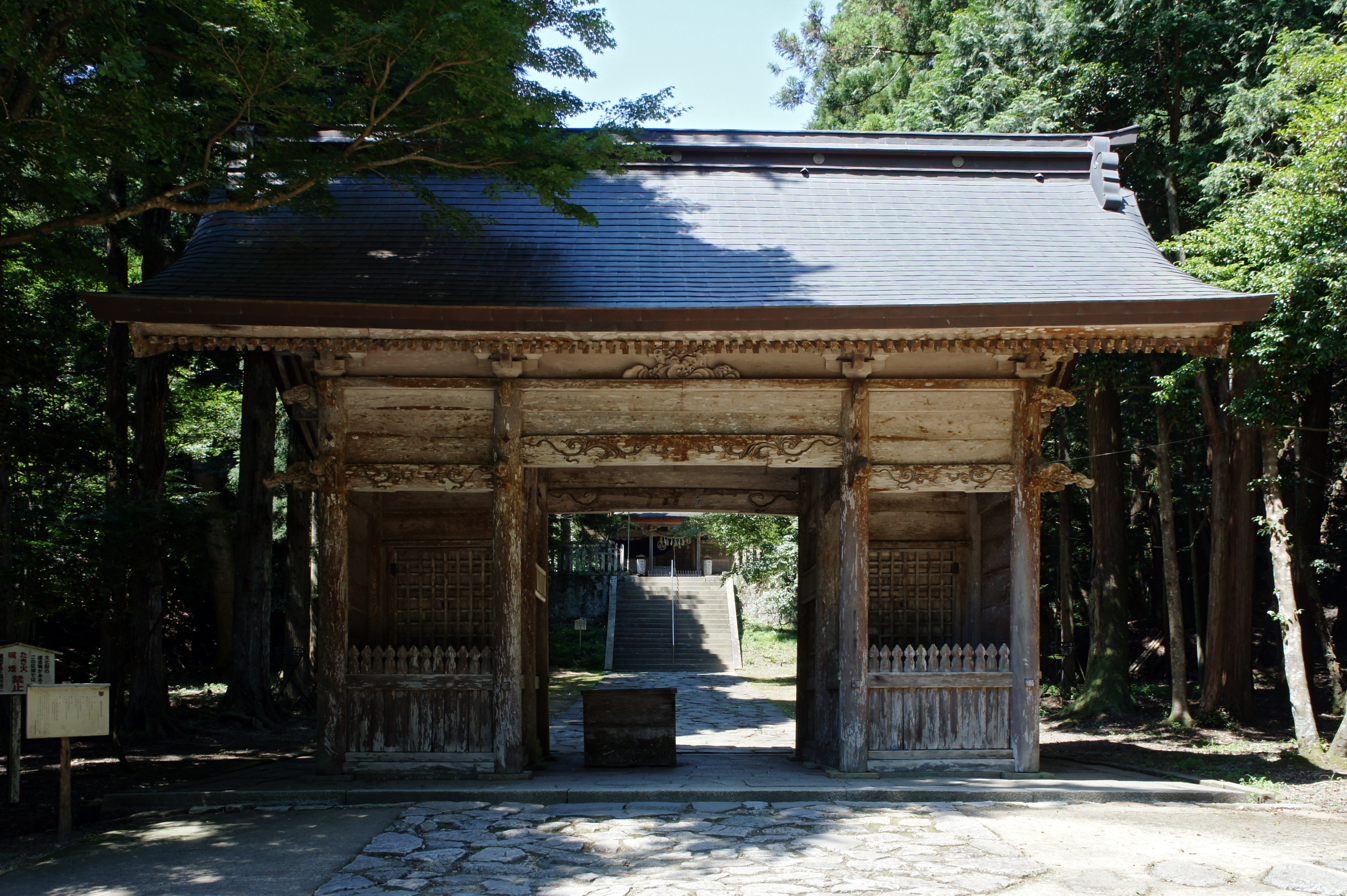
Zuishinmon

== See also ==
- List of Tōshō-gū
- Important Cultural Properties of Japan
