= Oshi Tōshō-gū =

Shinto shrine in Saitama Prefecture, Japan

Oshi Tōshō-gū (忍東照宮)
- Location within Japan

Religion
- Affiliation: Shinto

Location
- Interactive map of Oshi Tōshō-gū (忍東照宮)
- Coordinates: 36.1384228°N 139.4502321°E

Oshi Tōshō-gū (忍東照宮) is a Shinto shrine in Gyōda, Saitama Prefecture, Japan. It enshrines the first Shōgun of the Tokugawa Shogunate, Tokugawa Ieyasu.

== See also ==
- Tōshō-gū
- List of Tōshō-gū
