= Hanazono Shrine =

Shinto shrine in Shinjuku, Tokyo, Japan

Hanazono Shrine 花園神社
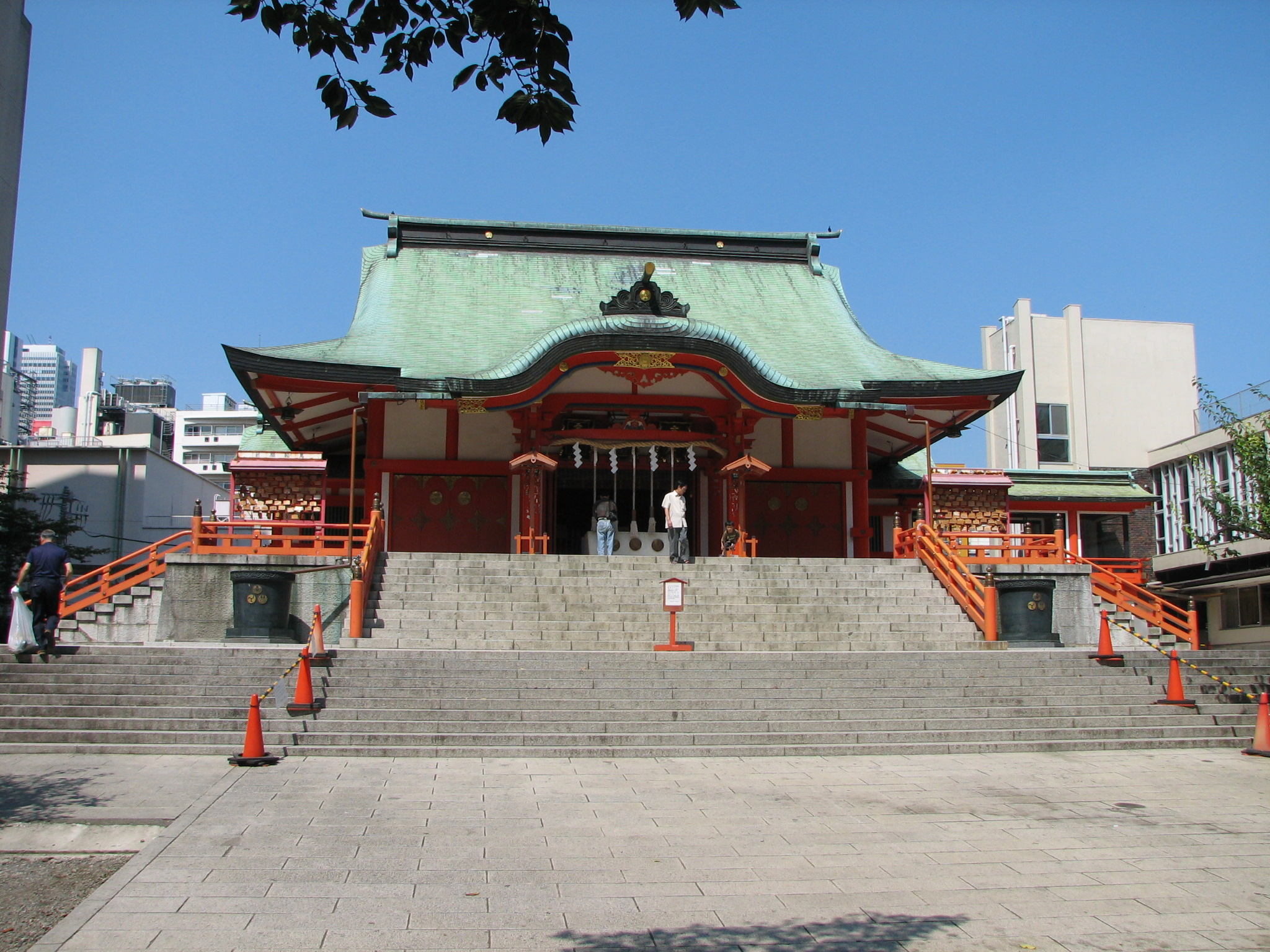

- Location within Japan

Religion
- Affiliation: Shinto

Location
- Interactive map of Hanazono Shrine 花園神社
- Coordinates: 35°41′37″N 139°42′19″E

The Hanazono Shrine (花園神社, Hanazono Jinja) is a Shinto shrine located in Shinjuku, Tokyo, Japan. This shrine was founded in the mid-17th century. Nestled in the heart of Tokyo's Shinjuku ward, Hanazono Jinja was constructed in the Edo period by the Hanazono family. This Inari shrine—a shrine dedicated to Inari, the androgynous god of fertility and worldly success—is a favorite place for businessmen to pray for successful ventures.

== History ==
Hanazono Shrine was originally founded before the start of the Edo period, about 250 meters south of its present-day location. In the Kan'ei era, the shrine was relocated to the gardens of the Owari-Tokugawa family, in an area that had until then been a prolific flower garden, to make space for the villa of a shogun’s vassal. Before the Meiji period, a branch temple of a Shingon Buddhism sect was enshrined with Hanazono’s Shinto shrine, and the Buddhist chief priest served as the manager of both. During the Meiji Restoration that began in March of 1868, the Buddhist object of worship was abolished from Hanazono, and the religious space returned to only a Shinto shrine. At the time, it was named simply “town Inari shrine” because of a mistake in the submission to the official list of names. It was officially named "Hanazono Shrine" in 1965.

== Annual events ==
- January 1 - Gantan, The Japanese New Year
- January - Yunohana-Matsuri, New Year's bonfires
- February - Setsubun Festival
- February - Hatsu'uma-Matsuri, Festival on The First Horse's Day
- May - Shinkō-sai, annual festival
- June 30 - Nagoshi-no-harae, purification ceremony in the middle of the year
- August - Obon
- November - Tori-no-Ichi, open-air market held at Rooster's day
- December 31 - Toshikoshi-no-ōharae, purification ceremony in Ōmisoka, the last day of the year

== Images ==
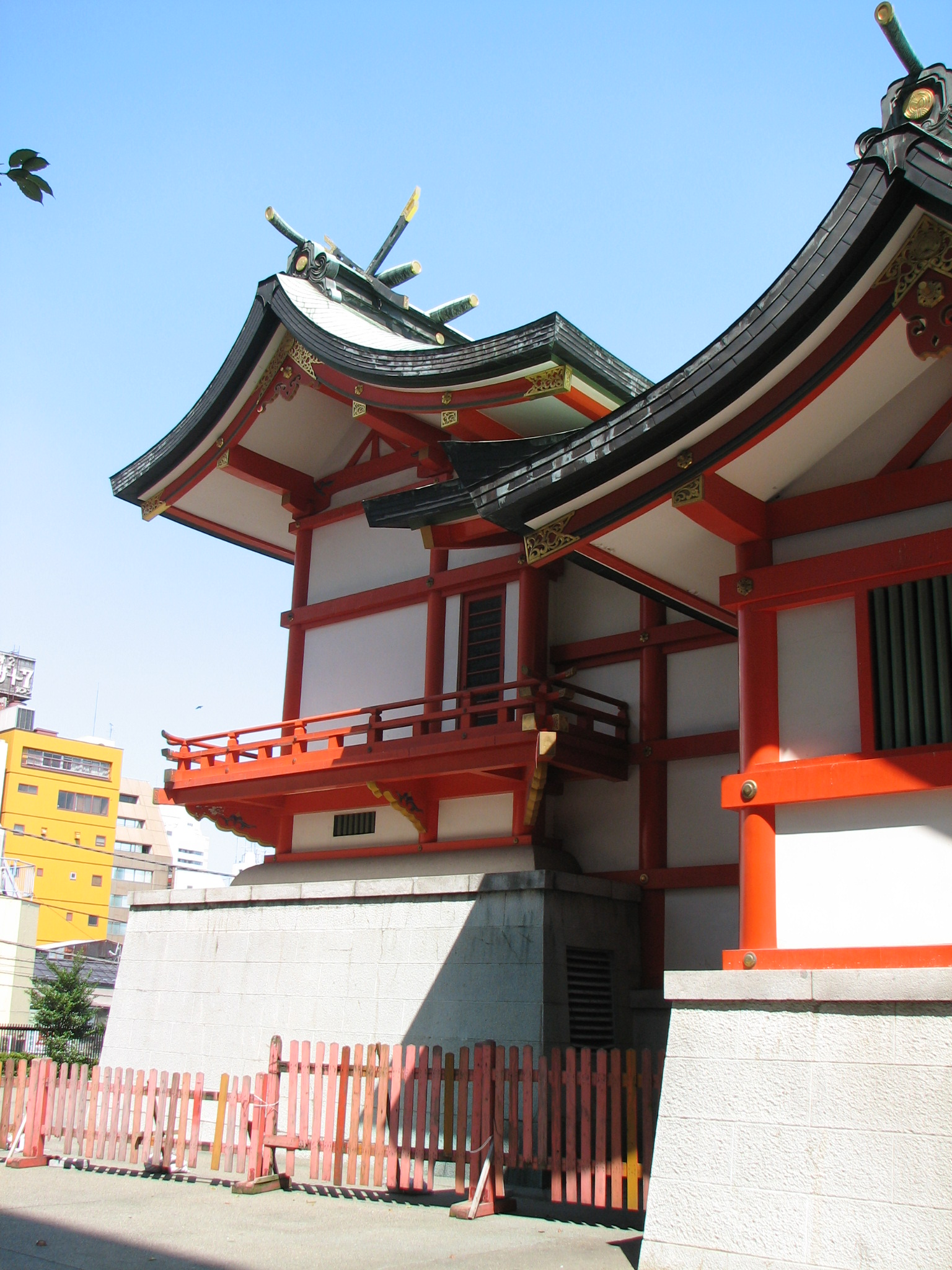
Main building

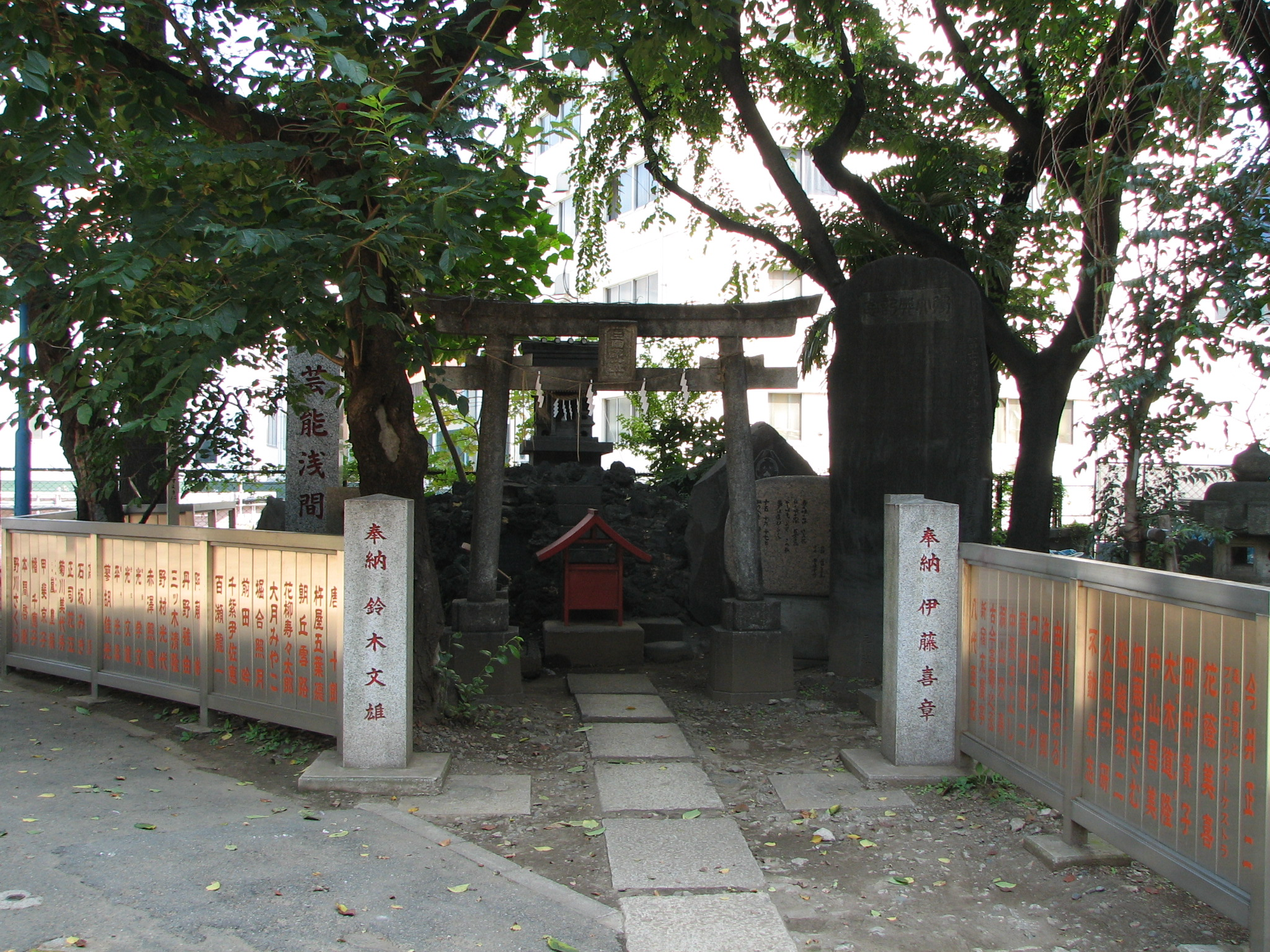
Geinō-Asama-jinja, shrine for entertainers, in Hanazono-jinja

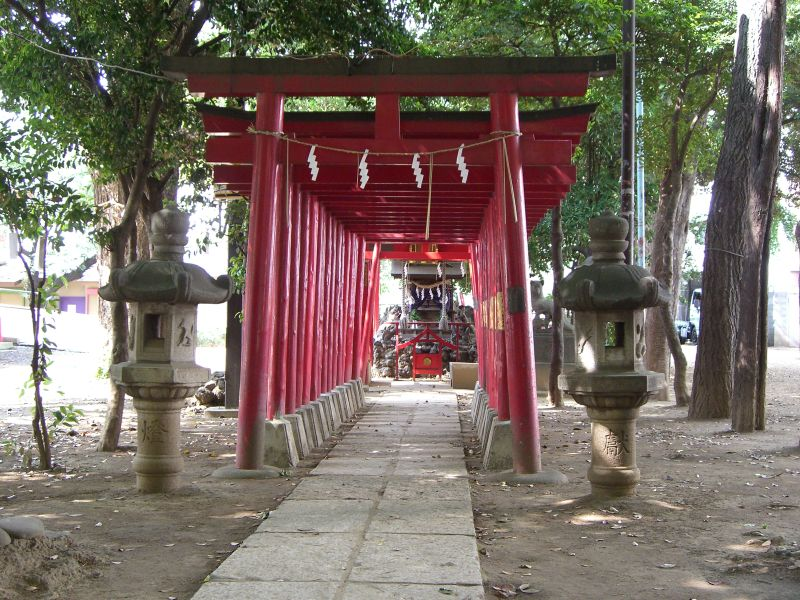
Torii gates in the precincts of Hanazono Jinja

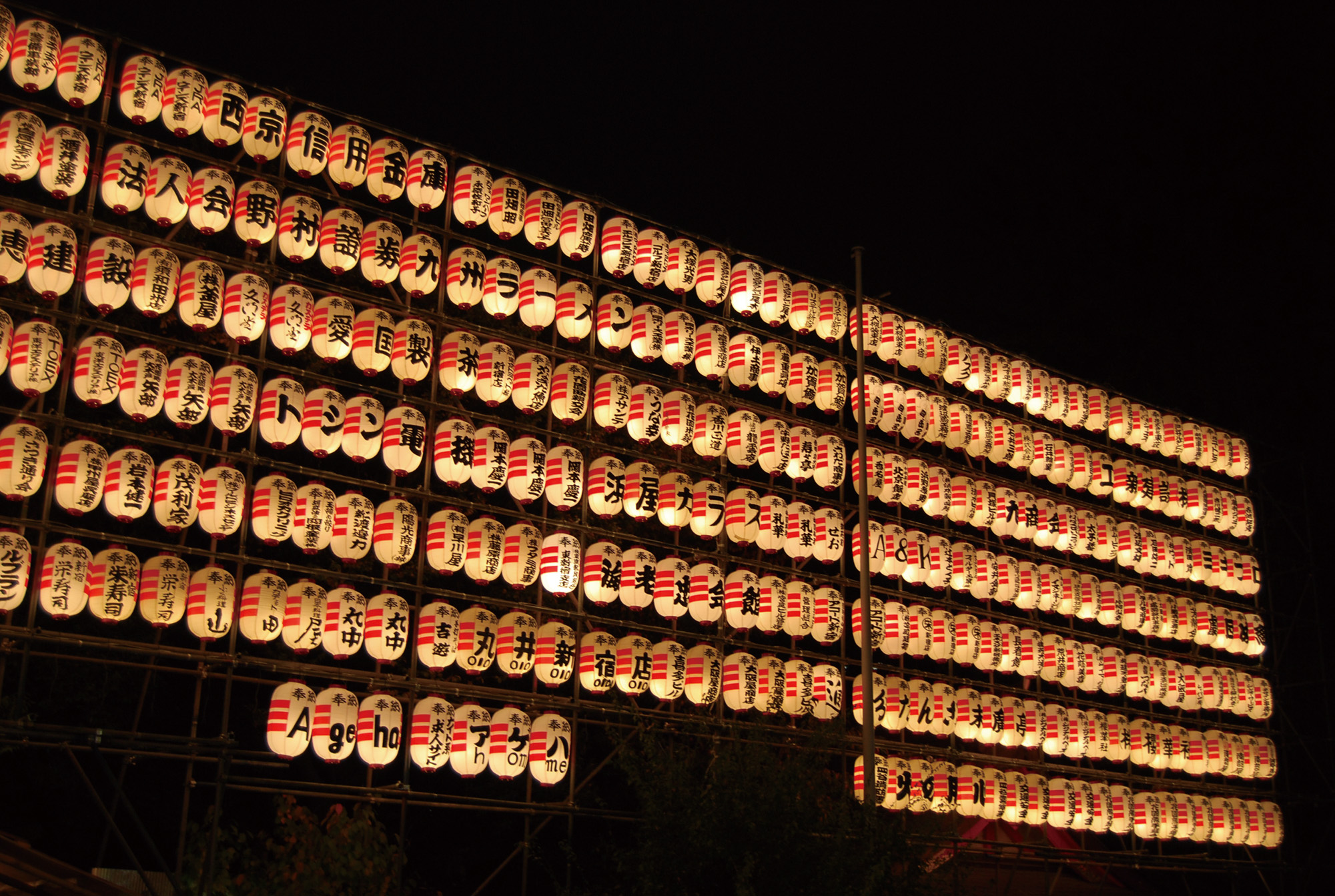
Thousand Lanterns of Tori-no-Ichi

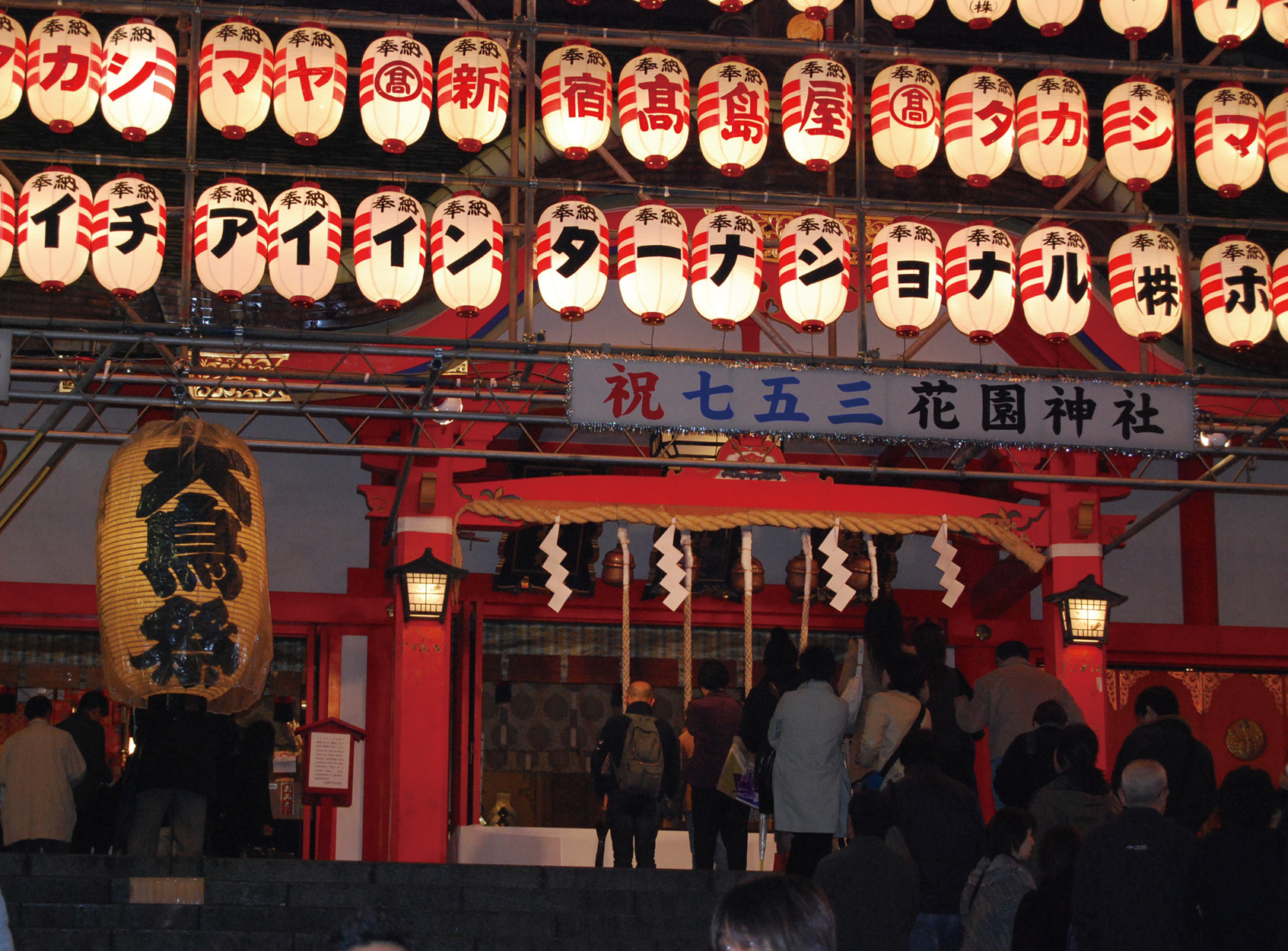
Shinto worshipers

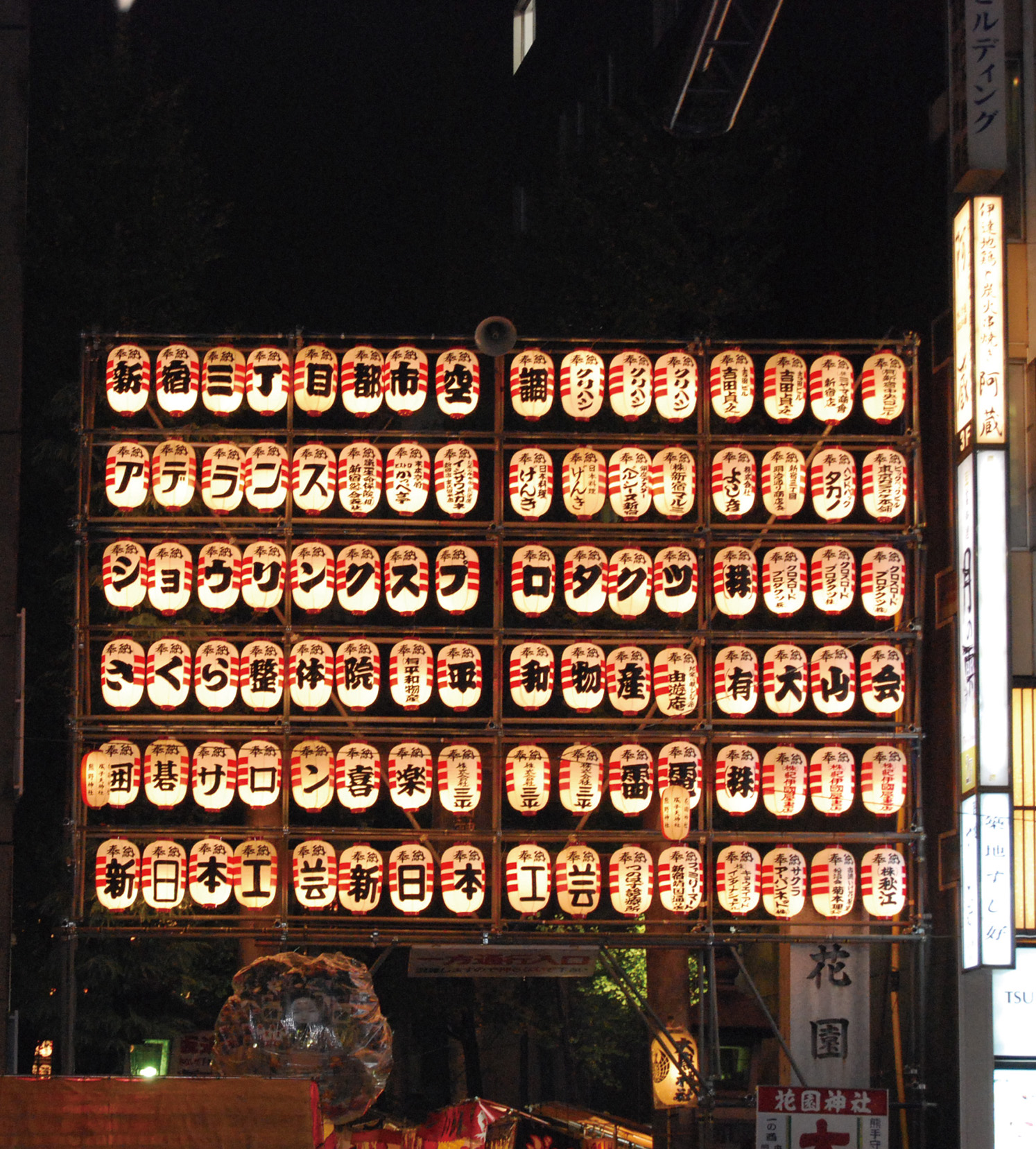
Festival Gate of Tori-no-Ichi

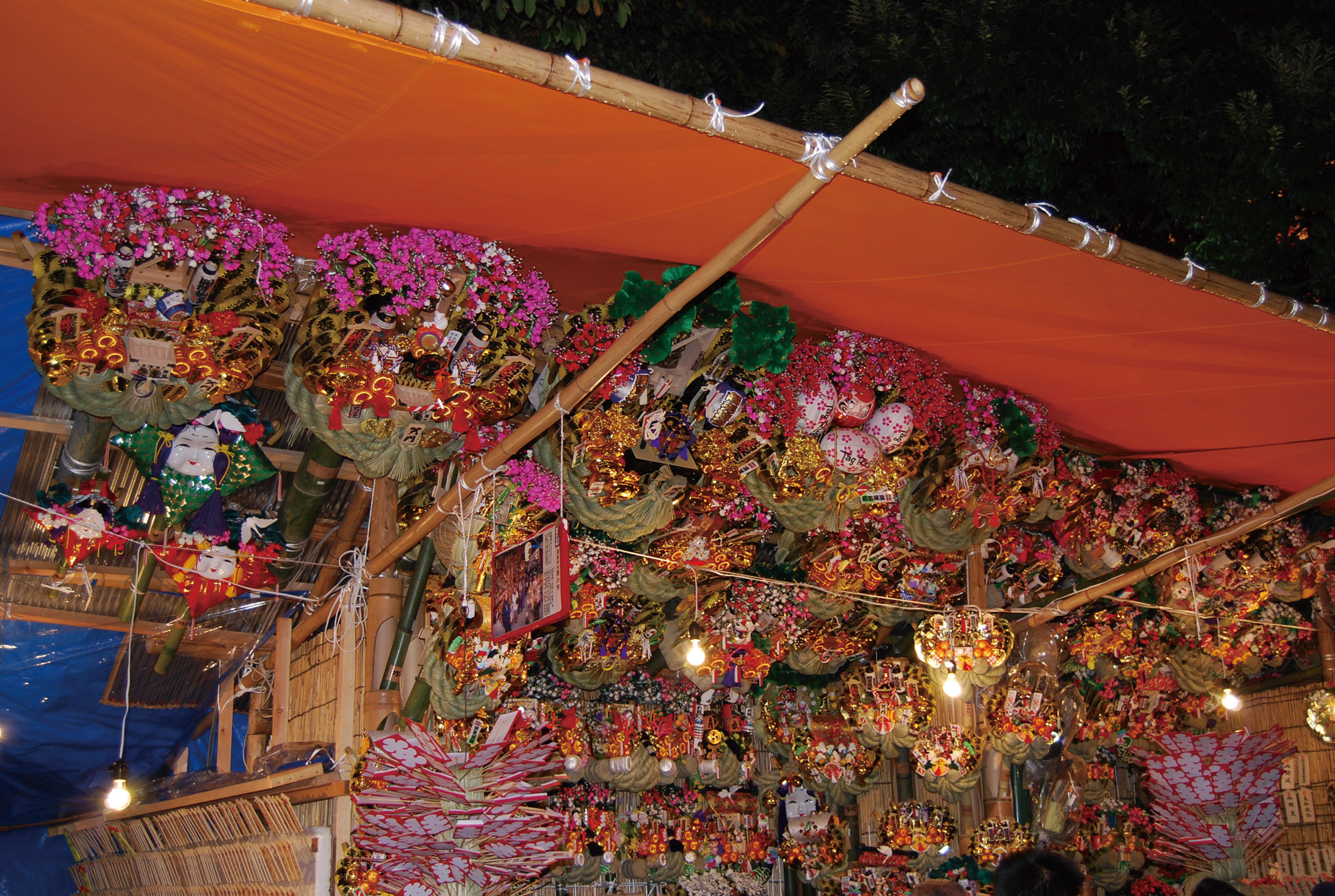
Tori-no-Ichi

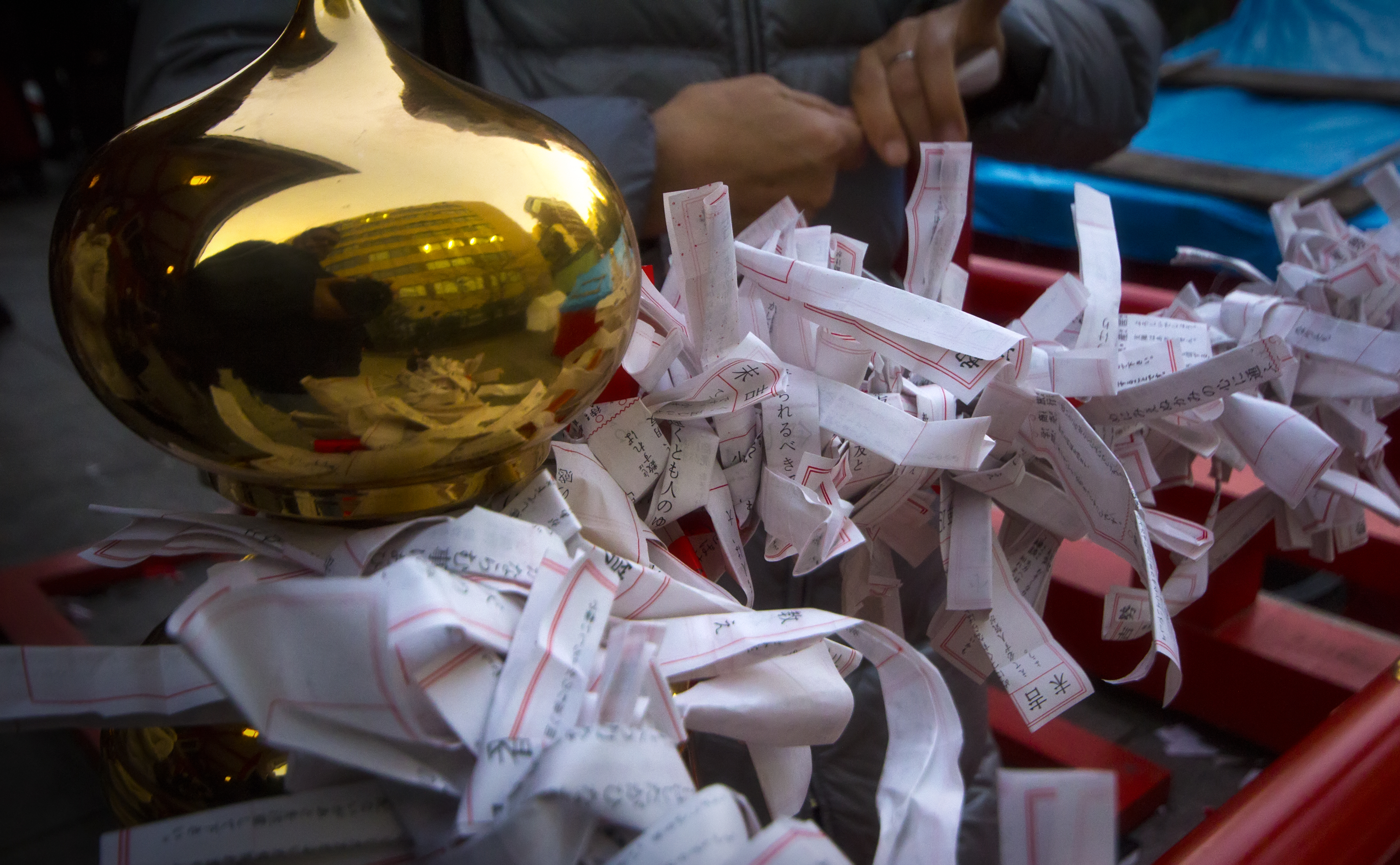
Fortunes tied to the stair railings at Hanazono-jinja on New years Day 2013

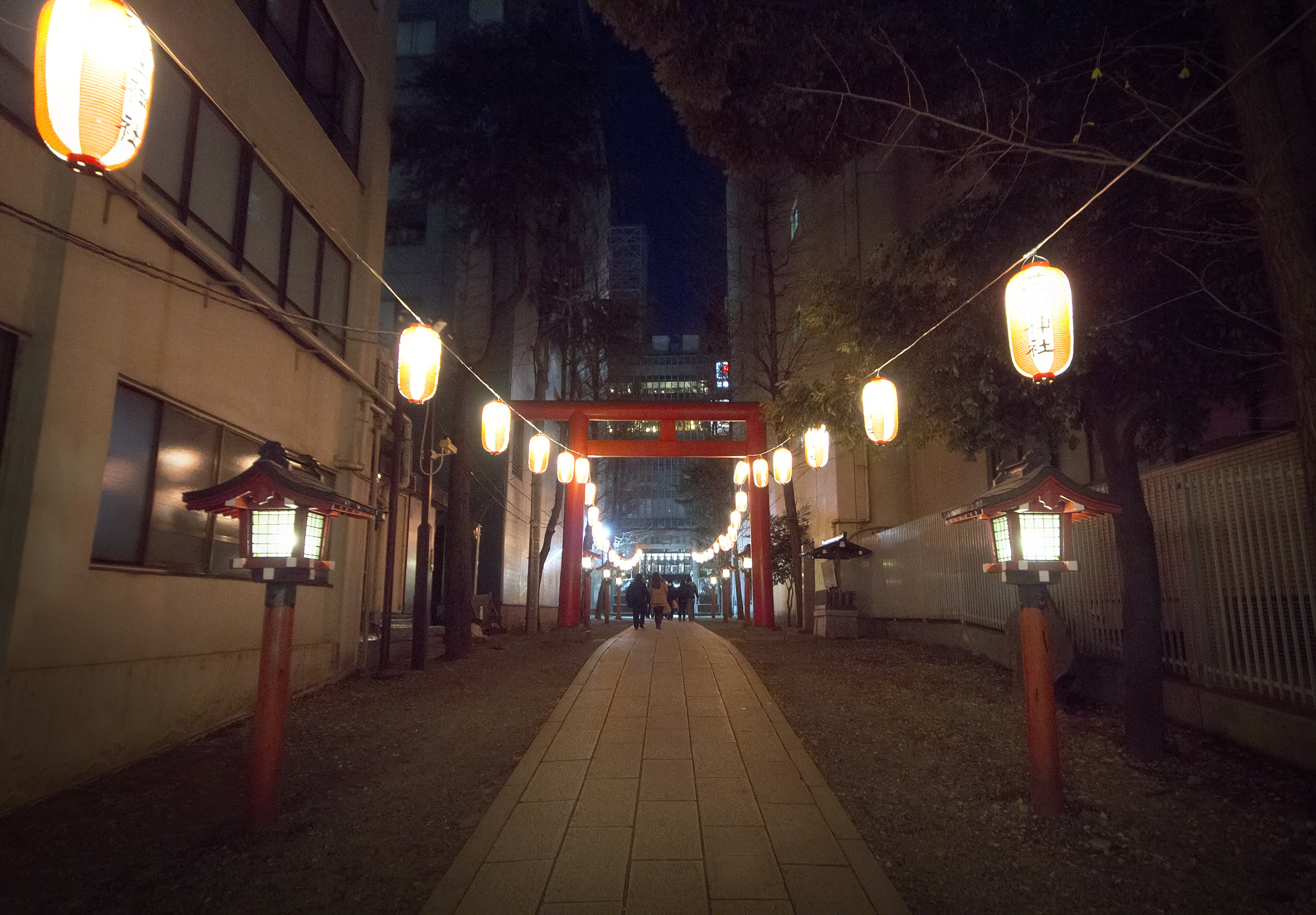
Walking along the lit path of Torii at night at Hanazono Jinja

== See also ==
- List of Tōshō-gū
