= Maebashi Tōshō-gū =

Japanese Shinto shrine

- 前橋東照宮
- Torii on the approach to Maebashi Tōshōgū

- Location within Gunma Prefecture Location within Japan

Religion
- Affiliation: Shinto
- Deity: Tokugawa Ieyasu
- Festival: April 17
- Type: Tōshō-gū

Location
- Location: 3-13-19 Otemachi, Maebashi-shi, Gunma-ken 371-0026
- Coordinates: 36°23′41″N 139°03′44″E

Architecture
- Style: Irimoya-zukuri
- Founder: Matsudaira Naomoto
- Established: 1624

Website
- www.toshogu.net/maebashi/

Maebashi Tōshō-gū (前橋東照宮) is a Shinto Shrine dedicated to Tokugawa Ieyasu in the city of Maebashi, Gunma Prefecture, Japan. It was established in 1624.

== History ==
Haiden

The Maebashi Tōshō-gū was initially established in 1624 by Matsudaira Naomoto (1604-1648) in Echizen-Katsuyama Domain, over which he had just been made daimyō. Matsudaira Naomoto was the 5th son of Yūki Hideyasu, and was thus grandson of Tokugawa Ieyasu. During his career, Matsudaira Naomoto and his successors were transferred so many times that they came to be known as the "wandering daimyō", and with each change in domain he had the Tōshō-gū disassembled and reconstructed at his new posting. In 1635, he was transferred to Ōno Domain, still in Echizen Province. In 1644, he was transferred to Yamagata Domain, and in 1648 he was transferred to Himeji Domain.

His son, Matsudaira Naomori, was transferred to Murakami Domain (1649), back to Himeji Domain (1667), Hita Domain (Bungo Province) (1682), Yamagata Domain (1686) and Shirakawa Domain (1692). Naomori's grandson, Matsudaira Akinori was transferred to Himeji Domain in 1741. His son, Matsudaira Tomonori, was transferred to Maebashi Domain in 1749 and rebuilt the Maebashi Tōshō-gū on its present site.

Due to flood damage, Maebashi Castle was abandoned and moved he moved to Kawagoe Castle in 1767 and the shrine was also relocated. In 1867, when Matsudaira Naokatsu returned his seat to Maebashi, he planned to move the Tōshō-gū as well, but due to the turmoil at the end of the Edo period, it was not actually rebuilt until 1871.

Under the pre-World War II State Shinto system of shrine ranking from 1879 through 1946, was officially designated as a "prefectural shrine".

== See also ==
- Tōshō-gū
- List of Tōshō-gū
