= Reikyū Shrine =

Shinto shrine in Nagasaki Prefecture, Japan

Reikyū Shrine (霊丘神社, Reikyū Jinja)
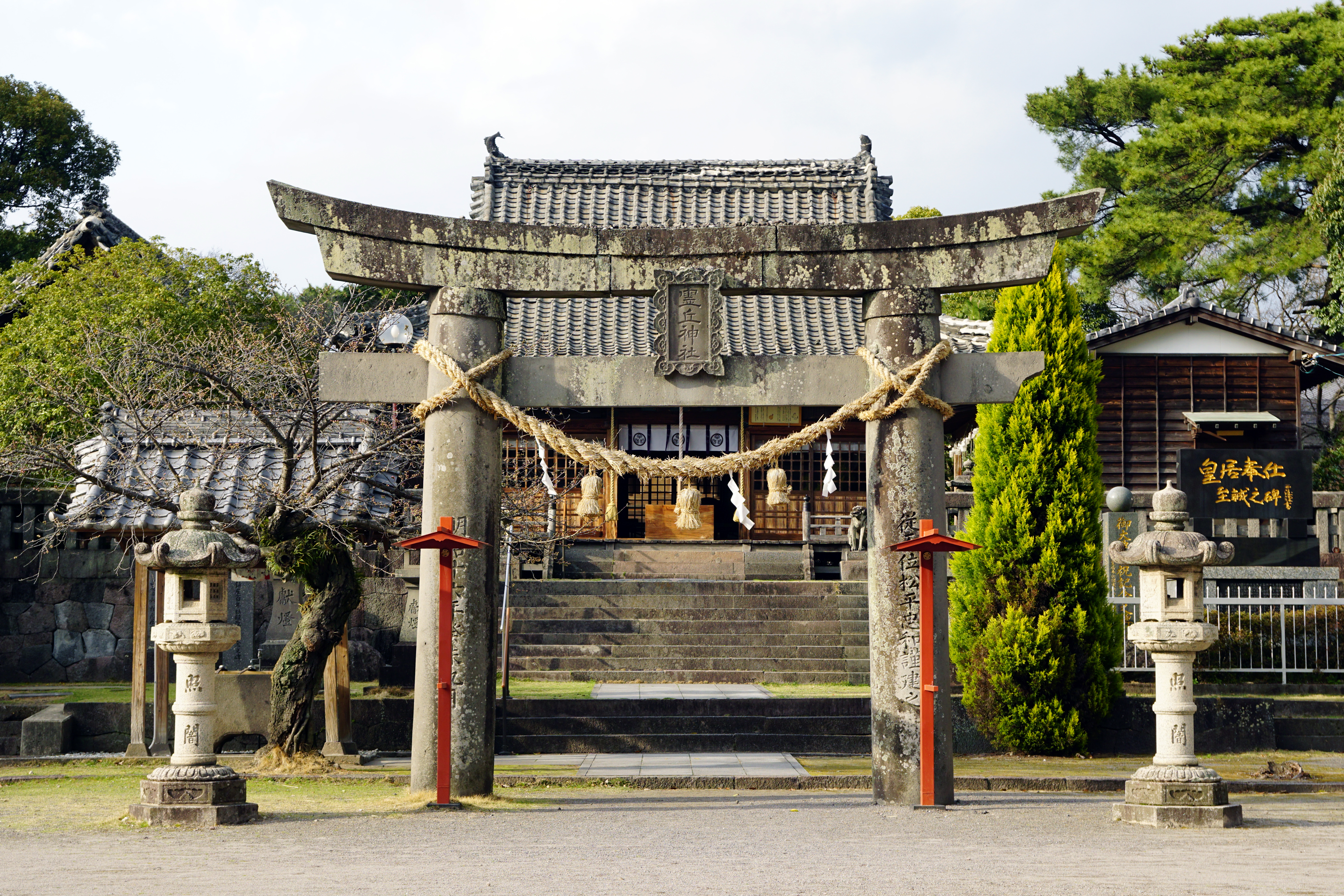
- Reikyū Shrine

- Location within Japan

Religion
- Affiliation: Shinto

Location
- Coordinates: 32.7822°N 130.3759°E

Reikyū Shrine (霊丘神社, Reikyū Jinja) is a Shinto shrine in Shimabara, Nagasaki Prefecture, Japan. It enshrines the first Shōgun of the Tokugawa Shogunate, Tokugawa Ieyasu.

== See also ==
- Tōshō-gū
- List of Tōshō-gū
