= Mito Tōshō-gū =

Shinto shrine in Ibaraki Prefecture, Japan

Mito Tōshōgū 水戸東照宮
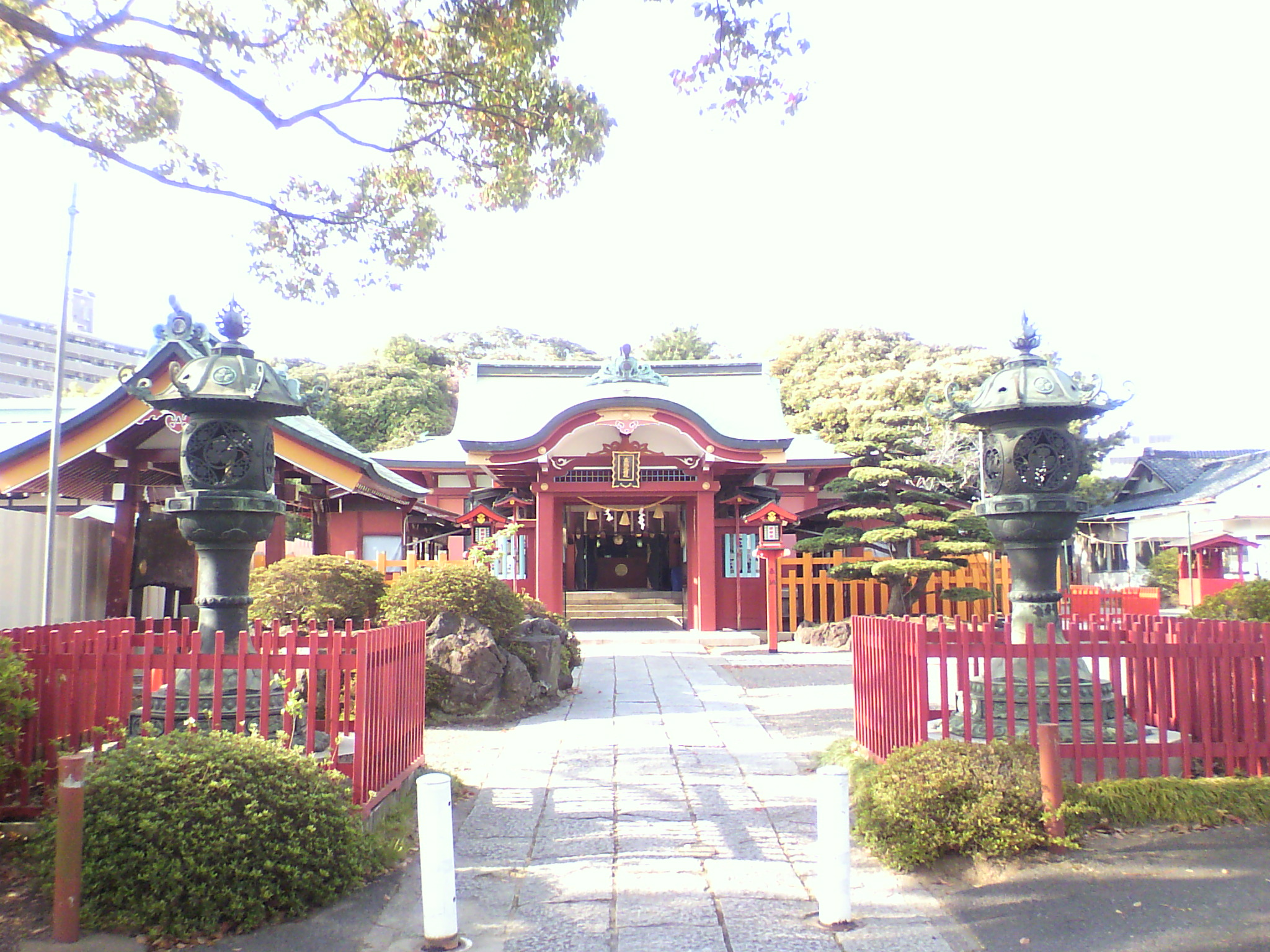
- Mito Tōshōgū

- Location within Ibaraki Prefecture Location within Japan

Religion
- Affiliation: Shinto
- Deity: Tokugawa Ieyasu
- Festival: April 17
- Type: Tōshō-gū

Location
- Location: 2-5-13 Miyamachi, Mito-shi, Ibarakiken 310-0015
- Interactive map of Mito Tōshōgū 水戸東照宮
- Coordinates: 36°22′21″N 140°28′24″E

Architecture
- Style: Irimoya-zukuri
- Founder: Tokugawa Yorifusa
- Established: 1621

Website
- gongensan-mito-toshogu.jp

Mito Tōshōgū (水戸東照宮) is the memorial shrine of Tokugawa Ieyasu located in the city of Mito, Ibaraki Prefecture, Japan.

== History ==
The Mito Tōshōgū was established by Tokugawa Yorifusa, the 11th son of Tokugawa Ieyasu and daimyō of Mito Domain in 1621. The shrine originally enshrined Tokugawa Ieyasu in the center, flanked by the Sannō Gongen on the left and Matarajin on the right (two protective spirits), and was under the control of a Buddhist temple, Daishō-ji. A chapel to Tokugawa Hidetada was added in 1624 and since then the deified spirits of the successive shoguns have been enshrined at the shrine. The name of the shrine's location was changed to "Tokiwayama" by Tokugawa Mitsukuni in 1699. The 9th daimyō of Mito Domain, Tokugawa Nariaki, in line with the nativist Mito School doctrines promoted by the domain, ordered that the temple be separated from the shrine, and that the Mito Tōshōgū be reformed along purely Shinto lines. This action was cited as one of the reasons for his dismissal from his posts within the shogunate administration and house arrest at Mito.

In 1875, under the State Shinto system of shrine ranking, the Mito Tōshōgū was officially designated as a "prefectural shrine". The spirit of Tokugawa Nariaki was added in 1936. The Honden of the shrine, which had been designated as an Important Cultural Property since 1917 was destroyed by American bombing in World War II. The Honden was rebuilt in 1962.

== Cultural properties ==
=== National Important Cultural Property ===
- Tachi (long sword) (太刀 銘則包作（附 糸巻太刀拵）), inscribed "Made by Norikane" (with thread-wrapped mounting), mid-Kamakura period. This is one of the few surviving swords made by Norikane, a master craftsman of the Bizen Fukuoka Ichimonji school. The blade is 76.7-cm long. It was worn by Tokugawa Ieyasu, later passed down to Tokugawa Yorifusa, who subsequently donated to the shrine.

=== Ibaraki Prefecture Designated Tangible Cultural Property ===
- Fully hair-patterned red-threaded dōmaru armor (総毛引紅糸威胴丸具足) Edo period. This armor is said to have been worn by Tokugawa Ieyasu and later dedicated to the shrine by Tokugawa Yorifusa.

An inscription on the inside of the helmet reveals that it was made by Iwai Yozaemon I, an armor maker from Nara. The Iwai family moved from Nara to Edo during the Kanbun era (1661-1672), gaining renown as the Shogunate's chief armor makers. The armor is currently on loan to Ibaraki Prefectural Museum of History).

== See also ==
- Tōshō-gū
- List of Tōshō-gū
- List of Shinto shrines
