= Hokkaidō Tōshō-gū =

Shinto shrine in Hakodate, Hokkaido Prefecture, Japan

- 北海道東照宮
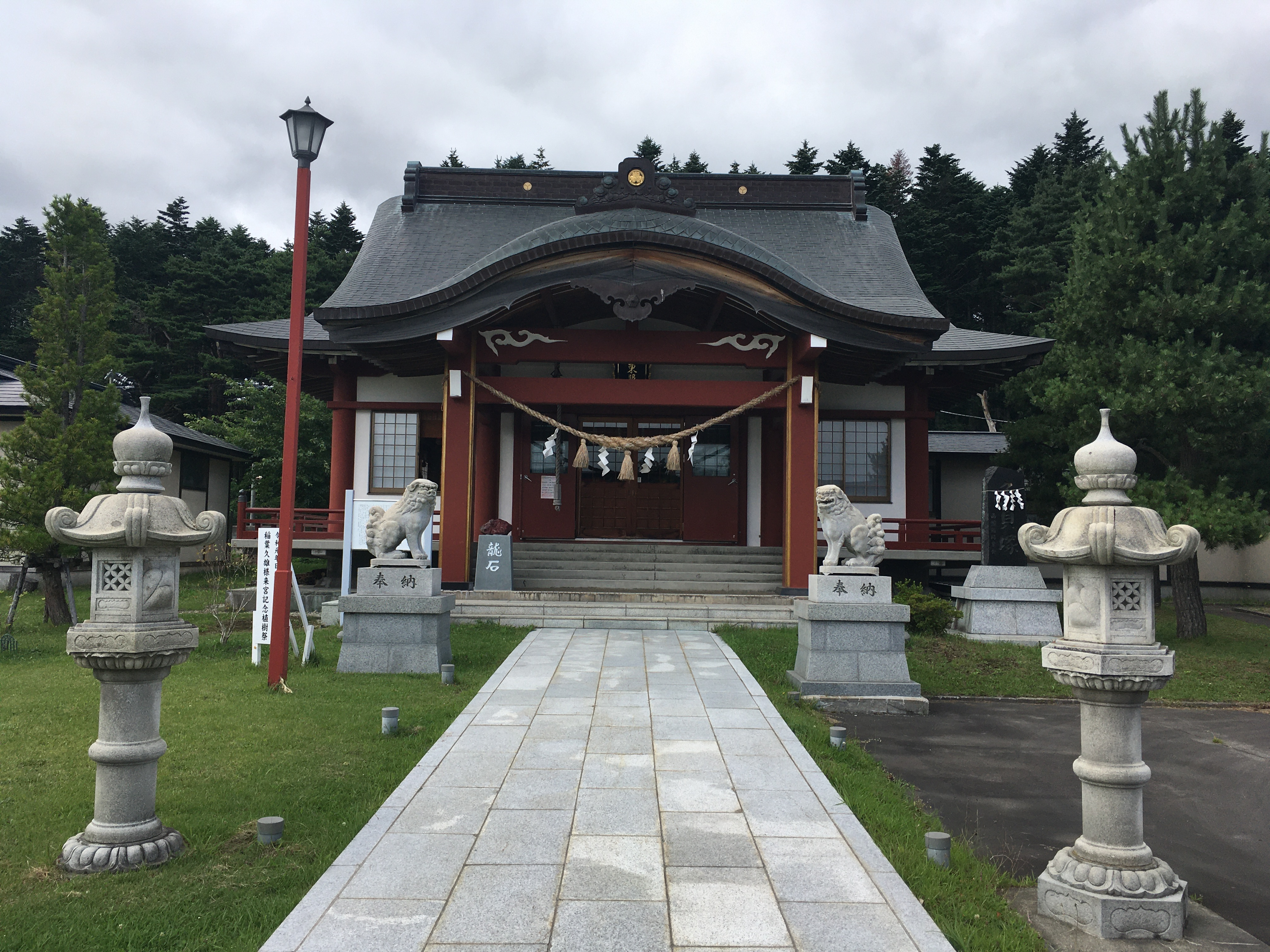

Religion
- Affiliation: Shinto
- Region: Hokkaido
- Deity: Tōshō Daigongen
- Type: former Prefectural shrine

Location
- Location: 82-153 Jinkawacho, Hakodate, Hokkaido 041-0833, Japan
- Municipality: Hakodate
- Country: Japan
- Interactive map of Hokkaidō Tōshō-gū
- Coordinates: 41°50′19″N 140°47′07″E

Architecture
- Established: 1864

Hokkaido Tōshō-gū (北海道東照宮) is a Shinto shrine in Hakodate, Hokkaido Prefecture, Japan. It enshrines the first Shōgun of the Tokugawa Shogunate, Tokugawa Ieyasu. It was previously known as Hakodate Tōshō-gū (函館東照宮).

== See also ==
- Tōshō-gū
- List of Tōshō-gū
