= Senba Tōshō-gū =

Important Shinto shrine founded in Kawagoe, Japan in 1617

Semba Tōshō-gū (仙波東照宮)
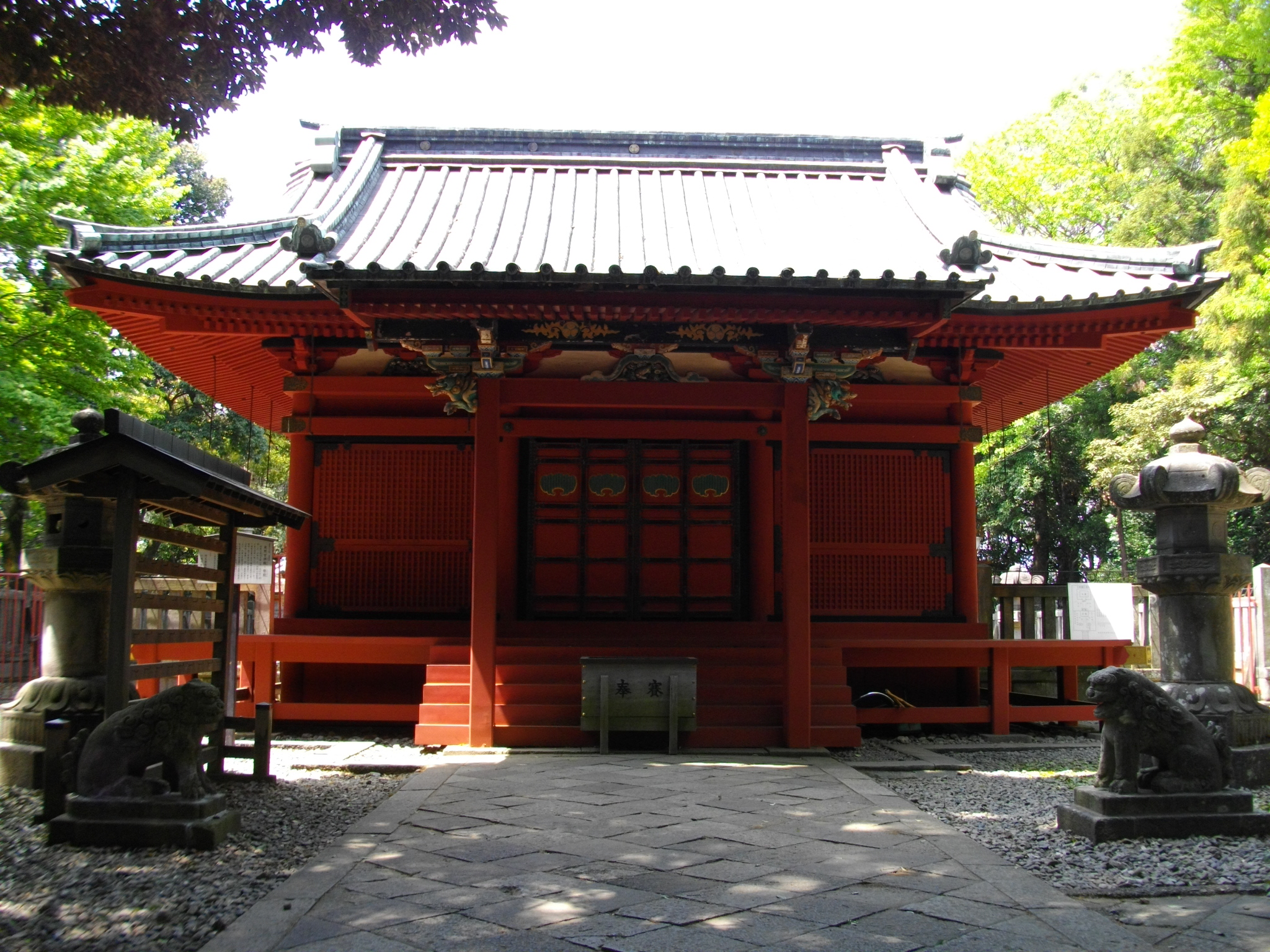
- Haiden of Semba Tōshō-gū

- Location within Japan

Religion
- Affiliation: Shinto

Location
- Coordinates: 35.9164°N 139.4893°E

Semba Tōshō-gū (仙波東照宮) is a Shinto shrine in Kawagoe, Saitama Prefecture, Japan. It enshrines the first Shōgun of the Tokugawa Shogunate, Tokugawa Ieyasu. It is enumerated as one of the Three Great Tōshō-gū Shrines (日本三大東照宮). The shrine was founded in 1617.

== See also ==
- Tōshō-gū
- List of Tōshō-gū
