= Sayama tea =

Type of Japanese green tea leaves

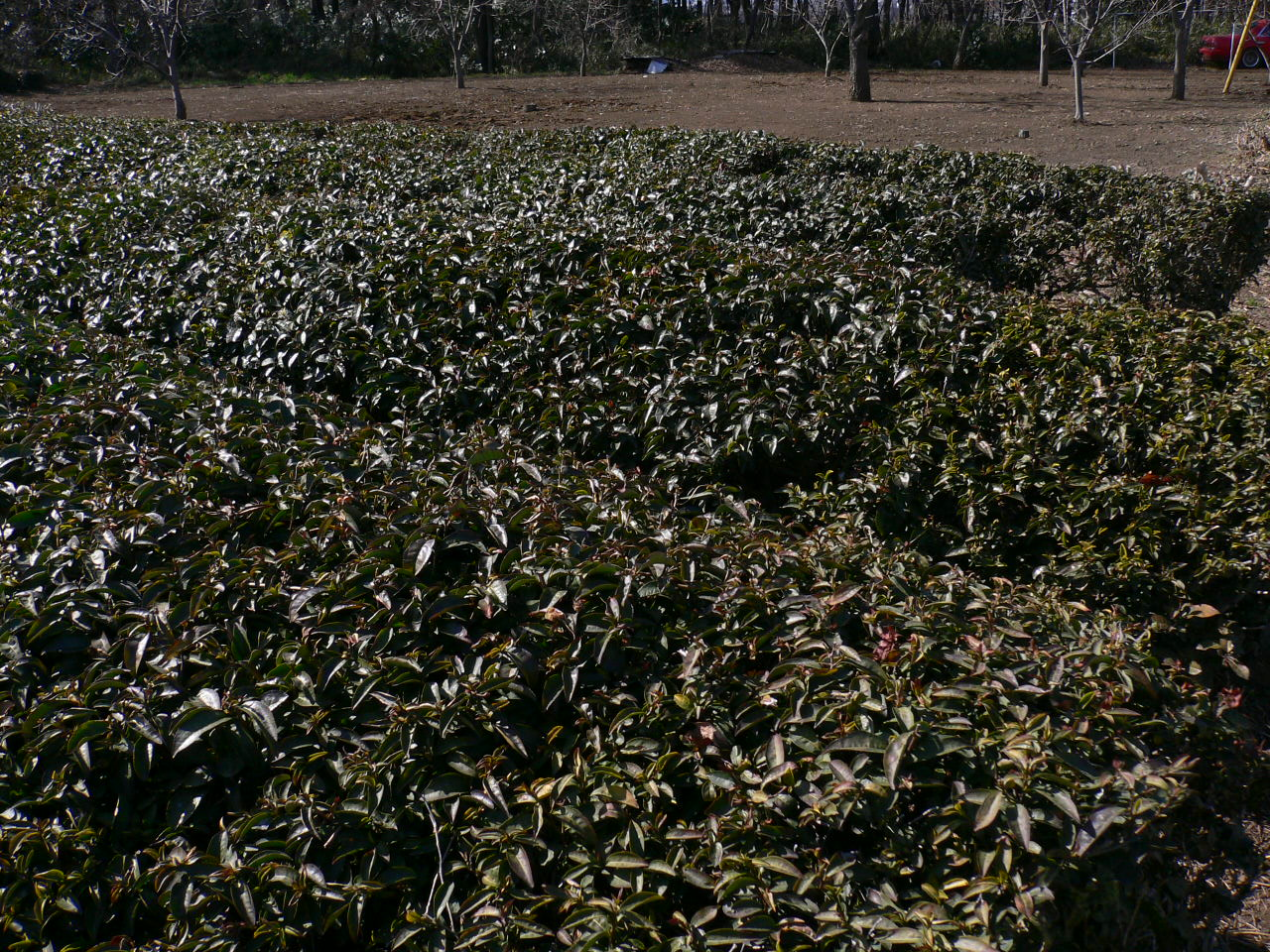
Sayama tea plantation

Sayama tea (狭山茶, Sayama-cha) is a type of green tea leaves produced mainly in the southwestern region of Saitama Prefecture and a small neighboring area in Northwestern Tokyo. In comparison to teas from other tea-growing regions in Japan, Sayama Tea is characterized with its thick leaves. This is because the region is considered to be fairly north, and the cool climate, which sometimes causes frost in winter, making trees unable to survive without thick leaves.

== Characteristics ==
Through selective breeding, efforts to develop tea trees strong in cold weather have been undertaken for many years. As a result, trees of Sayama Tea evolved to have thick leaves that can withstand cold weather. Tea extracted from such thick leaves resulted in a distinct sweet and rich flavor. Sayama tea has been found to have some of the highest levels of the beneficial antioxidants found in green tea.

== Region ==
The Musashino Plateau on which Sayama Tea is grown is suitable for tea growing. The plateau consists of two layers. The lower layer consists of conglomerates and sandstones that were brought to this region by rivers. The upper layer is made of a reddish loam created by the accumulation of volcanic ash. Together, these two layers make the region unsuitable for growing rice but suitable for tea growing, which requires high precipitation and high soil permeability.

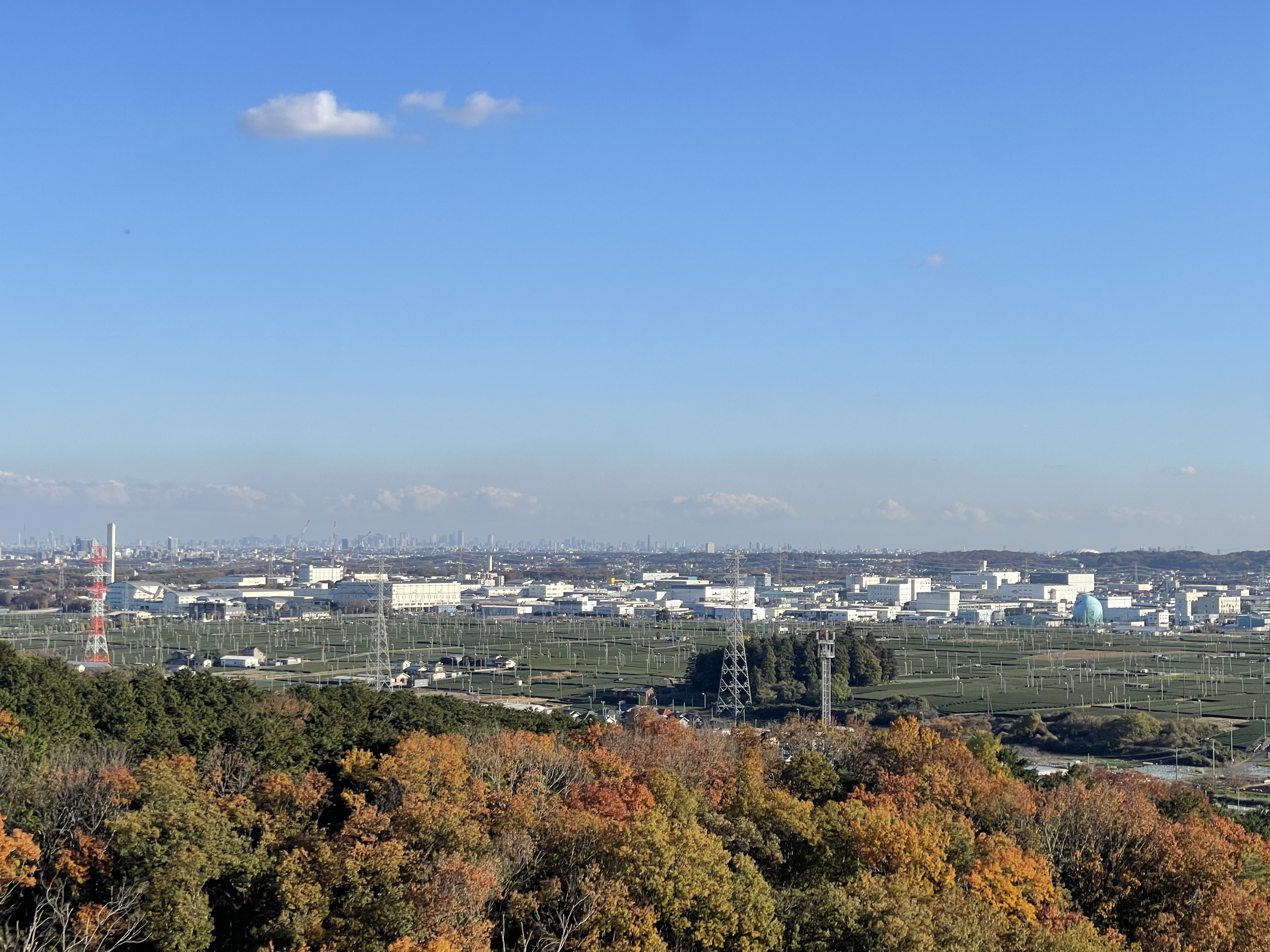
Iruma Tea Fields from Sakurayama Observatory with Tokyo in the distance

== History ==
It is known that the Japanese people started growing tea trees roughly 800 years ago when Buddhist monks who traveled to China brought back seeds. A historical document from the Nanboku-chō period, Iseiteikin’ōrai (異制庭訓往来), mentions Musashi no kawagoe (武蔵河越) as one of the best regions for tea along with Yamato no muroo (大和室尾), Iga no hattori (伊賀八鳥), Ise no kawai (伊勢河居), Suruga no seki (駿河関), and Kyoto no togano (京都栂尾). However, the production of tea was interrupted by war during the Sengoku period.

Widespread tea growing restarted in the Mid-Edo period. In 1802, a technique called Sayama Biire (狭山火入), first steaming and then roasting on the surface of washi was invented by Yoshizumi Yoshikawa (吉川温恭), Morimasa Murano (村野盛政), and Han'emon Sashida (指田半右衛門), based on the Uji roasting technique, which was deemed the best method in Japan at that time. This led to the revival of tea production in the region. In 1819 (Bunsei 2), tea leaves produced in this method started to be shipped to Edo in large amounts, receiving good reputations.

After the Meiji Restoration, tea became one of the important exporting goods. Sayama Tea was exported to North America. In 1875 (Meiji 8), a privately owned company “Sayama Corporation” started direct exports of tea to the US. Around this time, the name of Sayama Tea began to be fixed. Although the war cause the production of tea to dwindle, the production soon recovered and by the 1960s and 1970s reached its peak. At present, however, the production and the area of tea fell to nearly half of those in the 1970s.
