= Tobu 300 series =

Electric multiple unit train type operated by Tobu Railway in Japan

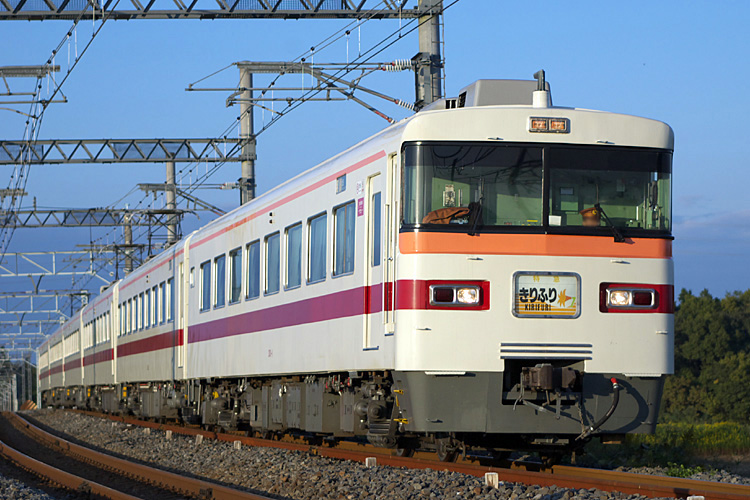
- A 300 series set on a Kirifuri service in October 2007
- In service: July 1991 – March 2022
- Constructed: 1990–1991
- Scrapped: 2017–
- Number built: 24 vehicles; 2 × 300 series (6-car); 3 × 350 series (4-car)
- Number in service: None
- Number scrapped: 12 vehicles (2 sets)
- Successor: Tobu 500 series
- Formation: 4/6 cars per trainset
- Operators: Tobu Railway
- Depots: Kasukabe
- Lines served: Tobu Skytree Line, Tobu Nikko Line, Tobu Utsunomiya Line

Specifications
- Car body construction: Steel
- Car length: 20 m (65 ft 7 in)
- Doors: One per side
- Maximum speed: 110 km/h (68 mph)
- Acceleration: 2.23 km/(h⋅s) (1.39 mph/s)
- Deceleration: 3.7 km/(h⋅s) (2.3 mph/s) (service); 5.0 km/(h⋅s) (3.1 mph/s) (emergency)
- Electric system(s): 1,500 V DC
- Current collector(s): Overhead line
- Track gauge: 1,067 mm (3 ft 6 in)

The Tobu 300 series and 350 series (東武300系・350系, Tōbu 300/350-kei) were limited express electric multiple unit (EMU) train types operated by the private railway operator Tobu Railway in Japan from July 1991 until March 2022. Rebuilt from former 1800 series express sets, the trains were used on limited express and charter services on the Tobu Skytree Line and Tobu Nikko Line.

== Operations ==
As of 21 April 2017, the fleet consisted of three four-car 350 series sets (sets 351 to 353). The 350 series sets were normally used on Shimotsuke limited express services, while the 300 series was used on Kirifuri limited express services.

== Formations ==
The six-car 300 series and four-car 350 series sets were formed as shown below.

=== 300 series sets 301 to 302 ===
Car No.	1	2	3	4	5	6
Designation	Tc2	M3	M4	M1	M2	Tc1
Numbering	300-6	300-5	300-4	300-3	300-2	300-1

Car 2 was fitted with a scissors-type pantograph, and car 4 was fitted with two.

=== 350 series sets 351 to 353 ===
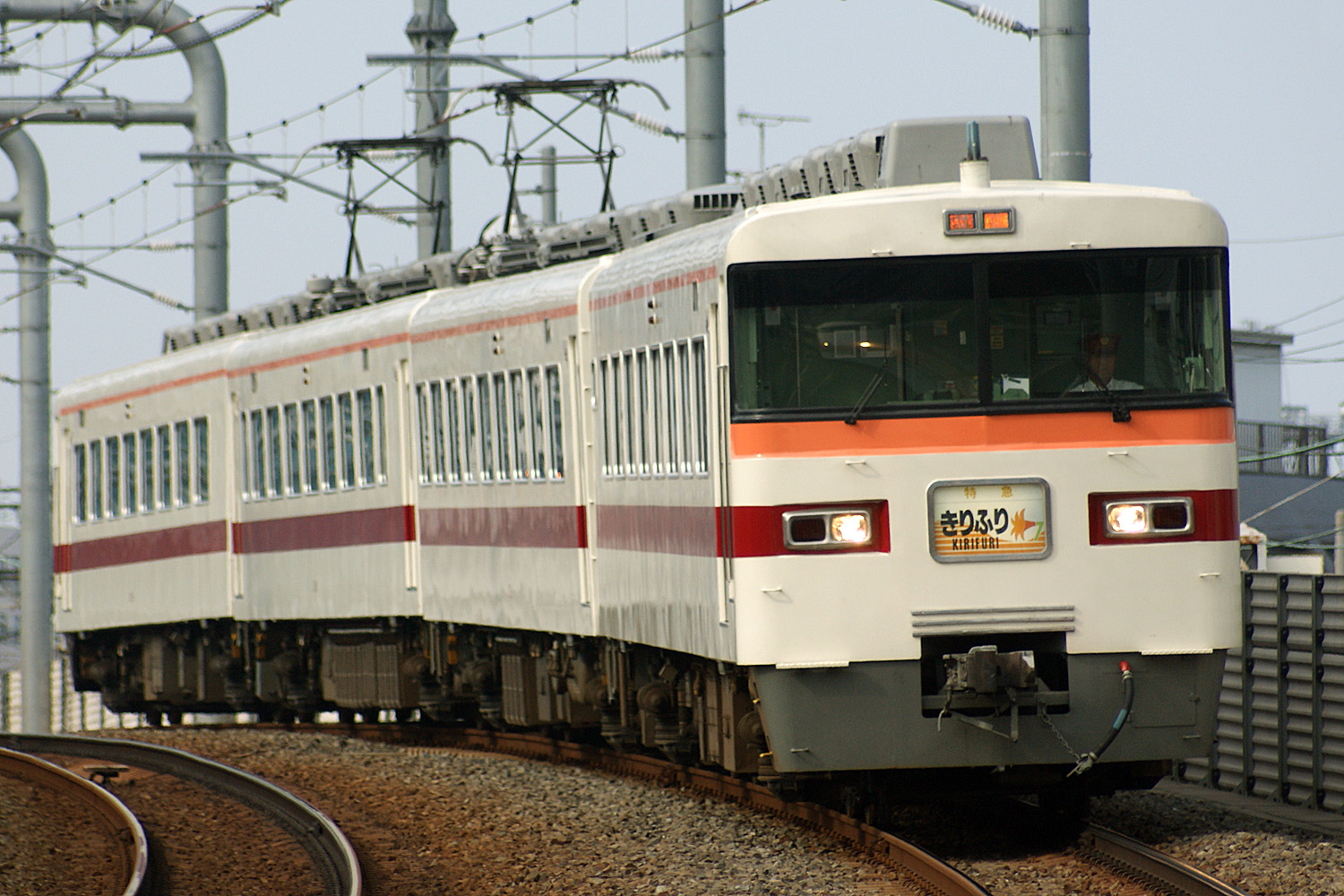
A 350 series set on a Kirifuri service in July 2008

Car No.	1	2	3	4
Designation	Tc2	M1	M2	Tc1
Numbering	350-4	350-3	350-2	350-1

Car 2 was fitted with two scissors-type pantographs.

== Interior ==
Passenger accommodation was monoclass with unidirectional rotating/reclining seats arranged with a seat pitch of 960 mm (38 in).

== History ==
Two 300 series six-car sets were built in 1990 from former 1800 series express EMUs displaced by the arrival of new 200 series EMUs. Three 350 series four-car sets were similarly rebuilt in 1991, with the trains entering service from the start of the revised timetable on 21 July 1991. The 300 series six-car sets were withdrawn on 20 April 2017, following the introduction of the Tobu 500 series. On 6 March 2022, the 350 series four-car sets were also withdrawn from service, alongside the discontinuation of Kirifuri limited express services.
