= 18O =

18O or variant, may refer to:

- Oxygen 18 (^{18}O), an isotope of oxygen with atomic mass number 18 (8 protons + 10 neutrons)
- 2019 Catalan general strike (18-O)
- 18º, a way to write the ordinal number 18th (eighteenth)

== See also ==
- δ18O
- O-18 (disambiguation) and O18
- 18 (disambiguation)
- O (disambiguation)
- 180 (one-eight-zero; 180)
- I80 (disambiguation) (i-eight-zero; I80)
- l80 (disambiguation) (L-eight-zero; l80)
