= 60i =

60i may refer to:

- Vaxell 60i, a Polish aircraft engine
- 60i, a broadcast video format

== See also ==
- Interlaced video
- 24p#60i to 24p conversions
- Deinterlacing
