= 1800 (disambiguation) =

1800 may refer to:

- 1800, events in the year 1800
- 19th century, 1801–1900
- 1800s decade, 1800–1809
- UTC+08:00, time zone

== Telecommunications ==
- GSM-1800
- 1-800; see Toll-free telephone number
  - 1800 Reverse

== Other uses ==
- 1800 Club, a skyscraper in Miami
- 1800 Tequila, an alcoholic drink
- Arc 1800, a ski resort area in France
- AMD Athlon XP 1800+, a microprocessor
- BMW 1800, a sedan a part of the New Class line of cars
- EMC 1800 hp B-B, an experimental passenger train-hauling diesel locomotive
- Morris 1800, also known as the Austin 1800, a large family car
- Nokia 1800, a mobile phone
- Pratt & Whitney X-1800, an H-block aircraft engine
- Telmac 1800, a microcomputer
- Tobu 1800 series, an express electric multiple unit train type
- Volvo P1800, a sports car
- Fiat 1800, an executive car
- 1-800-273-8255 (song), also known simply as 1-800

== See also ==
- 180° (disambiguation)
- 180
