= L80 =

L80, l-80, or, variation, may refer to:

- Roy Williams Airport (FAA LID: L80), in Joshua Tree, California, U.S.
- HMIS Hindustan (L80), a ship
- Volkswagen L80, a truck
- Valmet L-80 Turbo-Vinha, a Finnish military trainer aircraft
- LG L80 Dual, a smartphone running Optimus UI

== See also ==
- L (disambiguation)
- 80 (disambiguation)
- I80 (disambiguation) (i-eight-zero; I80)
- 180 (one-eight-zero; 180)
- 18O (disambiguation) (one-eight-o; 18o)
