= Limited express =

Type of train service

In public transport, a limited express is a special express train or bus service that makes fewer stops (hence “limited”) than local, limited-stop, and regular express services along the same corridor. Limited expresses are typically the most direct service on a line, serving only major destinations such as central and interchange stations, making them the fastest option for inter-city travelers.

== Japan ==
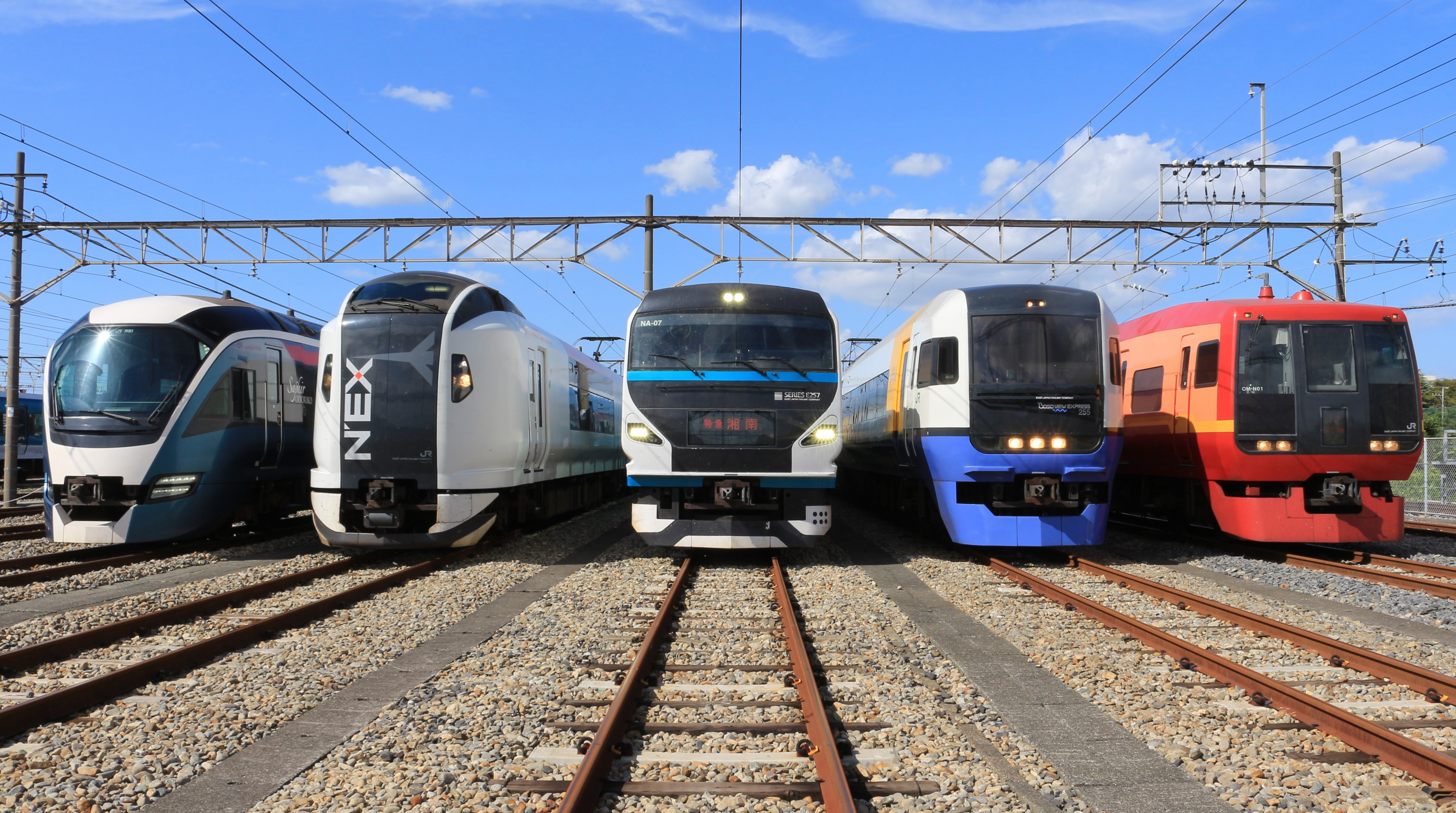
JR East limited express trains, including the Saphir Odoriko, Narita Express (N'EX), Odoriko.

The term "limited express" is a common translation of the Japanese compound noun tokubetsu kyūkō (特別急行); lit. 'special express', most often abbreviated tokkyū (特急), although some operators translate the word differently.

Limited express trains can be categorized into two types, intercity and commuter, although railway companies rarely formalize this distinction. The former type of trains generally use long-distance coaches, better equipped than other ordinary express trains, and may include reserved seating, dining cars, food and beverage cars, and "green cars" (first-class cars). The latter type usually incurs no surcharge, but seating tends to be first-come, first-served, as this type of train uses commuter train coaches. Both types of trains travel faster and stop at fewer stations than "express" (急行 kyūkō) or "local" (普通 futsū or 各駅停車 kaku-eki teisha) services.

Until 1972, the Hikari on the Tōkaidō Shinkansen was officially a chōtokkyū (超特急) "super express" (lit. 'beyond limited express') and was priced higher than the Kodama, the limited express service on the same line. Presently, all Shinkansen services are officially limited expresses, but are referred to as "super express" in English.

The table below summarizes limited express services on major Japanese railways (Japan Railways Group companies, Toei Transport, and the 16 major private railways, minus Tokyo Metro which does not operate limited express trains).

Limited express services on major railways in Japan
Region	Railway	Train type		Surcharge	Picture (example)	Note
Region	Railway	English	Japanese	Surcharge	Picture (example)	Note
Nationwide	JR Group companies	Limited Express	Tokkyū	Yes		Lists of services can be found at: Hokkaido Railway Company#Limited Express; East Japan Railway Company#Limited express (daytime); Central Japan Railway Company#Named train services; West Japan Railway Company#Named train services; Shikoku Railway Company#Train services; Kyushu Railway Company#Limited express and tourist train services
Nationwide	JR Group companies	Commuter Express	Tsūkin Tokkyū (JR West only)	Yes		Lists of services can be found at: Hokkaido Railway Company#Limited Express; East Japan Railway Company#Limited express (daytime); Central Japan Railway Company#Named train services; West Japan Railway Company#Named train services; Shikoku Railway Company#Train services; Kyushu Railway Company#Limited express and tourist train services
Kantō	Toei	Airport Limited Express	Eapōto Kaitoku	No		These services operate on the Toei Asakusa Line. Only the Airport Limited Express makes limited stops on the Toei Asakusa Line, while others stop at every station but indicate through service into either Keisei or Keikyu Lines.
Kantō	Toei	Limited Express	Kaitoku, Kaisoku Tokkyū, Tokkyū	No		These services operate on the Toei Asakusa Line. Only the Airport Limited Express makes limited stops on the Toei Asakusa Line, while others stop at every station but indicate through service into either Keisei or Keikyu Lines.
Kantō	Toei	Access Express	Akusesu Tokkyū	No		These services operate on the Toei Asakusa Line. Only the Airport Limited Express makes limited stops on the Toei Asakusa Line, while others stop at every station but indicate through service into either Keisei or Keikyu Lines.
Kantō	Toei	Commuter Express	Tsūkin Tokkyū	No		These services operate on the Toei Asakusa Line. Only the Airport Limited Express makes limited stops on the Toei Asakusa Line, while others stop at every station but indicate through service into either Keisei or Keikyu Lines.
Kantō	Tobu	Limited Express	Tokkyū	Yes		Branded with the names SPACIA (Tobu 100 series), SPACIA X (Tobu N100 series), Revaty (Tobu 500 series), and RYOMO (Tobu 200 series). Limited express services with no surcharge on the Tōbu Tōjō Line were discontinued in June 2008.
Kantō	Seibu	Limited Express	Tokkyū	Yes		Branded as Laview (Seibu 001 series).
Kantō	Keisei	Limited Express	Kaisoku Tokkyū, Tokkyū	No		Skyliner, Morningliner, Eveningliner and Cityliner limited express services are classed higher than conventional limited express trains and are charged.
Kantō	Keisei	Access Express	Akusesu Tokkyū	No		Skyliner, Morningliner, Eveningliner and Cityliner limited express services are classed higher than conventional limited express trains and are charged.
Kantō	Keisei	Commuter Express	Tsūkin Tokkyū	No		Skyliner, Morningliner, Eveningliner and Cityliner limited express services are classed higher than conventional limited express trains and are charged.
Kantō	Keio	Special Express	Tokkyū	No		The Keio Liner is classed higher than Special Express and are charged. "Semi Special-Express" (Juntokkyū) services were discontinued in 2021.
Kantō	Odakyu	Limited Express	Tokkyū	Yes		Branded as Romancecar. Some limited express services operate on the Tokyo Metro network, which operate no limited express services of their own.
Kantō	Tokyu	Limited Express	Tokkyū	No		S-Train services from Seibu Railway, which are classed higher than Tokyu limited express services and are charged, operate on Tokyu's Tōyoko Line.
Kantō	Tokyu	Commuter Limited Express, Commuter Express	Tsūkin Tokkyū	No		S-Train services from Seibu Railway, which are classed higher than Tokyu limited express services and are charged, operate on Tokyu's Tōyoko Line.
Kantō	Keikyu	Limited Express	Kaitoku, Tokkyū	No		Keikyu Wing and Morning Wing services are classed higher than limited express and are charged.
Kantō	Keikyu	Airport Limited Express	Eapōto Kaitoku	No		Keikyu Wing and Morning Wing services are classed higher than limited express and are charged.
Kantō	Sōtetsu (Sagami Railway)	Limited Express	Tokkyū	No		
Chūbu	Meitetsu (Nagoya Railroad)	μSKY Limited Express	Myū-Sukai	Yes		Trains consist of first-class cars (charged) only.
Chūbu	Meitetsu (Nagoya Railroad)	Rapid Limited Express	Kaisoku Tokkyū	Partially		Some cars are charged.
Chūbu	Meitetsu (Nagoya Railroad)	Limited Express	Tokkyū	Partially		Some cars are charged.
Kansai, Chūbu	Kintetsu	Limited Express	Tokkyū	Yes		Some trains, like the Hinotori (Kintetsu 80000 series), require an additional "premium car" fare on top of the charged express fare.
Kansai, Chūbu	Kintetsu	Sightseeing Limited Express	Kankō Tokkyū	Yes		Designation for trains branded AONIYOSHI (Kintetsu 12200 series), Shimakaze (Kintetsu 50000 series), and Blue Symphony (Kintetsu 16200 series).
Kansai	Nankai	Limited Express	Tokkyū	Some trains		Rapi:t, Koya, Rinkan, and Senboku Liner services consist of reserved seat cars (charged) only.
Kansai	Keihan	Limited Express	Tokkyū,Kaisoku Tokkyū	No		As of August 2017, one first-class car (called Premium Car) is present on all Limited Express services.
Kansai	Keihan	Liner	Liner	Yes		As of August 2017, one first-class car (called Premium Car) is present on all Limited Express services.
Kansai	Hankyu	Limited Express	Tokkyū	No		"Semi-Limited Express" (Juntokkyū) services also operate.
Kansai	Hankyu	Commuter Limited Express	Tsūkin Tokkyū	No		"Semi-Limited Express" (Juntokkyū) services also operate.
Kansai	Hankyu	Rapid Limited Express	Kaisoku Tokkyū	No		"Semi-Limited Express" (Juntokkyū) services also operate.
Kansai	Hankyu	Rapid Limited Express A	Kaisoku Tokkyū A	No		"Semi-Limited Express" (Juntokkyū) services also operate.
Kansai	Hanshin	Limited Express	Tokkyū, Chokutsū Tokkyū, Kukan Tokkyū,	No		
Kyushu	Nishitetsu (Nishi-Nippon Railroad)	Limited Express	Tokkyū	No		

== Australia ==
In Australia, particularly in Melbourne, selective commuter trains often skip smaller stations during peak hours, primarily for the purpose of more efficient delivery of passengers to interchange stations, or higher-patronage stations. However, generally limited express trains only skip a small number of stations while express trains run non-stop on a large section of the line, contrary to Japan's definition; these trains are more properly limited-stop services. In Brisbane, and Sydney, limited stop services are formed by commuter trains that run as limited stops or express services from the city centre to the edge of the suburban area and then as all stops in the interurban area (an example of such an express pattern can be seen on the Gold Coast line).

== New Zealand ==
In the era of steam-hauled provincial expresses, limited express services were common on high traffic routes. The Night Limited was the premier express train on the North Island Main Trunk Railway between Auckland, and Wellington from 1924 until 1971; during peak seasons, it was augmented by the Daylight Limited. Following the Night Limited was a slower unnamed express that stopped at more stations and provided a lower level of comfort.

A different pattern was employed on the Main South Line. The South Island Limited express ran three days a week from Christchurch through Dunedin to Invercargill, with a slower regular express operating on the other four days. Both regular and limited expresses were augmented by additional services between intermediate destinations, such as an evening railcar between Christchurch and Dunedin operated by NZR's 88 seater, or Vulcan Class Railmotors.

Limited expresses were rare beyond the main trunk routes and the regular provincial expresses were typically augmented with even slower mixed trains. However, when the Rotorua Express schedule was accelerated in 1930 and its carriages upgraded, it was re-branded as the Rotorua Limited. Due to the Great Depression and rising car ownership levels, it did not achieve the level of success intended, thus in 1937 it reverted to the status and service pattern of a regular express.

After the demise of the Night Limited and the South Island Limited in 1971, the term "limited express" fell into disuse in New Zealand and has not been applied to any subsequent trains. However, from 1971 to 1979, the Silver Star performed the role of a limited express as it operated to a faster schedule than a supplementary slower service that was known from 1975 as the Northerner.

As of 13 March 2017, Auckland Transport introduced limited express services on the Onehunga Line. These services operate until 7:30 pm on weekdays, bypassing Parnell, Remuera and Greenlane stations.

== Philippines ==
There were trains under the Manila Railroad Company and the Philippine National Railways that were called "Limited Express" or simply "Limited", as well as Special and Express trains that nonetheless stopped at fewer stations. The first of such services were introduced in the 1950s and peaked in the 1970s. They only stop at major stations along the two intercity main lines in Luzon unlike regular expresses. They were given the highest priority, dedicated rolling stock, and the highest level of comfort and amenities.

The North Main Line had the Ilocos Special and the Amianan Night Express that ran between 1973 and 1984, then the fastest services in the PNR and stopped at fewer stations compared to the Dagupan Express. Meanwhile, the second Bicol Express, opened in 1954, only stopped at 8 out of 66 stations of the line between Tutuban station in downtown Manila and Legazpi station in Albay. Other examples on the South Main Line include the Peñafrancia Express, the Isarog/Manila Limited, and the Mayon Limited, all of these were defunct by 2013 when all intercity rail was discontinued in favour of building a new line.

There are plans to revive the "limited express" trains. The North–South Commuter Railway and the new South Main Line under the South Long Haul project will both feature "limited express" services. Both limited expresses will run on standard-gauge track and will use dedicated rolling stock capable of running at speeds of up to 160 kilometers per hour (99 mph) or higher-speed rail. For the North–South Commuter Railway (NSCR), an airport express train will connect Clark International Airport with Alabang station in Muntinlupa, skipping all the other stations in Central Luzon and only stopping at four other stations in Metro Manila. In comparison, the "Commuter Express" services on the NSCR will serve more stations but will use the same electric multiple units as the regular commuter service.

To the south of the NSCR, the Bicol Express flagship service of the PNR South Long Haul was originally proposed as a limited express service in 2018. However, a new basic design report released in June 2021 reclassified the services into two groups: Local and Express. The new Bicol Express service has since been relegated to a regular express train service.

== United States ==
Some of the most elite trains in the United States in the twentieth century were called "limited", a name that typically graced overnight trains that made very few stops. (However, the fastest train between New York and Washington, DC, a day train, in the Pennsylvania Railroad era was called the Congressional Limited Express, and it had few stops, like the longer distance "Limiteds".)

Some limiteds of America have included:

- the Chicago, Milwaukee & St Paul Railway's Pioneer Limited - one of the first and longest running named trains in the country
- the New York Central Railroad's 20th Century Limited and its Amtrak successor, the Lake Shore Limited
- the Pennsylvania Railroad's (and later, Amtrak) Broadway Limited
- the New Haven's (and later, Amtrak) Merchants Limited
- the Baltimore and Ohio Railroad's National Limited
- the Rock Island Rail Road's and the Southern Pacific Railroad's Golden State Limited
- the Santa Fe Railroad's Super Chief
- the Union Pacific Railroad's City of Los Angeles
- the Southern Pacific Railroad's Sunset Limited
- the B&O's Capitol Limited

From September 23, 1978, to April 15, 1990, the New York City Subway operated a limited express premium-fare subway service from Manhattan to JFK, which was called the JFK Express. The subway service made express stops at subway stations in Manhattan and one subway station in Brooklyn, before running nonstop to Howard Beach-JFK Airport, where transfers to free airport shuttle buses were provided. The JFK Express proved to be unsuccessful, seeing low ridership in part because the service did not actually serve any airline terminals.

Some commuter railroads operate express trains making limited stops. The Long Island Rail Road operates some rush hour trains that run 50 miles between the central city station and the first stop of its express route itinerary, for instance, on the Ronkonkoma Line. The Metro-North Railroad runs some rush hour trains that run 29 miles between the central city and the first stop of their route itinerary on the Hudson Line and the New Haven Line.

Due to the wide availability of service on the Northeast Regional and Acela Express, most of Amtrak's medium- and long-distance trains operating along the Northeast Corridor only stop to discharge passengers from Washington Union Station (or in some cases, Alexandria Union Station) northward, and to receive passengers from Newark Penn Station southward.

== South Korea ==
The term "Limited Express" is 특급 (特急, Teukgeup) in Korean. Limited express trains stop at fewer stations than regular express trains (급행, 急行, Geuphaeng).

Limited express on major railways in South Korea
Railway	Train type		Surcharge	Picture (example)	Line	Section
Railway	English	Korean	Surcharge	Picture (example)	Line	Section
Korail	Limited Express	특급(特急) (Teukgeup)	No		Seoul Subway Line 1 (Gyeongin Line)	Yongsan ~ Dongincheon
Korail	ITX-Cheongchun	ITX-청춘(靑春) (ITX-Cheongchun)	Yes		Gyeongchun Line	Yongsan ~ Chuncheon
Seoul Metro	Limited Express	급행(急行) (Geuphaeng)	No		Seoul Subway Line 9	Gimpo International Airport ~ VHS Medical Center

== Indonesia ==
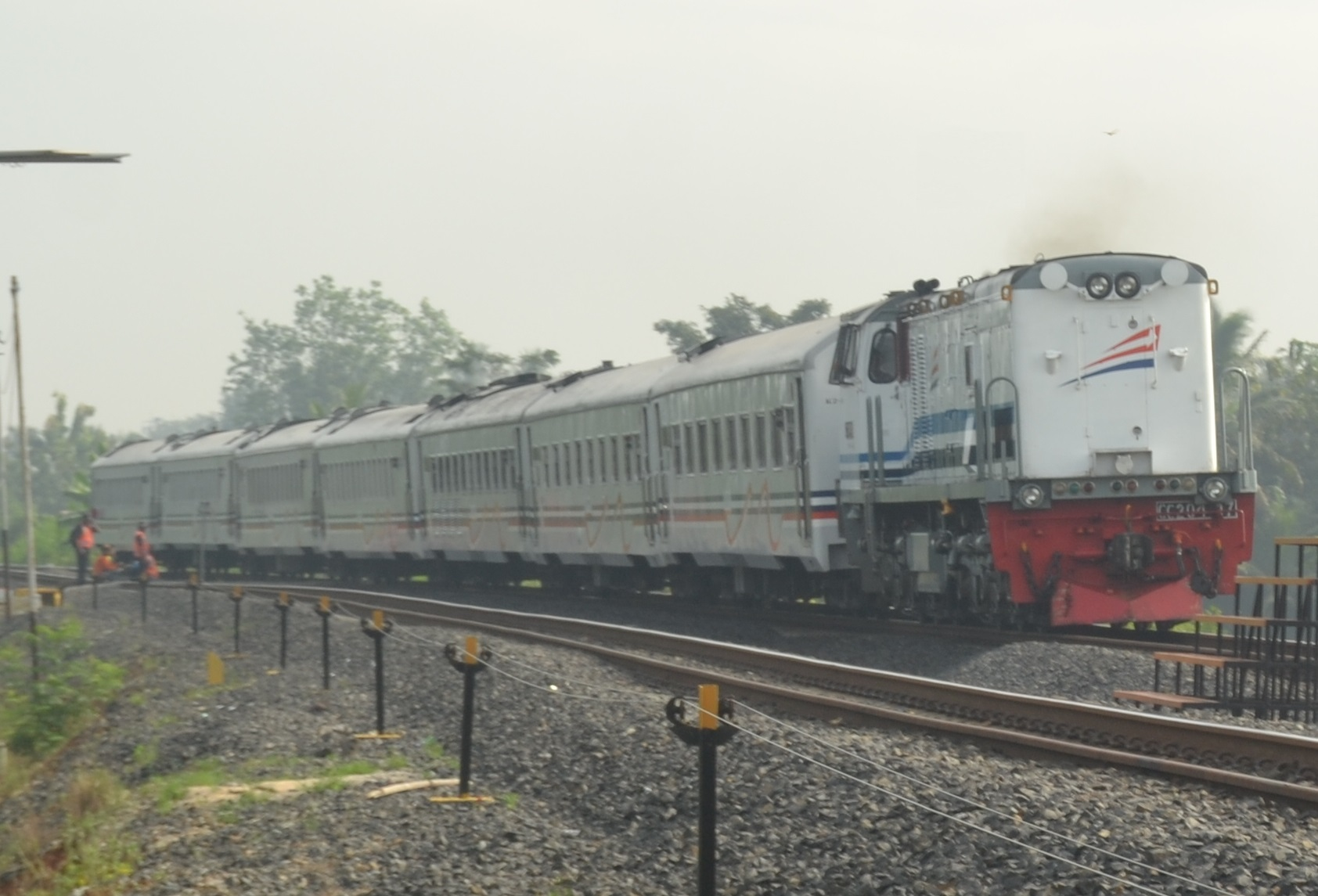
LimexonBranti

The Sriwijaya train (or also known as the Sriwijaya Limited Express (Limex) train, which means the Sriwijaya Limited Express (Patas) train) is a passenger train service operated by PT Kereta Api Indonesia to serve the Palembang Kertapati-Tanjungkarang line and vice versa.

== See also ==
- Limited-stop
- Z-series trains
