= NS18 =

NS18, NS 18, NS-18, NS.18, or variation, may refer to:

== Places ==
- Braddell MRT station (station code NS18), Toa Payoh, Singapore; a mass transit station
- Preston-Dartmouth (constituency N.S. 18), Nova Scotia, Canada; a provincial electoral district
- Sipaliwini District (FIPS region code NS18), Suriname

== Other uses ==
- SOR NS 18, a low-floor articulated single-level bus from SOR
- Blue Origin NS-18, a suborbital space tourism flight on 2021 October 12 from Blue Origin

== See also ==
- NS (disambiguation)
- 18 (disambiguation)
