= 180 =

180 may refer to:

- AD 180
- 180 BC
- 180 (number)
- 180 AM, an AM radio frequency
- 180 (video game), a 1986 darts video game
- 180 (2011 American film)
- 180 (2011 Indian film)
- 180 (2026 South African film)
- 180 (album), a 2013 album by Palma Violets
- One Eighty, a 1980 album by Ambrosia
- The 180, a 2013–2017 Canadian radio talk show
- U-turn or 180
- 180, a trick in extreme sports in which a rider rotates half a turn while airborne and lands

== See also ==
- 180° (disambiguation)
- List of highways numbered 180
- Flight 180, an alternate name for Final Destination (2000)
- 18O (disambiguation) (one-eight-o; 18o)
- l80 (disambiguation) (L-eight-zero; l80)
- I80 (disambiguation) (i-eight-zero; I80)
