= Vaxell =

Polish aircraft engine manufacturer

Vaxell Sp. z o.o.
- Company type: Spółka z ograniczoną odpowiedzialnością
- Industry: Aerospace
- Headquarters: Bydgoszcz, Poland
- Products: Aircraft engines
- Website: vaxell.com

Vaxell Sp. z o.o. is a Polish aircraft engine manufacturer based in Bydgoszcz. The company specializes in the design and manufacture of engines for ultralight and homebuilt aircraft.

The company is a Spółka z ograniczoną odpowiedzialnością, a Polish limited liability company.

In the mid-2000s the company developed a range of four-cylinder, air-cooled, four-stroke, horizontally opposed engines, including the 60 hp (45 kW) Vaxell 60i, the 80 hp (60 kW) Vaxell 80i and the 90 hp (67 kW) Vaxell 100i.

== Aircraft engines ==
Summary of engines built by Vaxell:

- Vaxell 60i
- Vaxell 80i
- Vaxell 100i
