= 180° =

180° may refer to:

- 180 degrees, the arc of a semicircle
- 180° (film), a 2010 Mexican comedy-drama film
- 180°, an album by Gerardo (musician), 2004
- 180 Degree (MC Mong album), 2004
- "180 Degrees", a song by NOFX from So Long and Thanks for All the Shoes, 1997
- U-turn or 180 degree turn

== See also ==
- 180
- 180-degree rule
- 180 Degrees South: Conquerors of the Useless, a documentary
- 180th meridian
- Reverse (disambiguation)
- 1800 (disambiguation)
