= 018 =

018 may refer to:

- Air Canada Flight 018, an airline flight from Hong Kong to Vancouver, Canada, illegally boarded by a Chinese man wearing a disguise in 2010
- Area code 018, a telephone area code in Uppsala, Sweden
- BMW 018, an experimental turbojet engine produced in Germany during the Second World War 1940–1944
- Tyrrell 018, a Formula One racing car 1989–1990
- Xfone 018, a cellular telephone and internet service company in Israel founded in 2000
  - 018, the international call prefix for Xfone 018 in telephone numbers in Israel
- Aerolínea Lanhsa Flight 018, which suffered a runway excursion on takeoff

== See also ==
- O18 (disambiguation) (using the letter 'O' rather than a zero)
- 18 (disambiguation)
