= O18 =

O18 or O-18 may refer to:

== Places ==
=== Airports ===
- Hanford Municipal Airport, in California, United States; formerly assigned FAA LID O18
- Buzzards Roost Airport (FAA LID O18), Inola, Oklahoma, USA; see List of airports in Oklahoma

=== Rail stations ===
- Tondabayashi Station (station code O18), Tondabayashi, Osaka Prefecture, Japan
- Xinzhuang metro station (station code O18), Xinzhuang District, New Taipei, Taiwan

== Literature ==
- Naos (hieroglyph) (Gardiner code O18), an Egyptian hieroglyphic representing a shrine
- Minuscule 442 (Soden code O^{18}), a Greek New Testament minuscule manuscript
- Minuscule 441 (Soden code O^{18}), a Greek New Testament minuscule manuscript

== Other uses ==
- Curtiss O-18 Falcon, an observation aircraft of the United States Army Air Corps
- Oxygen-18, an isotope of oxygen
- Delta-O-18, a measure of the ratio of stable isotopes 18O:16O (oxygen-18:oxygen-16)
- MSC(O)-18, minesweeper built for the United States Navy during World War II
- over age 18 (O18), an age grouping, such as found in sports

== See also ==
- Canadian National Class O-18-a steam locomotives
- 018 (disambiguation) (zero-one-eight)
- 18O (disambiguation)
- 18 (disambiguation)
- O (disambiguation)
- U18 (disambiguation)
