= Tobu 500 series =

Japanese electric multiple unit train type

Tobu 500 series Revaty
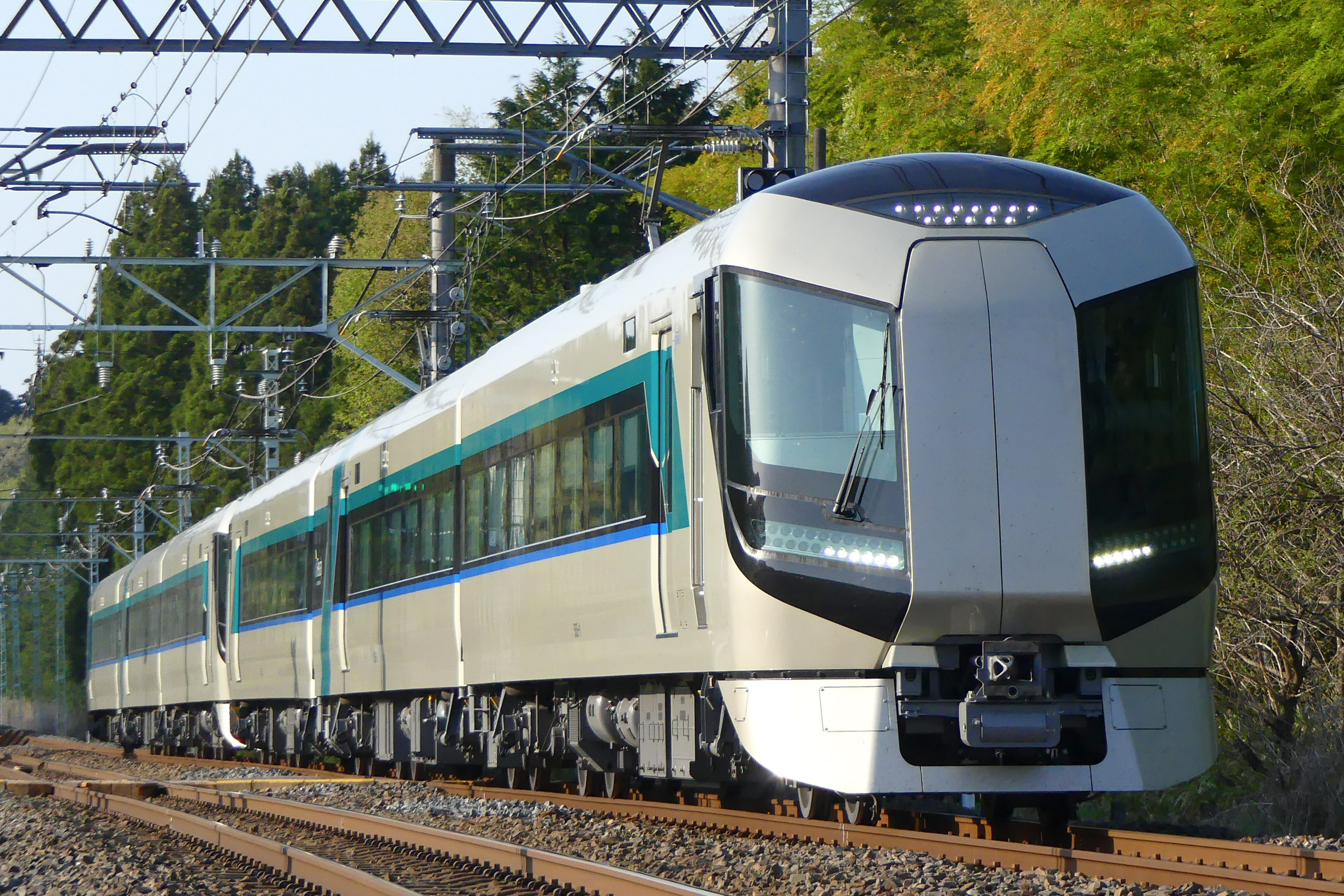
- A 500 series EMU in April 2017
- In service: 2017–present
- Manufacturer: Kawasaki Heavy Industries
- Built at: Kobe, Hyogo
- Replaced: 300 series
- Constructed: 2016–
- Entered service: 21 April 2017
- Number built: 33 vehicles (11 sets) as of September 2020
- Number in service: 24 vehicles (8 sets)
- Formation: 3 cars per trainset
- Capacity: 161
- Operator: Tobu Railway
- Lines served: Tobu Skytree Line, Tobu Urban Park Line, Tobu Isesaki Line, Tobu Nikko Line, Tobu Utsunomiya Line, Yagan Railway Aizu Kinugawa Line, Aizu Railway Aizu Line

Specifications
- Car body construction: Aluminium
- Car length: 20,000 mm (65 ft 7 in)
- Width: 2,870 mm (9 ft 5 in)
- Height: 4,035 mm (13 ft 2.9 in)
- Doors: 1 sliding door per side
- Maximum speed: 120 km/h (75 mph) (service); 130 km/h (81 mph) (design)
- Traction system: TM-16 (190 kW) × 8 per set
- Power output: 1.52 MW (2,038 hp) per set
- Acceleration: 2.3 km/(h⋅s) (1.4 mph/s)
- Deceleration: 3.7 km/(h⋅s) (2.3 mph/s) (service); 5.3 km/(h⋅s) (3.3 mph/s) (emergency)
- Electric system: 1,500 V DC
- Current collection: Overhead line
- Safety system: TST-ATS
- Track gauge: 1,067 mm (3 ft 6 in)

The Tobu 500 series (東武500系, Tōbu 500-kei), branded Revaty (リバティ), is an electric multiple unit (EMU) train type operated by the private railway operator Tobu Railway on limited express services in Japan since 21 April 2017. As of September 2020, 11 three-car sets (33 vehicles in total) have been built by Kawasaki Heavy Industries.

== Design ==
The trains were built by Kawasaki Heavy Industries, with exterior and interior styling overseen by Japanese industrial designer Ken Okuyama. The driving cabs at each end of the three-car trainsets includes an automatically extending gangway connection to allow trains to be coupled or split en route.

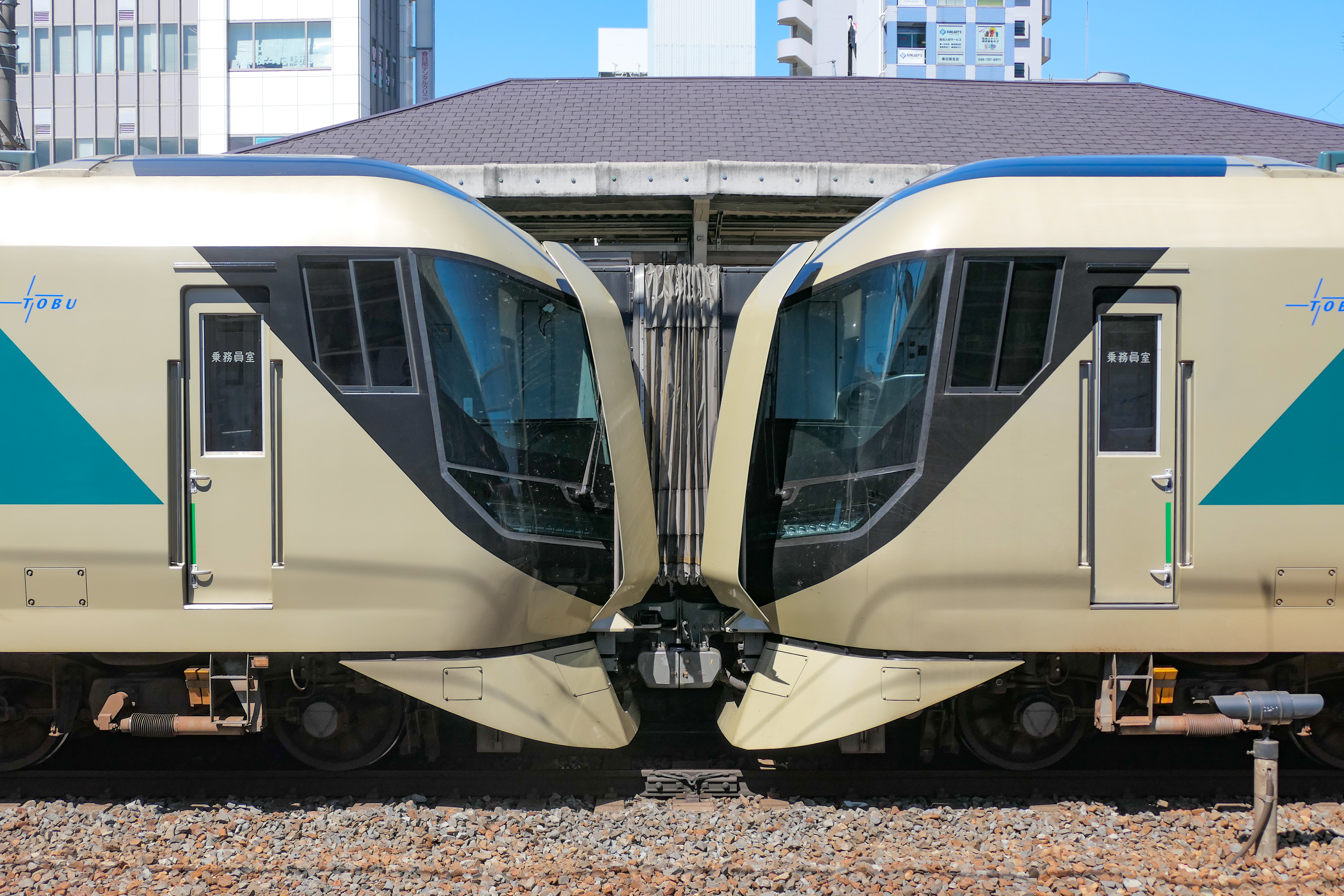
The gangway connection between two coupled units

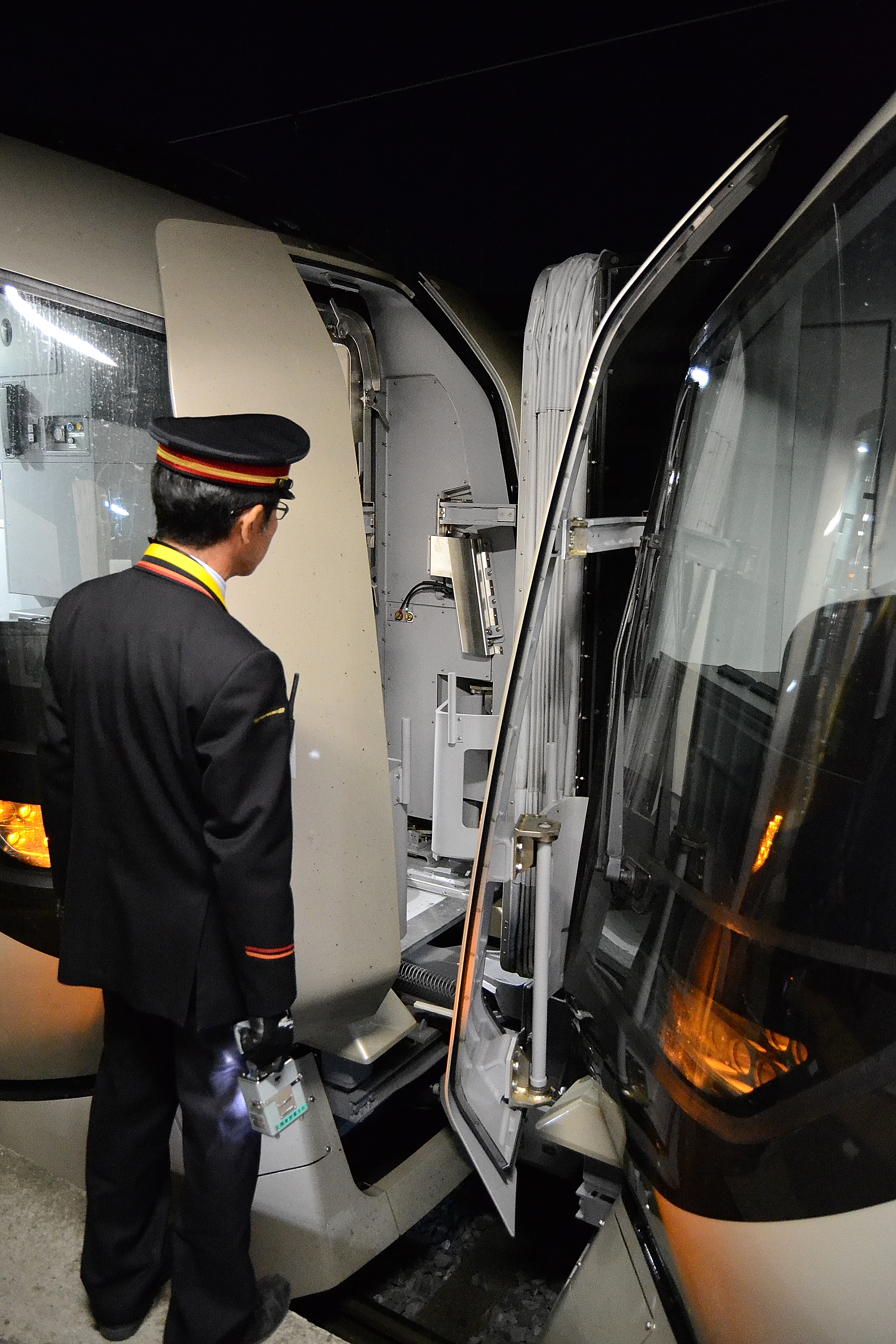
Two units being coupled en route in May 2017

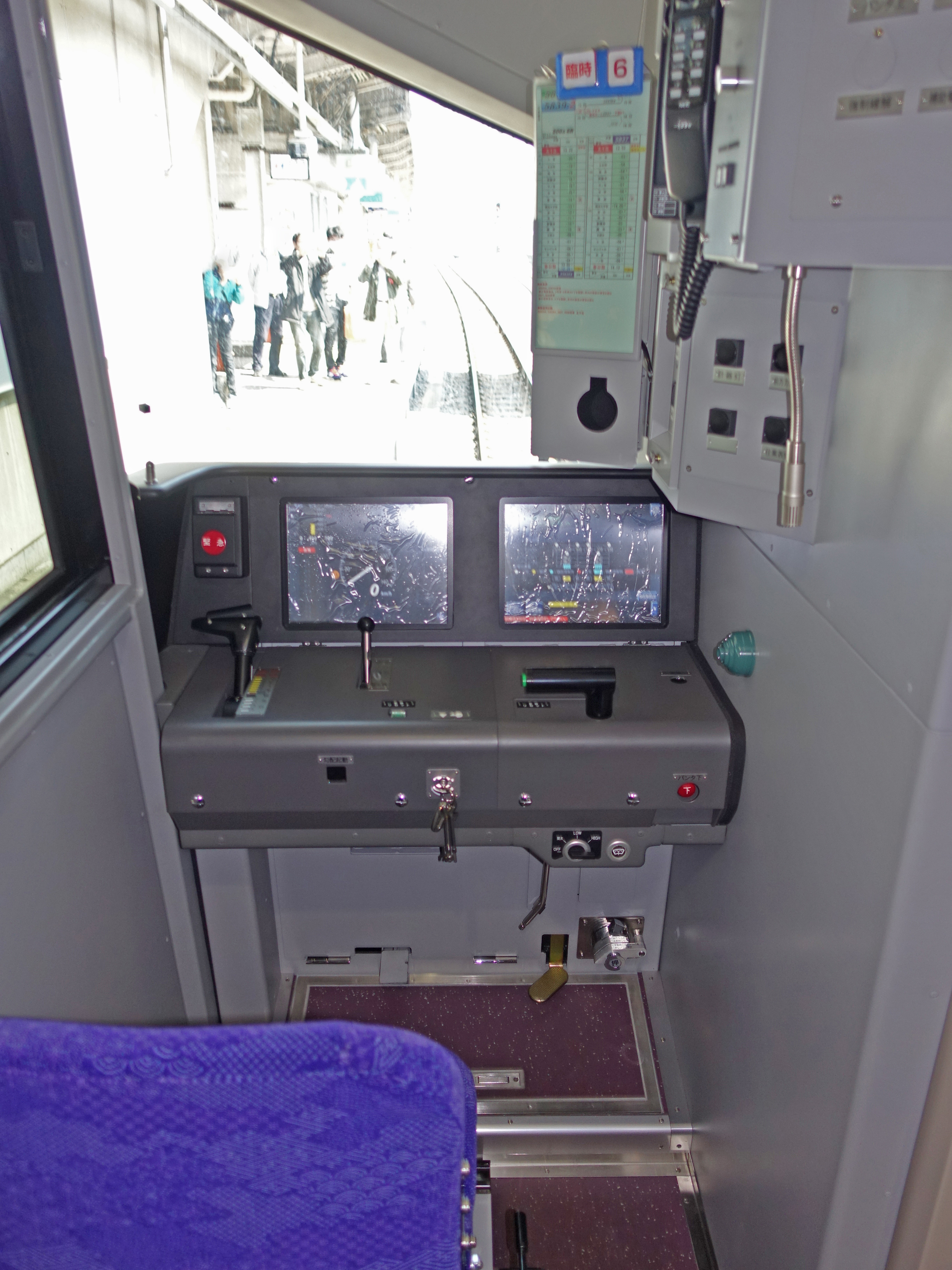
Interior of the driving cab

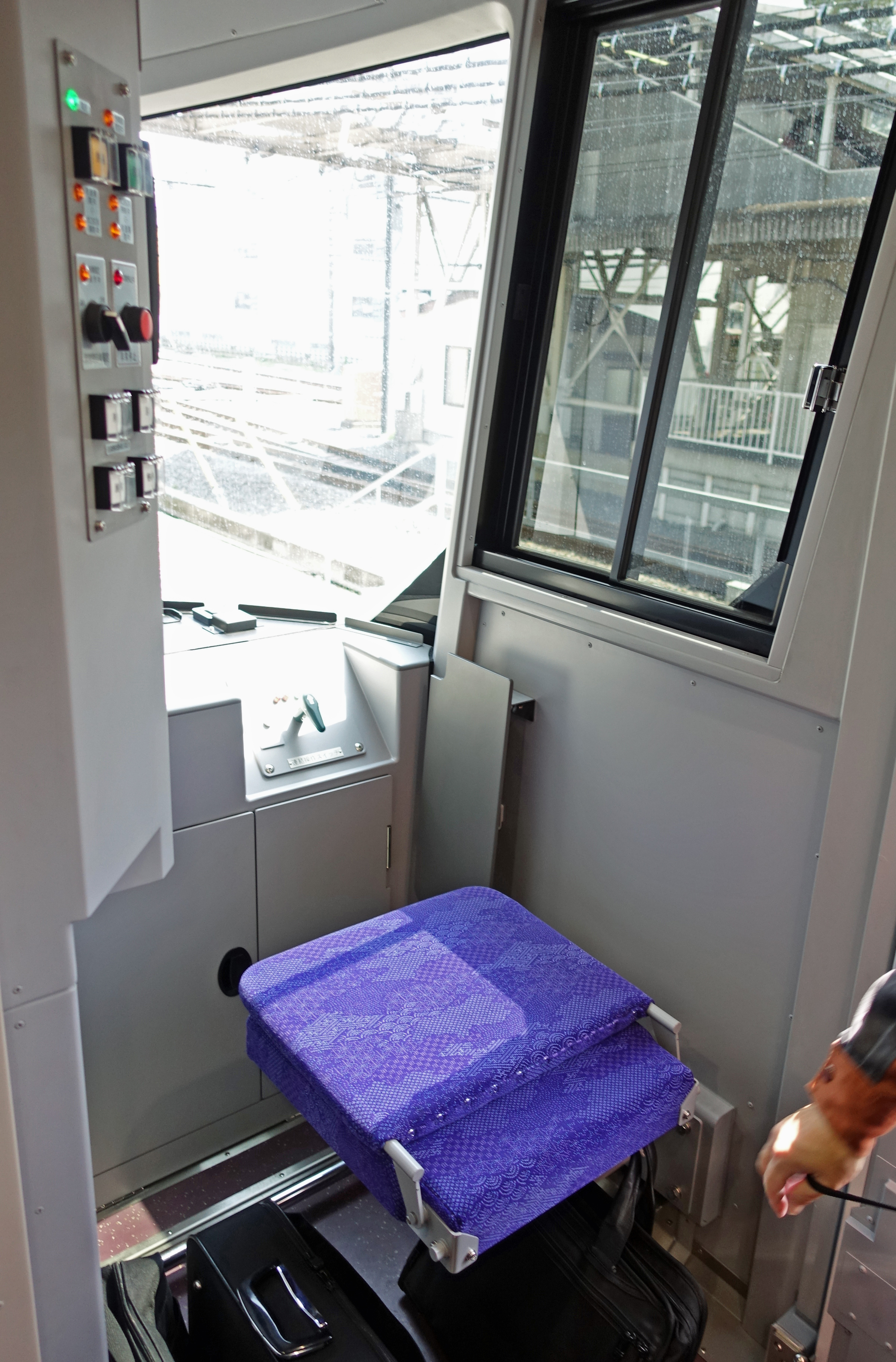
Interior of the right-hand side cab

The trains have active suspension, a first for trains operated by Tobu, and use permanent-magnet synchronous motor (PMSM) traction motors.

=== Naming ===
The trains are branded Revaty (リバティ), a name derived from the English words "Variety" and "Liberty".

== Operations ==
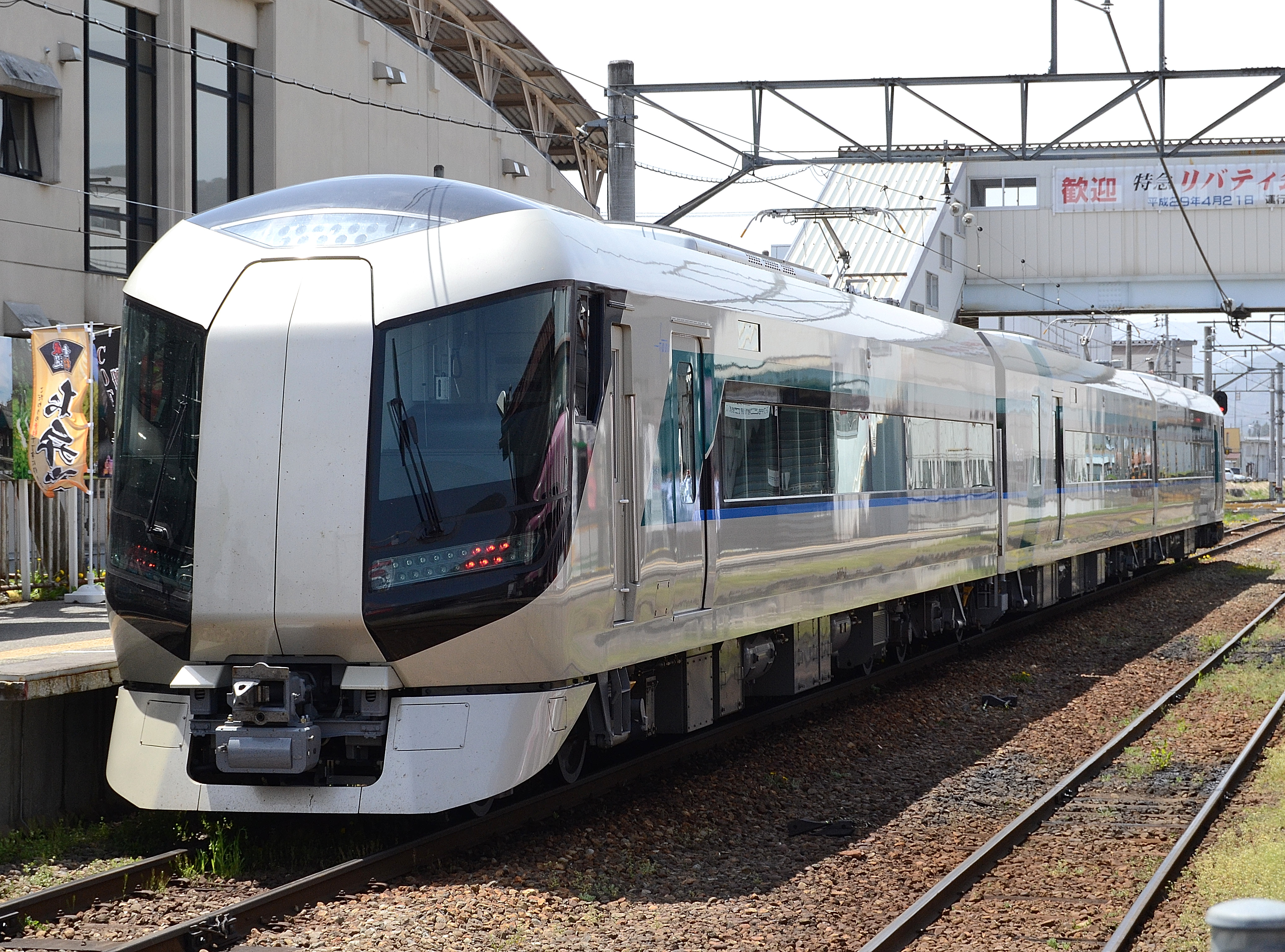
A three-car set on the Aizu Railway Aizu Line on a Revaty Aizu service in May 2017

As of 21 April 2017, the trains are used on the following services.

Service name	Between	Line(s) used
Revaty Kegon	Asakusa - Tobu Nikko	Tobu Skytree Line - Tobu Nikko Line
Revaty Kinu	Asakusa - Shin-Fujiwara	Tobu Skytree Line - Tobu Nikko Line - Tobu Kinugawa Line
Revaty Aizu	Asakusa - Aizu-Tajima	Tobu Skytree Line - Tobu Nikko Line - Tobu Kinugawa Line - Yagan Railway Aizu Kinugawa Line - Aizu Railway Aizu Line
Revaty Ryomo	Asakusa - Tatebayashi	Tobu Skytree Line - Tobu Isesaki Line
Skytree Liner	Asakusa - Kasukabe	Tobu Skytree Line
Urban Park Liner	Asakusa - Omiya/Nodashi	Tobu Skytree Line - Tobu Urban Park Line
Urban Park Liner	Omiya - Unga	Tobu Urban Park Line

== Exterior ==
The exterior livery consists of "champagne beige" with "forest green" and "future blue" (Tobu's corporate colour) highlights around the windows.

== Formation ==
The fleet of three-car sets are formed as follows, with two driving motor ("M") cars and a non-powered trailer ("T") intermediate car.

Designation	Mc1	T	Mc2
Numbering	MoHa 50x-1	SaHa 50x-2	MoHa 50x-3
Capacity (seated/total)	56/112	87/136	56/112
Weight (t)	40.5	35.1	40.4

The two motored cars each have one single-arm pantograph.

== Interior ==
Each three-car set has a seating capacity of 161 passengers. Seat pitch is 1,000 mm (39 in). Interior lighting is LED lighting. Wi-Fi and at-seat AC power sockets are provided.

The automated on-board passenger announcements use the voice of TV presenter Tomomi Kuno.

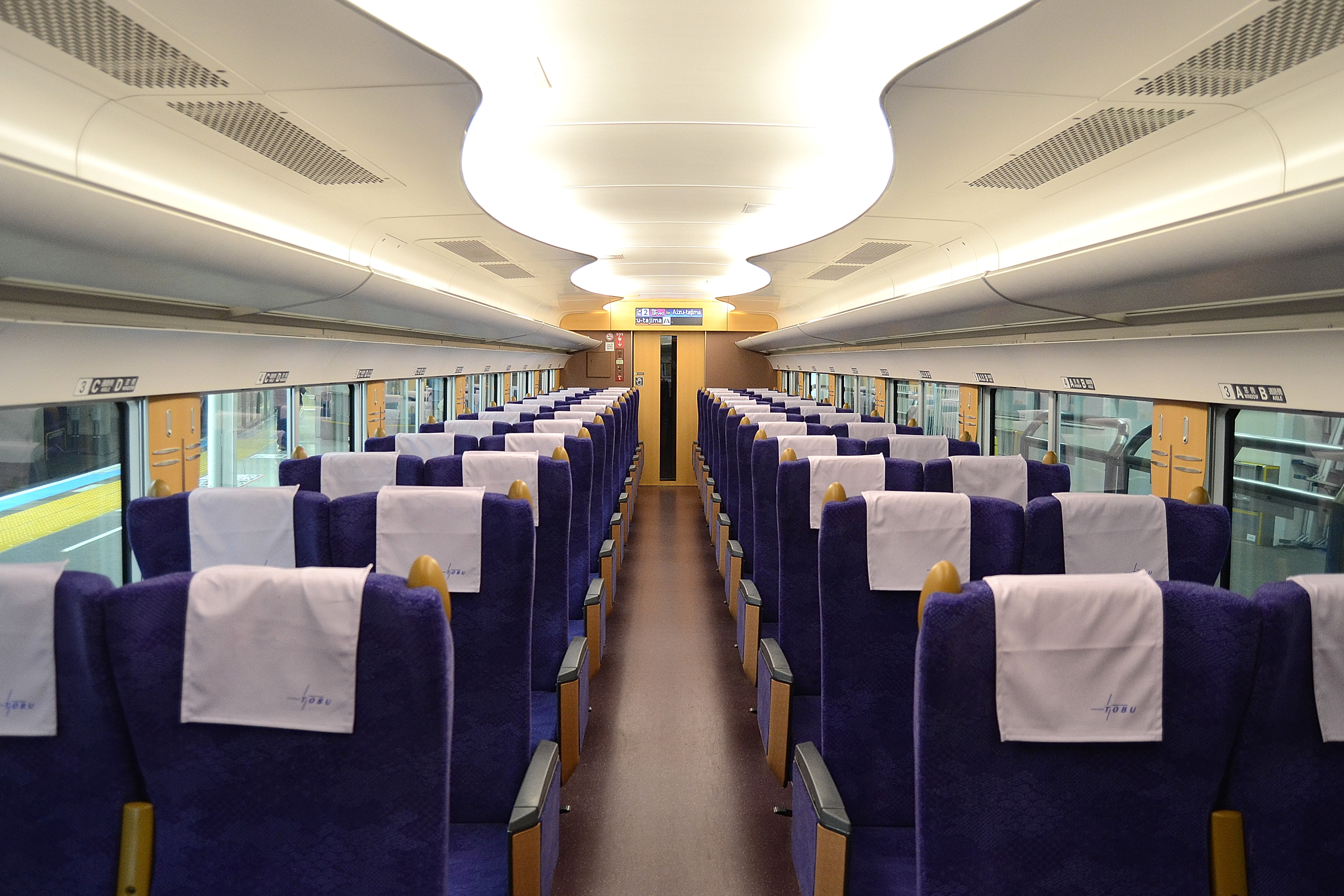
Passenger saloon interior

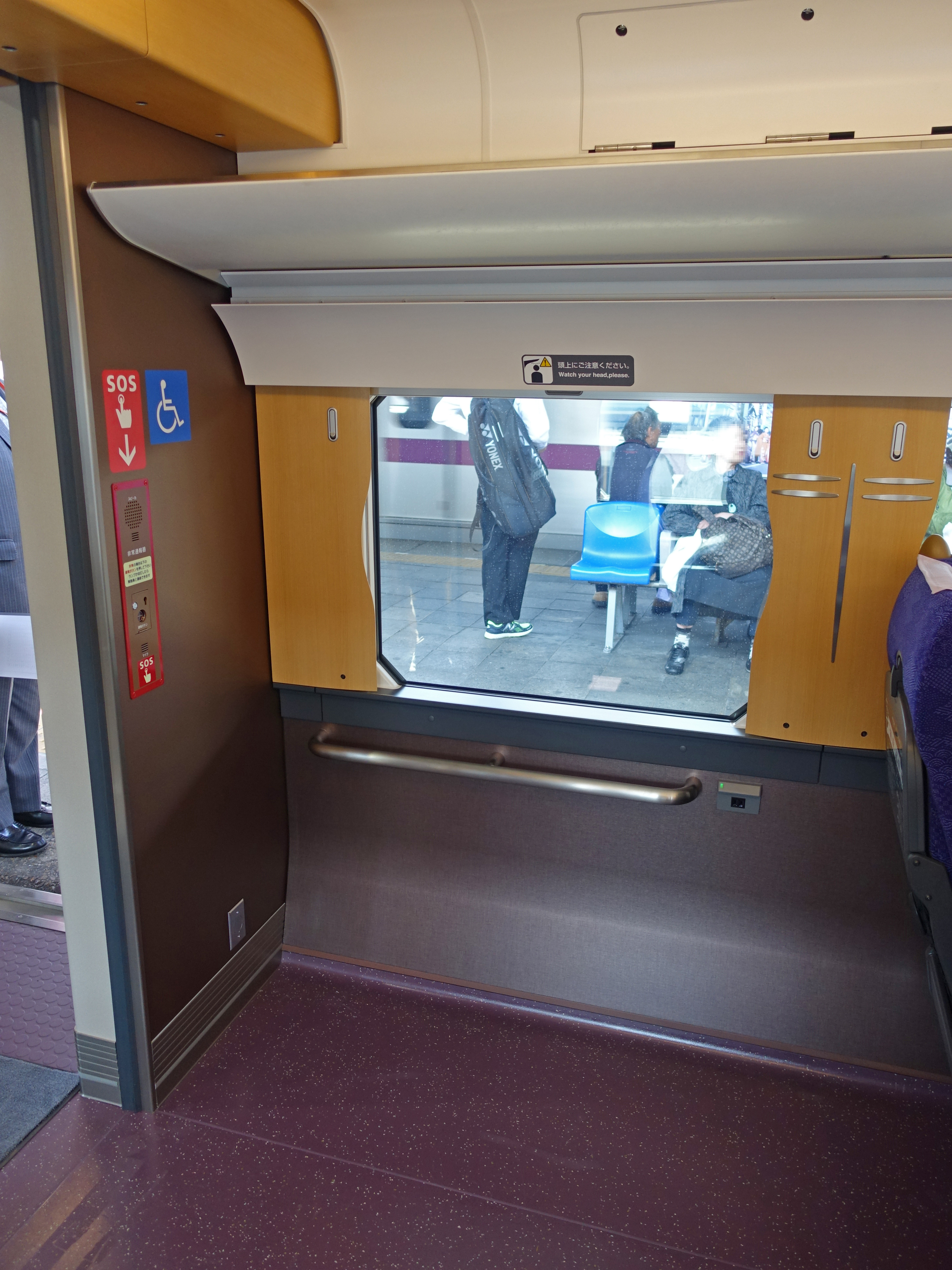
Wheelchair space

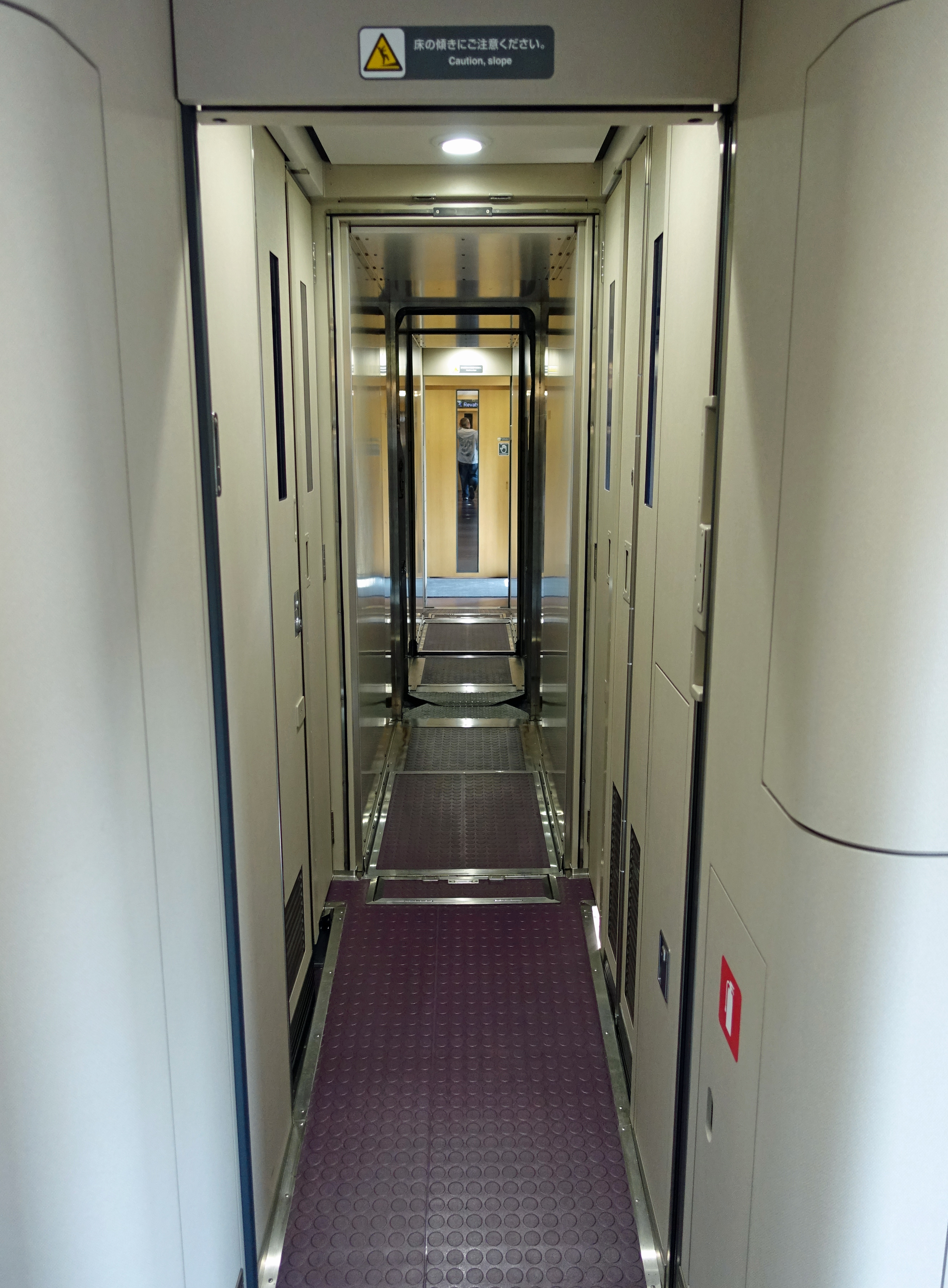
The connecting gangway between units

=== Toilet facilities ===
Each trainset includes a universal access toilet, western-style toilet, and urinal, located in the centre car.

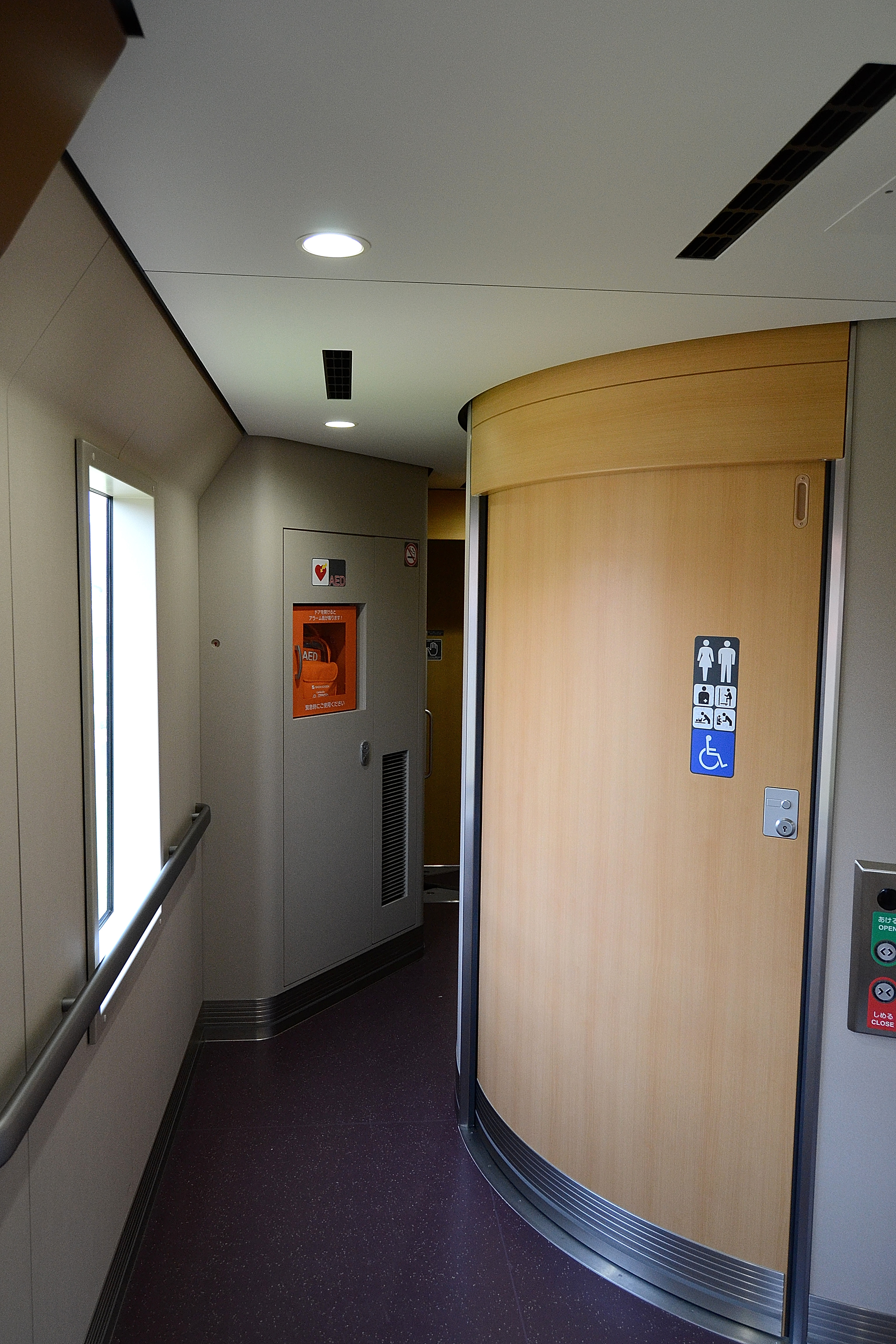
The universal-access toilet

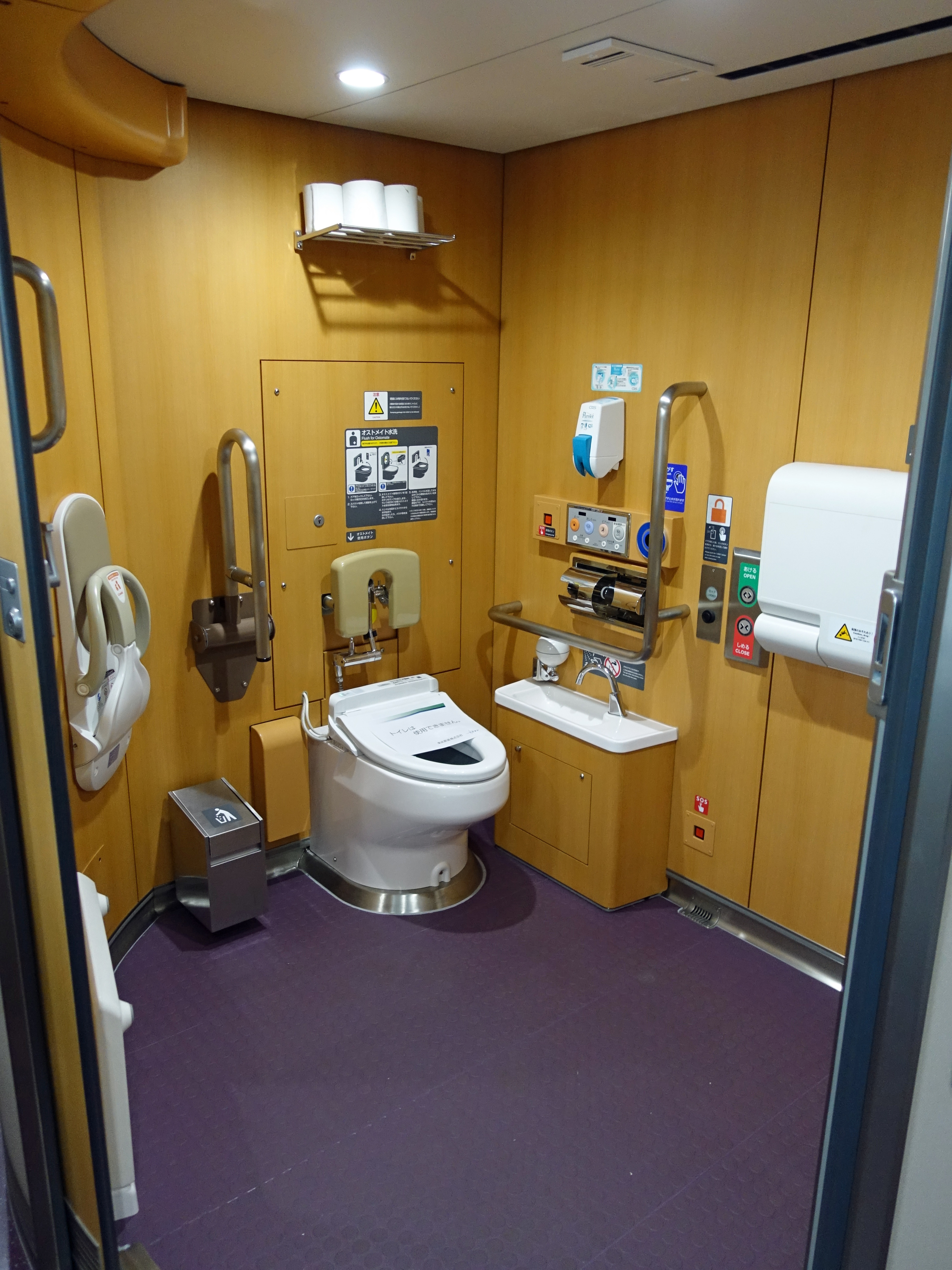
Interior of the universal-access toilet

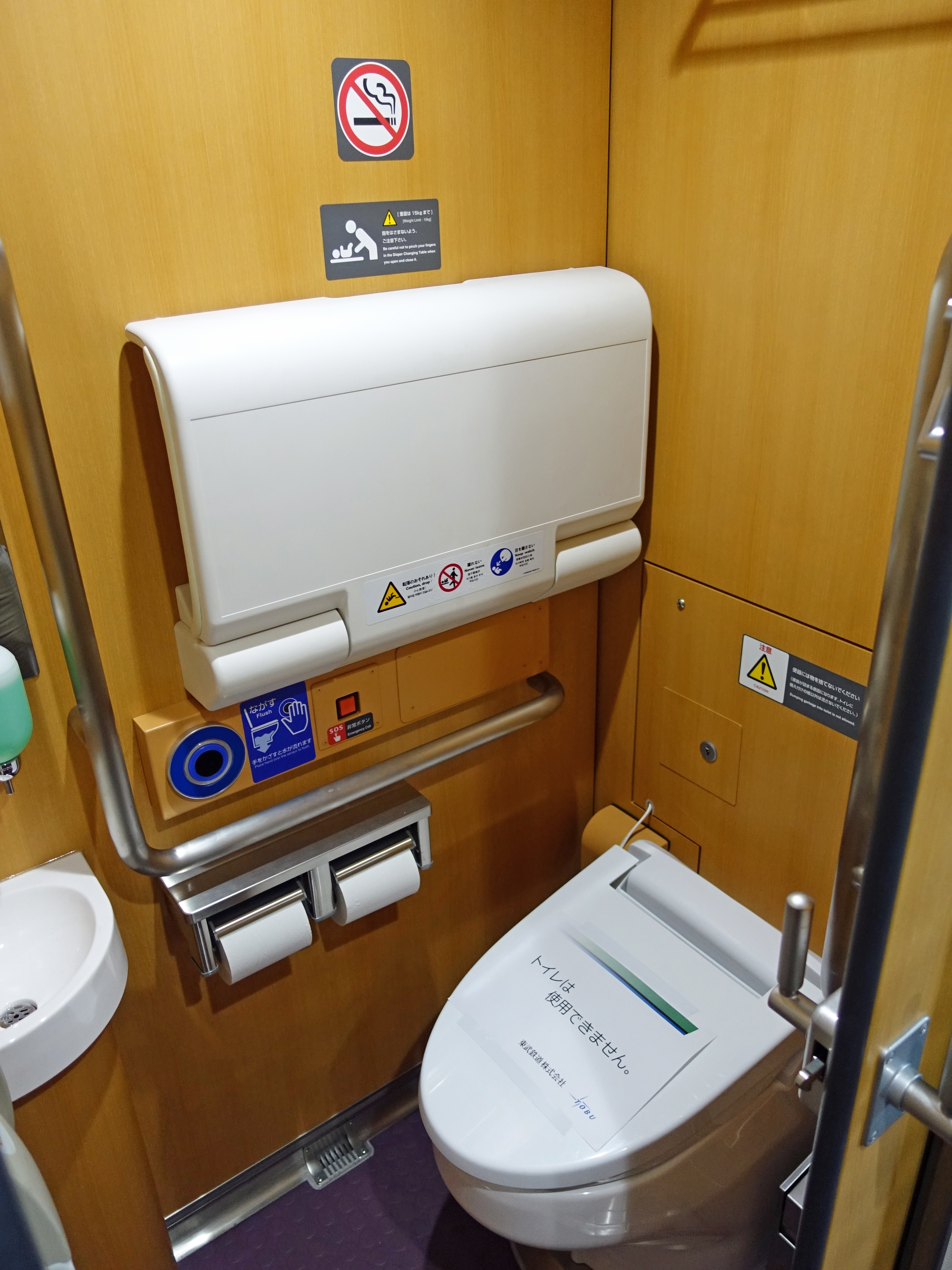
The standard western-style toilet

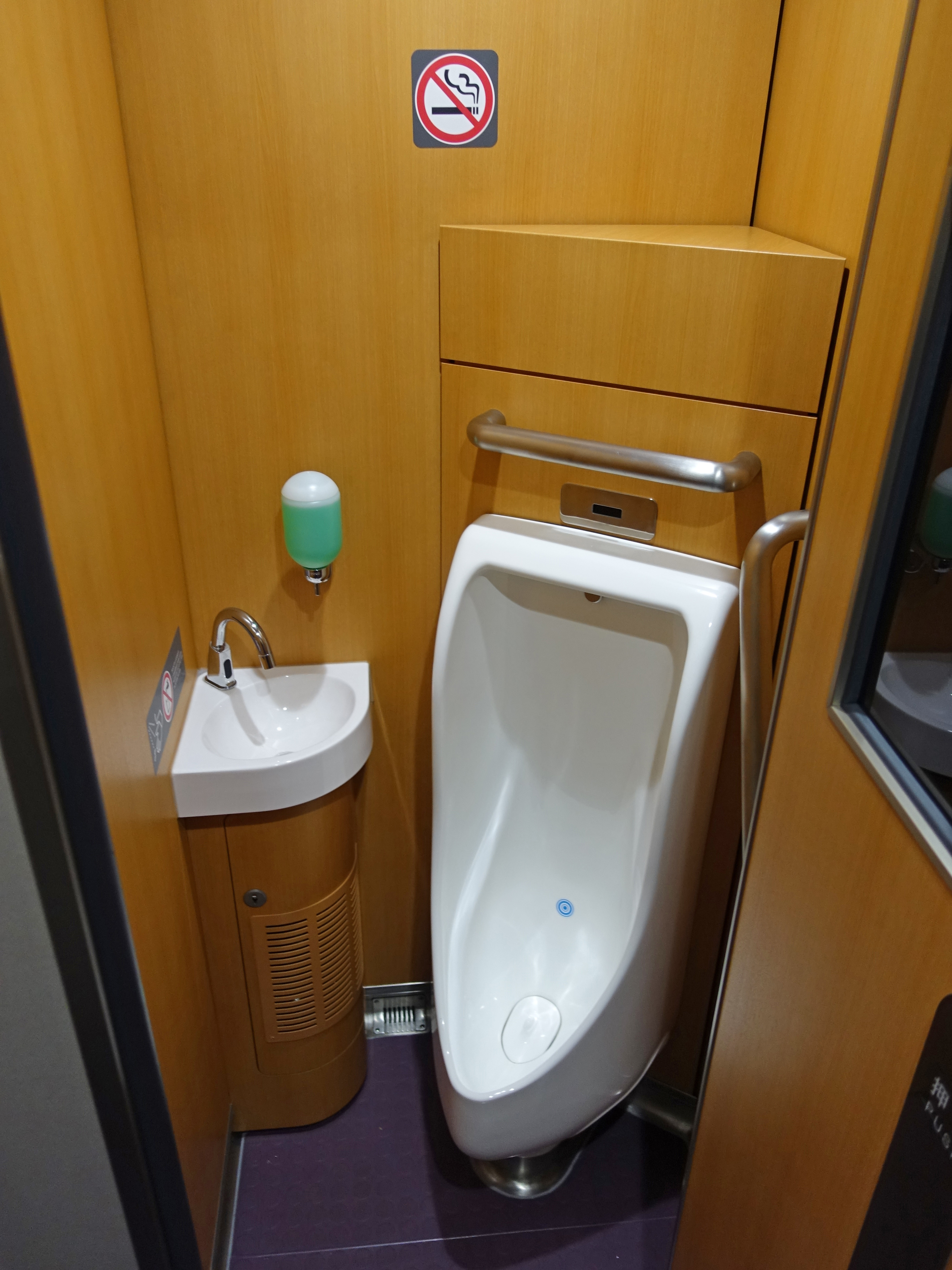
The men's urinal

== History ==
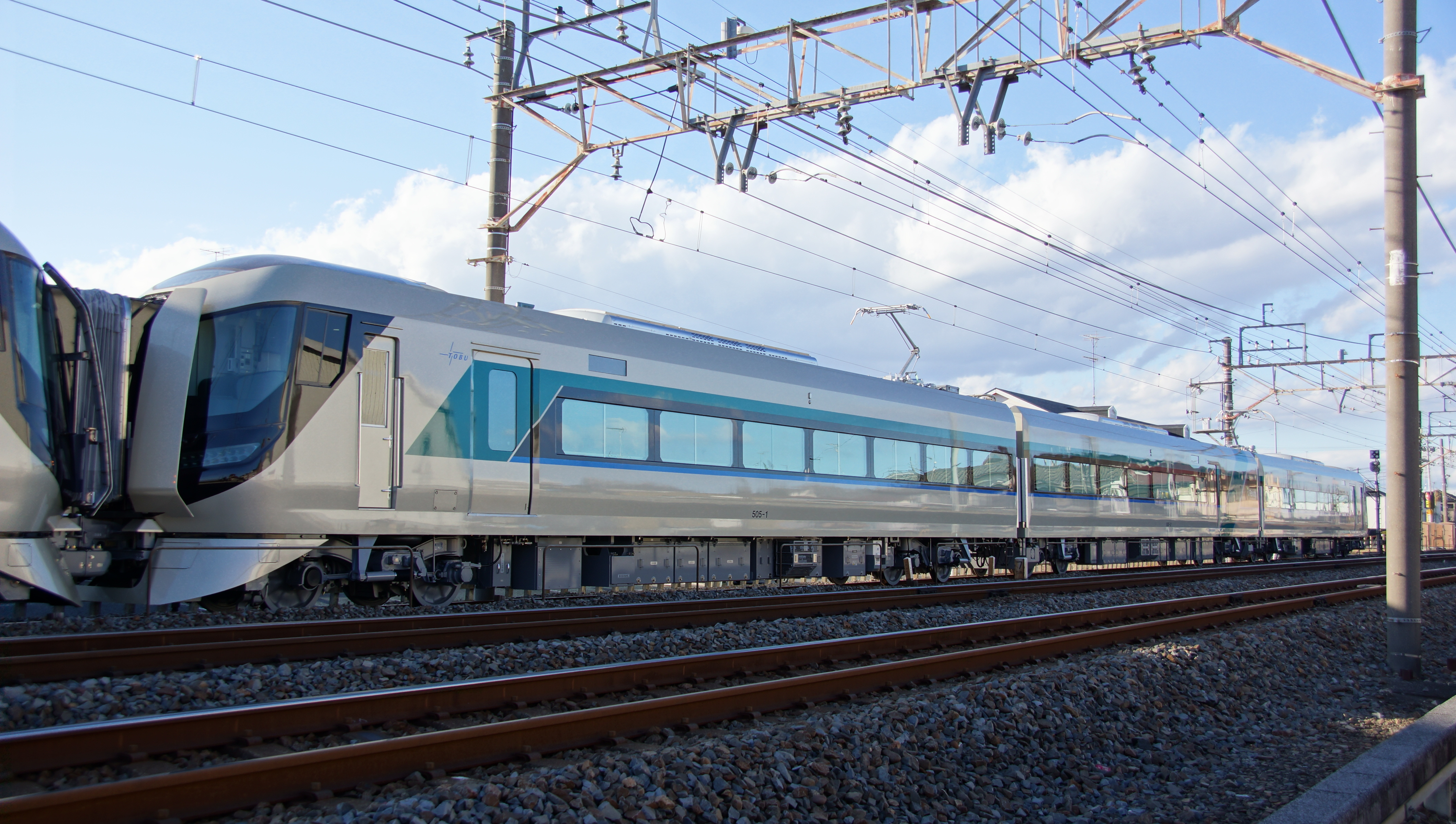
Sets 505 and 504 on delivery in January 2017

Tobu Railway officially announced initial details of the new trains on 22 April 2015. In April 2016, Tobu announced that the trains would be used on through services between Asakusa in Tokyo and Aizu-Tajima in Fukushima Prefecture via the Yagan Railway and Aizu Railway Aizu Line from spring 2017.

The first three sets, 501 to 503, were delivered from the Kawasaki Heavy Industries factory in Kobe in December 2016.

The 500 series "Revaty" trains were a recipient of the 2018 Laurel Prize from the Japan Railfan Club.

Sets 509, 510, and 511 were delivered in September 2020. These sets' delivery was the final working on the Chichibu Railway Mikajiri Line before its closure.
