= Vaxell 60i =

Polish aircraft engine

60i
- Type: Aircraft engine
- National origin: Poland
- Manufacturer: Vaxell

The Vaxell 60i is a Polish aircraft engine, designed and produced by Vaxell of Bydgoszcz for use in ultralight and homebuilt aircraft.

== Design and development ==
The Vaxell 60i engine is a four-cylinder four-stroke, horizontally opposed, 1,600 cc (97.6 cu in) displacement, air-cooled, direct-drive, gasoline engine design. It employs dual electronic ignition, electronic, multipoint fuel injection and produces 60 hp (45 kW) at 3200 rpm.

== Specifications (60i) ==
Data from Tacke

=== General characteristics ===
- Type: Four-cylinder, four-stroke aircraft engine
- Displacement: 1,600 cc (97.6 cu in)
- Length: 670 mm (26.4 in)
- Width: 770 mm (30.3 in)
- Height: 380 mm (15.0 in)
- Dry weight: 73.5 kg (162.0 lb) dry weight

=== Components ===
- Fuel system: electronic, multipoint fuel injection
- Fuel type: gasoline
- Cooling system: air
- Reduction gear: none

=== Performance ===
- Power output: 60 hp (45 kW) at 3200 rpm

== See also ==
Related lists

- List of aircraft engines
