= 180 AM =

No licensed radio stations broadcast on AM frequency 180 kHz any longer. Turkish broadcaster TRT is reported to have used the frequency in the past. In the United States, this frequency falls within the 160-190 kHz LowFER band allowed by Part 15 of the Federal Communications Commission, and hobby stations are permitted to use this frequency.

The audio frequency 180 kHz has been used to track fish.

== Former ==
- Netherlands: Radio Maria on Longwave (Switched off in 2016)
- United States: Hit Nation on Longwave (Switched off on an unknown date)
- Japan: NHK on Longwave (Switched off in 2000s)

== Song ==
"A.M. 180" is the name of a song composed by Jason Lytle and performed by Grandaddy, an American indie rock band from Modesto, California, and subsequently by PUP, a band based in Toronto.
