= 2019 Catalan general strike =

General strike by Catalan separatists on 18 October 2019

Demonstrations

The 2019 Catalan general strike, also known as 18-O, was a general strike held by Catalan separatists on 18 October 2019, on the fifth night of the 2019 protests following the verdict against Catalonia independence leaders for their participation in a referendum on independence two years earlier.

Strikes for political reasons are not allowed by Spanish law. The main labor unions in the country, UGT and CCOO, did not participate.

== See also ==
- Catalan autonomist campaign of 1918-1919
