= List of broadcast video formats =

TV frame rate in use in any given country highly aligns with the utility frequency in use.

This list of broadcast formats is a review of the most popular formats used to broadcast video information over cable television, satellite television, the Internet, and other means. Video broadcasting was popularized by the advent of the television during the middle of the twentieth century.

Recently, Internet streaming has almost surpassed television as the top video broadcast platform.

Below is a list of broadcast video formats.

- 24p is a progressive scan format and is now widely adopted by those planning on transferring a video signal to film. Film and video makers use 24p even if they are not going to transfer their productions to film, simply because of the on-screen "look" of the (low) frame rate, which matches native film. When transferred to NTSC television, the rate is effectively slowed to 23.976 FPS (24×1000÷1001 to be exact), and when transferred to PAL or SECAM it is sped up to 25 FPS. 35 mm movie cameras use a standard exposure rate of 24 FPS, though many cameras offer rates of 23.976 FPS for NTSC television and 25 FPS for PAL/SECAM. The 24 FPS rate became the de facto standard for sound motion pictures in the mid-1920s. Practically all hand-drawn animation is designed to be played at 24 FPS. Actually hand-drawing 24 unique frames per second ("1's") is costly. Even in big budget films, usually hand-drawn animation is done shooting on "2's" (one hand-drawn frame is shown twice, so only 12 unique frames per second) and some animation is even drawn on "4's" (one hand-drawn frame is shown four times, so only six unique frames per second).
- 25p is a progressive format and runs 25 progressive frames per second. This frame rate derives from the PAL television standard of 50i (or 50 interlaced fields per second). Film and television companies use this rate in 50 Hz regions for direct compatibility with television field and frame rates. Conversion for 60 Hz countries is enabled by doing 2:2:3:2:3 pulldown. This is similar to 2:3 pulldown, and the result looks identical to a typical film transfer. While 25p captures half the temporal resolution or motion that normal 50i PAL registers, it yields a higher vertical spatial resolution per frame. Like 24p, 25p is often used to achieve "cine"-look, albeit with virtually the same motion artifacts. It is also better suited to progressive-scan output (e.g., on LCD displays, computer monitors and projectors) because the interlacing is absent.
- 25i, also known as 50i, is an interlaced format showing 25 interlaced frames per second, or 50 fields per second, and is the standard broadcast framerate for countries with a PAL and SECAM television history (most of the world). The interlaced format sacrifices some detail in vertical resolution in favor of a higher apparent framerate, and can be thought to be 50 individual sub-sampled frames per second. The European Broadcasting Union and broadcast manufacturers like VizRT refer to modern HD broadcasts of 1080-line pictures as 1080i25, but the term 1080i50 is also used in the industry by companies such as Blackmagic and Grass Valley
- 29.97i, also commonly referred to as 30i, 59.94i, 60i, provides 30000/1001 interlaced frames per second, or 60000/1001 fields per second. This is the standard broadcast frame rate for countries with an NTSC history—mainly the US, Canada, Japan and South Korea. This was the standard format of American TVs due to the displaying of CRT screens which were common place before the wide spread use of digital monitors. Alternating currents are used to time each scan, by which two scans are performed per frame due to interlacing of the display. The NTSC method implemented in the display of televisions bandwidth of the frequency requires an odd integer multiple of the horizontal frequency divided into two separate interlacing parallel line patterns. The Horizontal frequency was 15,750. This format was the solution caused by the problem of 30 Frames per second is not able to output to the even integer by the odd integer multiple. Each conducted scan equals 262.5 rows on the television set with interlacing totaling 525 rows. Before 1953 the entire frequency band of the TV was divided between black and white image and sound, but after the introduction of color broadcasting to widespread commercial use, more information was needed to provide for the color. The space between each frequency on the band was dedicated as to not cause electromagnetic interference between the picture and the sound. 6 MHz is dedicated to each analog broadcasting station. 1.5 MHz of which is unusable due to the electromagnetic interference gap between frequencies. This format fell out of use because of the introduction of digital broadcasting and online streaming.
- 30p is a progressive format and produces video at 30 frames per second. Progressive (noninterlaced) scanning mimics a film camera's frame-by-frame image capture. The effects of inter-frame judder are less noticeable than 24p yet retains a cinematic-like appearance. Shooting video in 30p mode gives no interlace artifacts but can introduce judder on image movement and on some camera pans. The widescreen film process Todd-AO used this frame rate in 1954–1956.
- 48p is a progressive format and that is being trialled in the film industry. At twice the traditional rate of 24p, this frame rate attempts to reduce motion blur and flicker found in films. Director James Cameron stated his intention to film the two sequels to his film Avatar higher than 24 frames per second to add a heightened sense of reality. The first film to be filmed at 48 FPS was The Hobbit: An Unexpected Journey, a decision made by its director Peter Jackson. At a preview screening at CinemaCon, the audience's reaction was mixed after being shown some of the film's footage at 48p, with some arguing that the feel of the footage was too lifelike (thus breaking the suspension of disbelief).
- 50p is the frame rate used for 720p broadcast HDTV in countries with a PAL or SECAM broadcasting history, as specified in SMPTE 296M. In Europe, the EBU considers 1080p50 the next step future proof system for TV broadcasts and is encouraging broadcasters to upgrade their equipment for the future. Many modern cameras can shoot video at 50p and 60p in various resolutions. YouTube allowed users to upload videos at 50 FPS and 60 FPS in June 2014. YouTube also allowed full HFR videos previously uploaded before 2014. Douglas Trumbull, who undertook experiments with different frame rates that led to the Showscan film format, found that emotional impact peaked at 60 FPS for viewers.
- 59.94p is the frame rate used for 720p broadcast HDTV in the USA and other countries with an NTSC broadcasting history, as specified in SMPTE 296M. The exact rate is 60000/1001, which works out to be slightly over 59.94 frames per second.
- 60p is a progressive format that is very close to the 60000/1001 broadcast system used in some countries. In the Broadcast industry it is sometimes but not always used as shorthand for 60000/1001 frames per second. Outside of broadcast, material is often filmed, edited, and displayed at 60 frames per second for delivery via streaming services.
- 72p is a progressive format and is currently in experimental stages. Major institutions such as Snell have demonstrated 720p72 pictures as a result of earlier analogue experiments, where 768 line television at 75 FPS looked subjectively better than 1150 line 50 FPS progressive pictures with higher shutter speeds available (and a corresponding lower data rate). Modern cameras such as the Red One can use this frame rate to produce slow motion replays at 24 FPS.
- 100p / 119.88p / 120p are progressive-scan formats standardized for UHDTV by the ITU-R BT.2020 recommendation.

== See also ==
- Digital television
- Cable television
- Broadcast engineering
- Glossary of broadcasting terms
- Pan-American television frequencies
- Broadcast television systems
