= Tobu 200 series =

Electric multiple unit train type operated by Tobu Railway in Japan

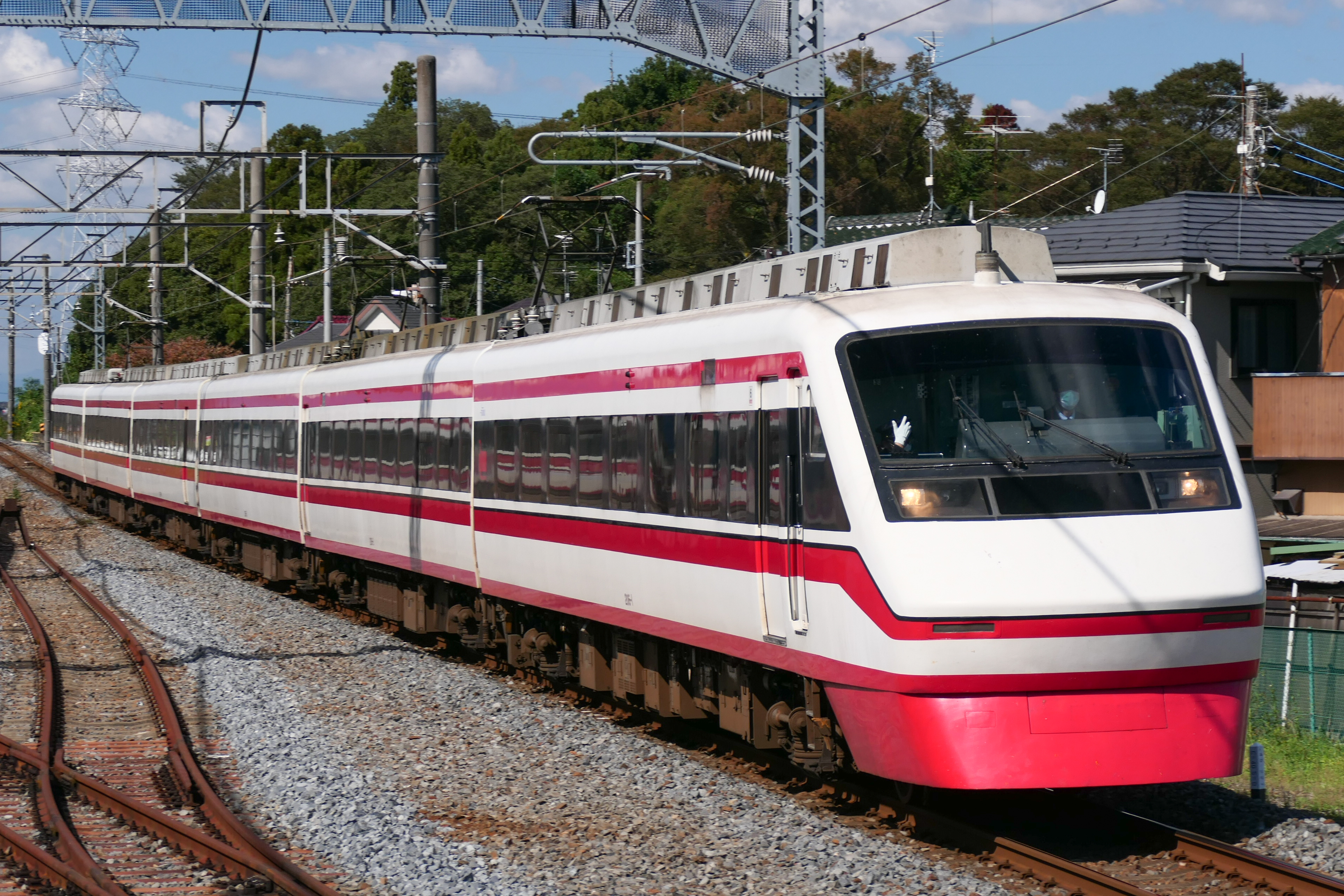
- A 200 series in October 2021
- In service: 1991–present
- Manufacturer: Alna Kōki, Tokyu Car Corporation
- Replaced: 1800 series
- Constructed: 1990–1998
- Number built: 60 vehicles (10 sets)
- Number in service: 60 vehicles (10 sets)
- Formation: 6 cars per trainset
- Operators: Tobu Railway
- Depots: Tatebayashi
- Lines served: Tobu Skytree Line, Tobu Isesaki Line, Tobu Kiryu Line

Specifications
- Car body construction: Steel
- Car length: 20 m (65 ft 7 3/8 in)
- Doors: One per side
- Maximum speed: 110 km/h (68 mph)
- Traction system: 200 series: Resistor control + field system superimposed field excitation control 250 series: Variable frequency (IGBT, PMSM)
- Electric system(s): 1,500 V DC
- Current collector(s): Overhead line
- Track gauge: 1,067 mm (3 ft 6 in)

The Tobu 200 series and 250 series (東武200系・250系, Tōbu 200/250-kei) are electric multiple unit (EMU) train types operated in Japan on limited express services by the private railway operator Tobu Railway since 1991. The trains are used on Ryōmō services from Asakusa in Tokyo to Akagi and Kuzū.

== Formations ==
As of 1 April 2012, the fleet consists of nine 6-car 200 series sets and one 6-car 250 series set.

=== 200 series sets 201 to 209 ===
Car No.	1	2	3	4	5	6
Designation	Mc2	M4	M3	M2	M1	Mc1
Numbering	200-6	200-5	200-4	200-3	200-2	200-1

Cars 2, 4, and 5 are each fitted with a pantograph (scissors type on sets 201 to 206, and single-arm type on sets 207 to 209.

=== 250 series set 251 ===
Car No.	1	2	3	4	5	6
Designation	Tc2	M3	T	M2	M1	Tc1
Numbering	251-6	251-5	251-4	251-3	251-2	251-1

Car 2 is fitted with one single-arm pantograph, and car 4 is fitted with two single-arm pantographs.

== Interior ==
Passenger accommodation is monoclass with unidirectional reclining seats arranged with a seat pitch of 985 mm (38.8 in). Seats in the 200 series sets were reused from former 1700 and 1720 series trainsets, with new seat cover moquette. Vending machines selling drinks are provided onboard.

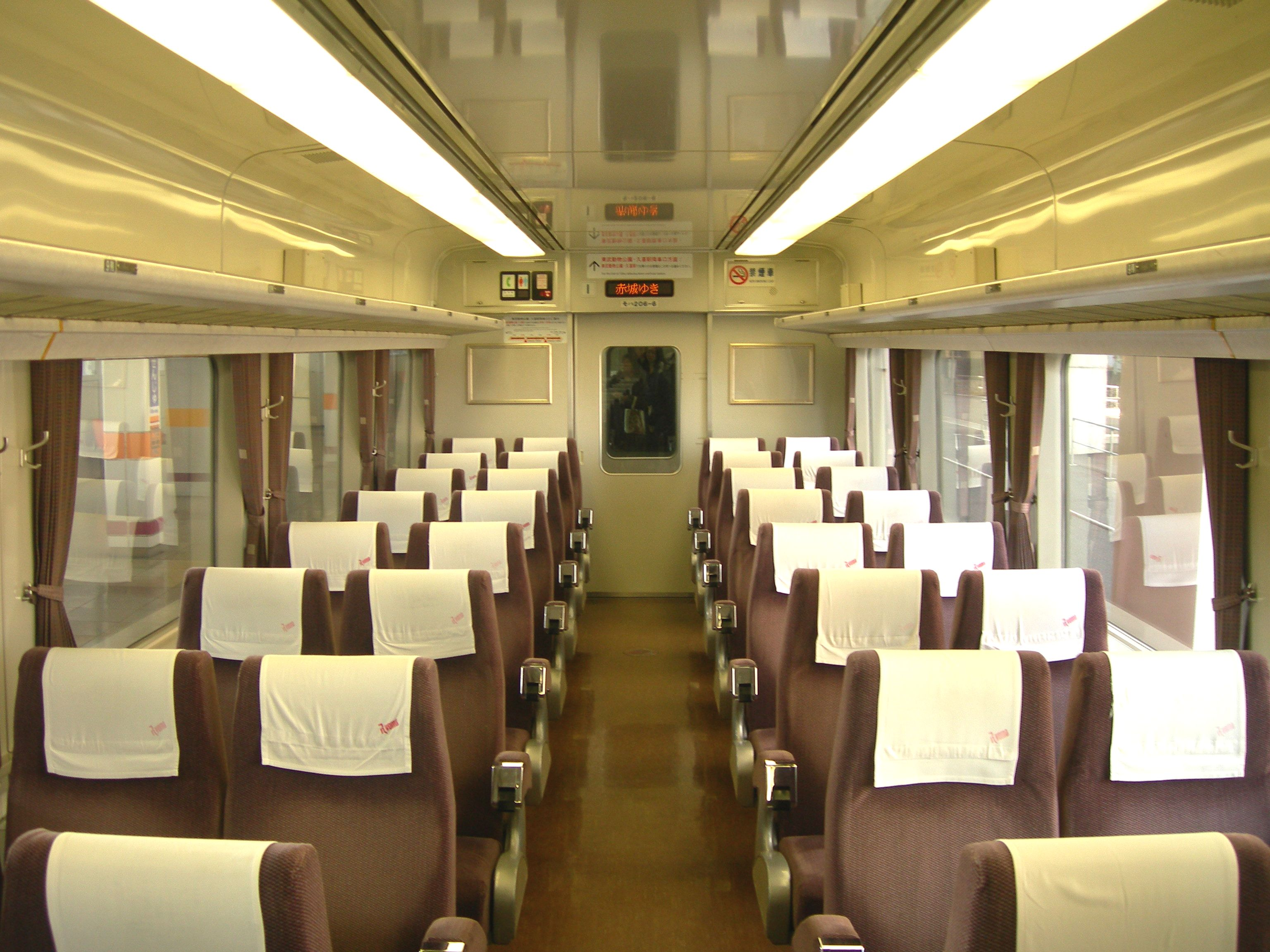
Interior view

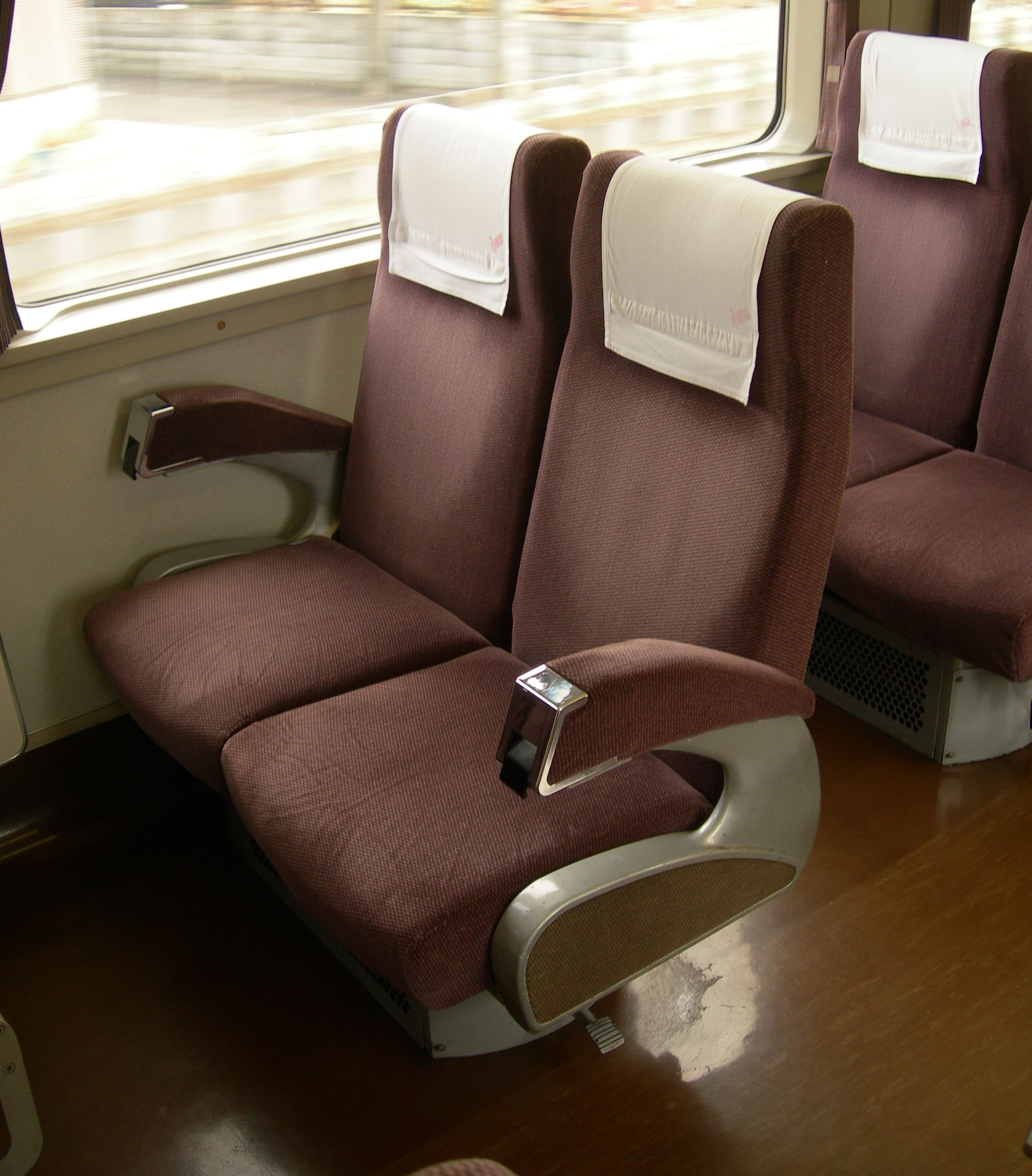
Reclining seats

== History ==
The first seven 200 series sets were built between 1991 and 1996 utilizing the bogies and traction motors from former 1700/1720 series "DRC" EMUs displaced by the arrival of new Spacia 100 series EMUs. The trains entered service from 1 February 1991. Sets 208 and 209 built in fiscal 1997 featured HID headlights, LED destination indicators, and single-arm pantographs. 250 series set 251, was an entirely new build, delivered in March 1998. This featured the same 190 kW traction motors and bogies as the 30000 series, with VVVF control. Only three of the six cars in this set are motored.

In December 2014, set 206 was overhauled and returned to traffic with new seats, replacing the original 1700/1720 series seating.

== Livery variations ==
=== Puyuma Express ===
In June 2016, 200 series set 208 was repainted in a special livery based on that of the Puyuma Express trains operated in Taiwan by the Taiwan Railways Administration (TRA). This follows the signing of a friendship agreement between Tobu and TRA in December 2015.

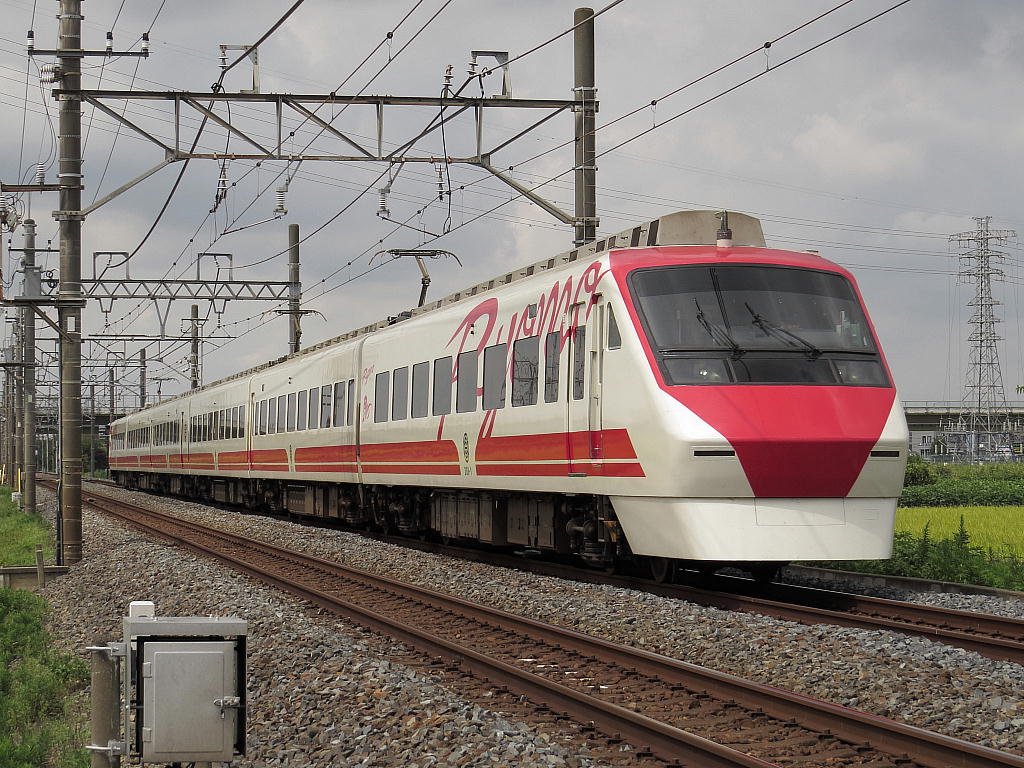
Set 208 in Puyuma Express livery in September 2016

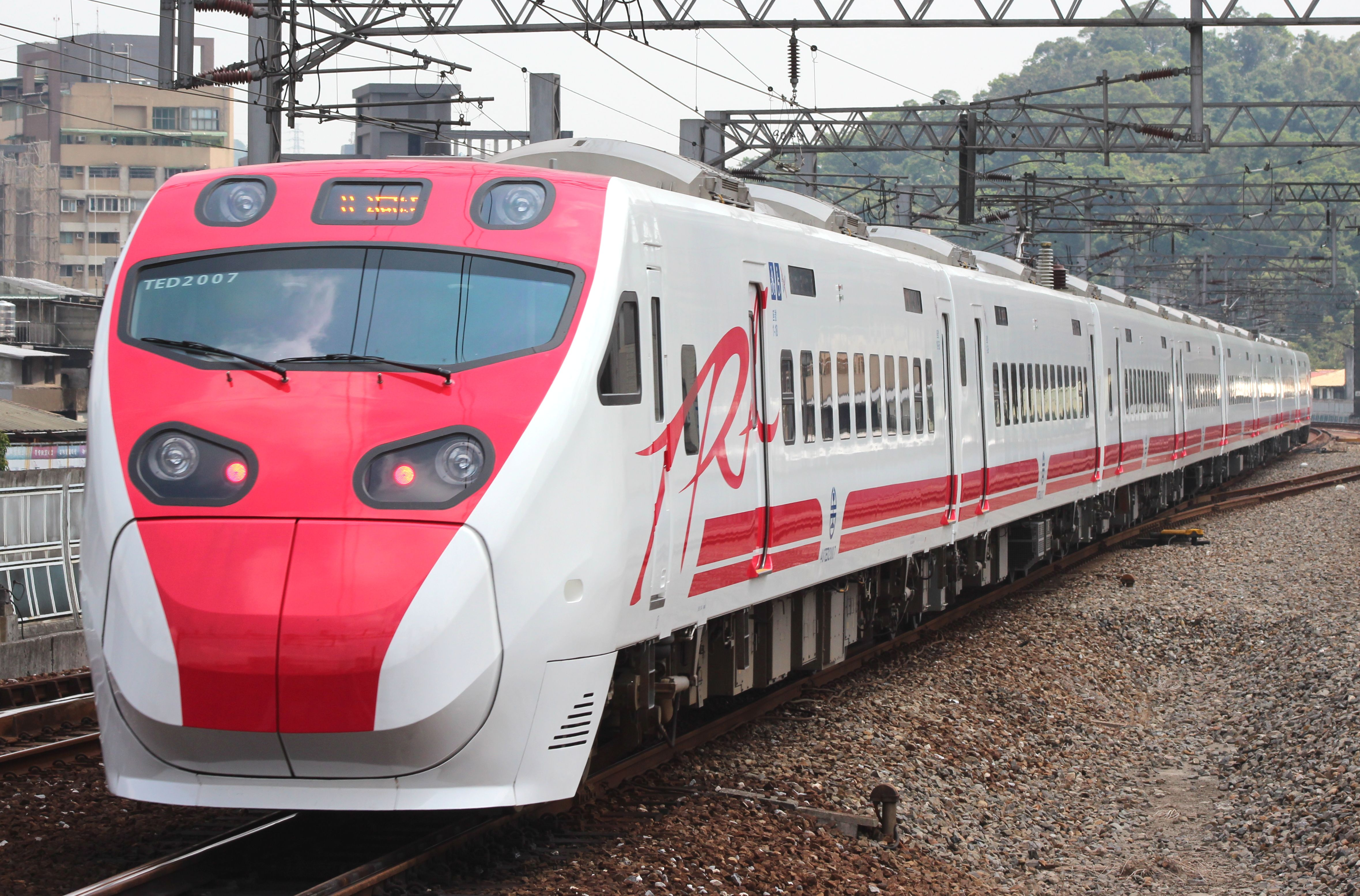
A TRA TEM2000 series Puyuma Express EMU in August 2013

=== 1800 series livery ===
On 5 August 2021, 200 series set 205 was repainted in a livery based on that of the 1800 series trainsets. In addition, its seat covers were changed to resemble those of the 1800 series. Set 209 returned to service in the same livery on 8 February 2022.

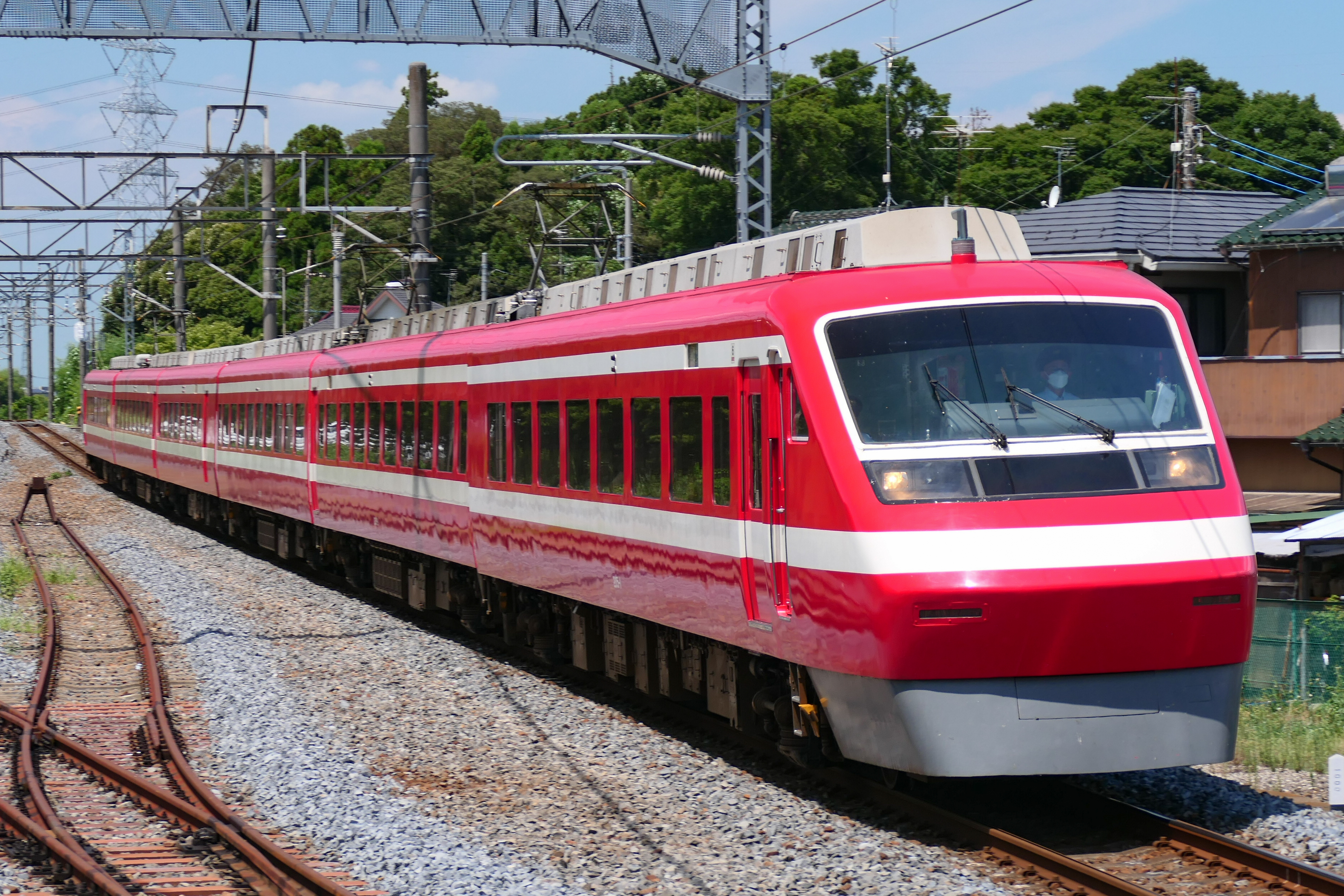
Set 205 in August 2022
