= I80 =

I80 or variation, may refer to:

- Interstate 80 (I-80), a U.S. highway
- Aérotrain I80, a hovertrain
- Cascade Kasperwing I-80, an ultralight motorglider
- HMS Sherwood (I80), a WWII British Royal Navy Clemson-class destroyer

== See also ==
- Watt/I-80 station, Sacramento, California
- 80i
