= 18 =

Eighteen or 18 may refer to:

- 18 (number)
- One of the years 18 BC, AD 18, 1918, 2018

== Film, television and entertainment ==
- 18 (film), a 1993 Taiwanese experimental film based on the short story God's Dice
- Eighteen (film), a 2005 Canadian dramatic feature film
- 18 (British Board of Film Classification), a film rating in the United Kingdom, also used in Ireland by the Irish Film Classification Office
- 18 (Dragon Ball), a character in the Dragon Ball franchise
- "Eighteen", a 2006 episode of the animated television series 12 oz. Mouse

== Science ==
- Argon, a noble gas in the periodic table
- 18 Melpomene, an asteroid in the asteroid belt

== Music ==
=== Albums ===
- 18 (Moby album), 2002
- 18 (Nana Kitade album), 2005
- 18..., 2009 debut album by G.E.M.
- 18 (Jeff Beck and Johnny Depp album), 2022

=== Songs ===
- "18" (5 Seconds of Summer song), from their 2014 eponymous debut album
- "18" (One Direction song), from their 2014 studio album Four
- "18", by Anarbor from their 2013 studio album Burnout
- "I'm Eighteen", by Alice Cooper commonly referred to as simply "Eighteen", 1970
- "Eighteen" (CLC song), 2015
- "Eighteen" (Pale Waves song), 2018
- "Eighteen", by Connie Francis, 1957
- "Eighteen", by ¡Forward, Russia!, 2006
- "Eighteen", by Patricia Cahill, B-side to "Colm Bán", 1971

== See also ==
- 18 rating (disambiguation)
- 018 (disambiguation) (zero-one-eight)
- o18 (disambiguation) (o-one-eight)
- One8, a lifestyle brand by Indian cricketer Virat Kohli
