= Tobu 1800 series =

Electric multiple unit train type operated by Tobu Railway in Japan

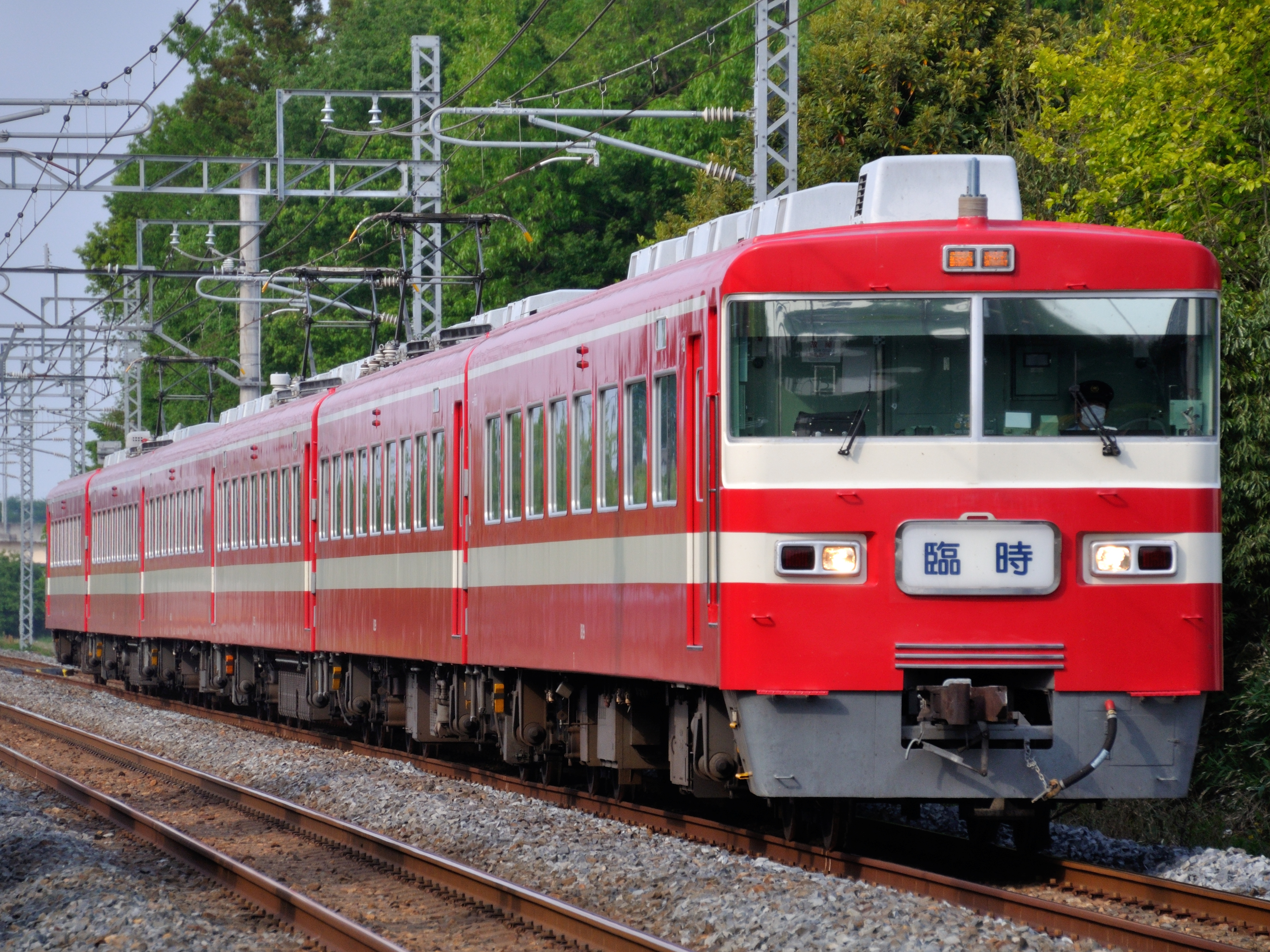
- Set 1819 on a seasonal Rapid service in May 2013
- In service: September 1969 – May 2018
- Manufacturer: Alna Koki, Nippon Sharyo
- Constructed: 1969–1987
- Scrapped: May 2018
- Number in service: None
- Formation: 6/8 cars per trainset
- Operators: Tobu Railway
- Depots: Minami-Kurihashi
- Lines served: Tobu Skytree Line, Tobu Isesaki Line, Tobu Nikko Line

Specifications
- Car body construction: 20 m (65 ft 7 in)
- Doors: One per side
- Maximum speed: 110 km/h (68 mph)
- Traction system: Resistor control
- Acceleration: 2.2 km/(h⋅s) (1.4 mph/s)
- Deceleration: 3.7 km/(h⋅s) (2.3 mph/s) (service); 4.5 km/(h⋅s) (2.8 mph/s) (emergency)
- Electric system(s): 1,500 V DC
- Current collection: Overhead wire
- Track gauge: 1,067 mm (3 ft 6 in)

The Tobu 1800 series (東武1800系, Tōbu 1800-kei) was an express electric multiple unit (EMU) train type operated by the private railway operator Tobu Railway in Japan from 1969 to 2018.

== Formation ==
One six-car set remained in operation until May 2018, which was based at Minami-Kurihashi Depot, and formed as follows.

Car No.	1	2	3	4	5	6
Designation	Tc2	M3	T1	M1	M2	Tc1
Numbering	1860	1850	1840	1830	1820	1810

Car 4 was fitted with two scissors-type pantographs, and car 2 was fitted with one.

== Interior ==
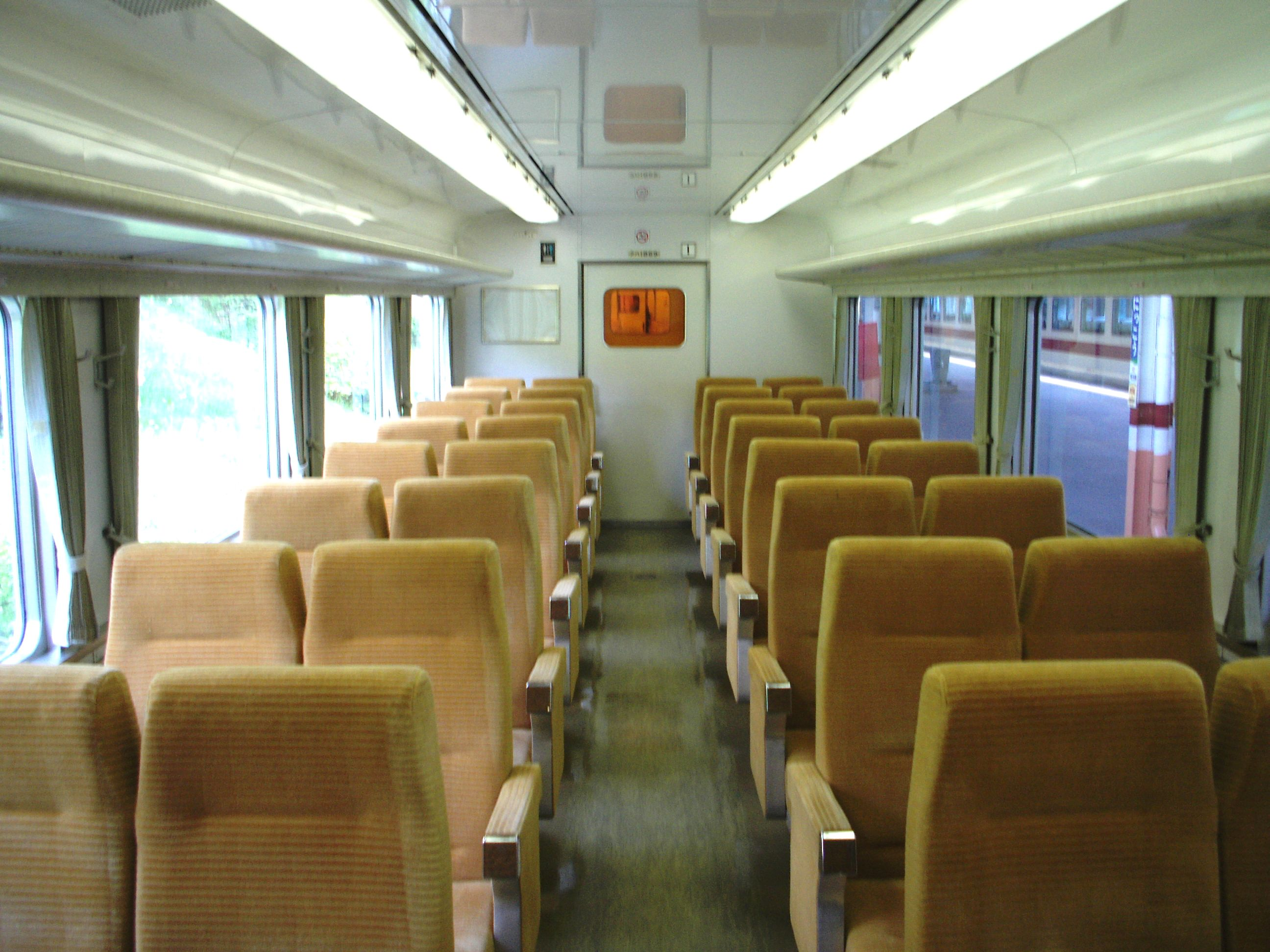
Interior view of set 1819 in May 2007

== History ==
The first 1800 series trains entered service on 20 September 1969 on new Ryōmō express services from Asakusa in Tokyo to Akagi in Gunma Prefecture. 18 8-car sets were built between 1969 and 1973. An additional set, 1819, was built in 1987 as a 6-car set to provide increased capacity.

All cars were made no-smoking from 18 March 2007.

With the appearance of the new 250 series EMU, the 1800 series sets were removed from regular Ryōmō services from 1 April 1998. The remaining set, 1819, was subsequently used for charter trains and seasonal extra services.

The last set was retired on 21 May 2018.

== Conversions ==
=== 300/350 series ===
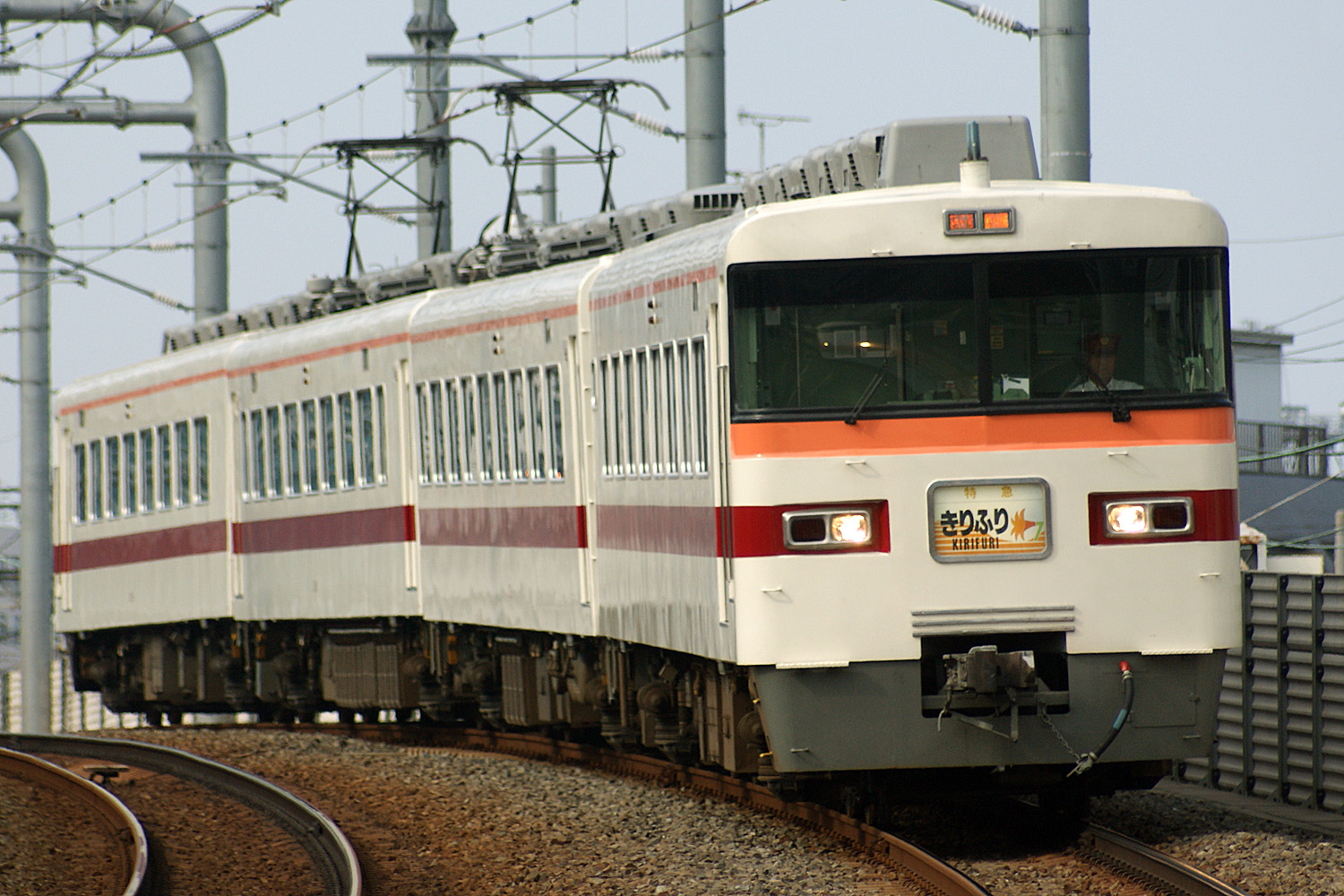
A 350 series set on a Kirifuri service in July 2008

From 1990, two 1800 series sets were modified to become 6-car 300 series sets, and from 1991, three more sets were modified to become 4-car 350 series sets. These entered service from 21 July 1991, replacing 6050 series on express services on the Nikko Line.

=== Commuter version ===
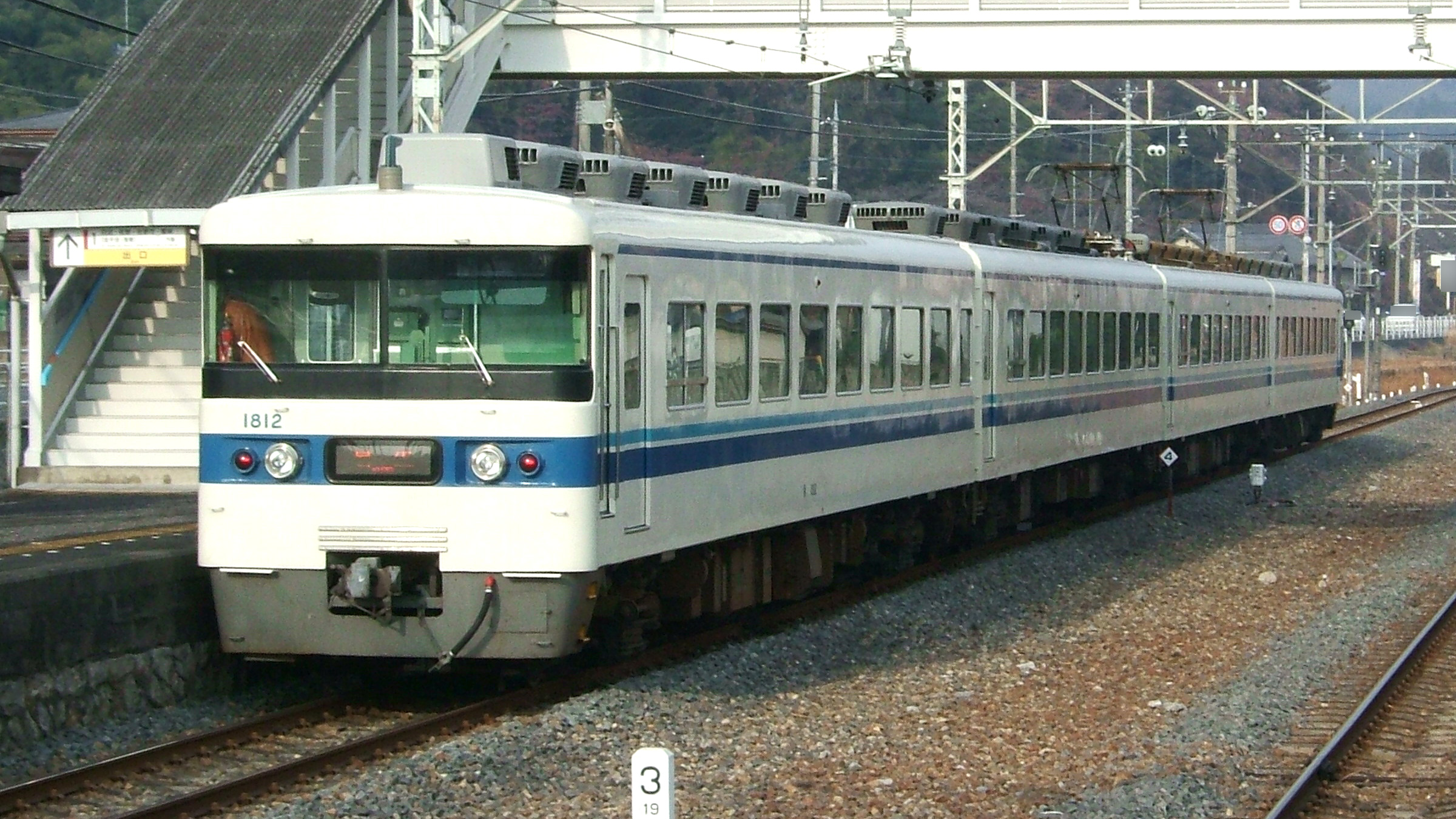
1800 series 4-car commuter version

Three sets (1811–1813) were kept in storage next to Tatebayashi Station from April 1998 following their withdrawal from Ryomo services. These were subsequently shortened to 4-car sets and modified for use on commuter services on the Sano Line and Koizumi Line from 23 April 2001, allowing ageing 5000 series EMUs to be withdrawn. Conversion involved arranging the seats in fixed 4-seat facing bays, removal of the vestibule partitions, and repainting in the Tobu commuter stock colour scheme of white with blue bodyline stripes. These sets were finally withdrawn in early 2007.
