= Kishū Tōshō-gū =

Shinto shrine in Wakayama Wakayama Prefecture, Japan

- 紀州東照宮
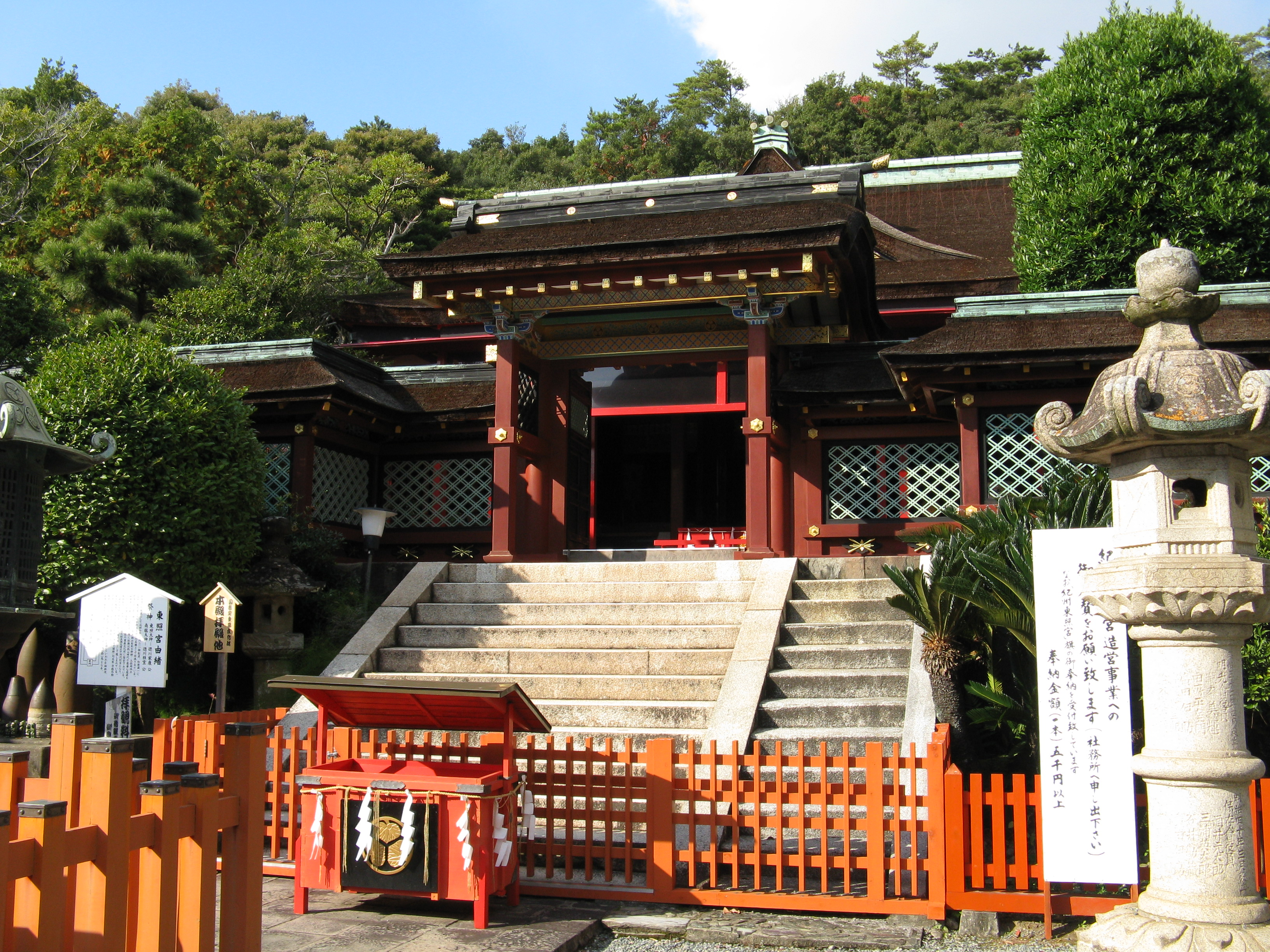
- Kishū Tōshō-gū Karamon

- Kishū Tōshō-gū Kishū Tōshō-gū (Japan)

Religion
- Affiliation: Shinto
- Deity: Tokugawa Ieyasu
- Festival: Second Sunday in May
- Type: Tōshō-gū

Location
- Location: Wakayama, Wakayama Prefecture, Japan
- Interactive map of Kishū Tōshō-gū
- Coordinates: 34.1926°N 135.1657°E

Architecture
- Style: Ishi-no-ma-zukuri
- Founder: Tokugawa Yorinobu
- Established: 1621

Website
- Official website

Kishū Tōshō-gū (紀州東照宮) is a Shinto shrine located in the city of Wakayama Wakayama Prefecture, Japan. It enshrines the deified first Shōgun of the Tokugawa shogunate, Tokugawa Ieyasu. It is also known as the Wakayama Tōshō-gū (和歌山東照宮)

== History ==
The Kishū Tōshō-gū was established by Tokugawa Yorinobu, the tenth son of Tokugawa Ieyasu, in 1621 as the general guardian of the Nankaidō region. It was modeled in the Azuchi–Momoyama style as the Nikkō Tōshō-gū, and had sculptures by Hidari Jingorō and fusuma paintings by Kanō Tan'yū. Black lacquer and red lacquer were applied both inside and outside, and the structures and sculptures were brilliantly colored and plated with metal fittings. The shrine is situated on Mount Saiga, which is located on a cove of Wakaura Bay, with a sand spit resembling the Ama-no-hashidate on the right. Construction on the shrine was begun in 1619, in preparation for Tokugawa Yorinobu officially entering Kii Province and becoming daimyō of Kishū Domain. After his death, his spirit was worshipped as the kami Nanryū-Ōkami (南龍大神) alongside that of Tōshō-Daigongen (東照大権現), or the deified Tokugawa Ieyasu. Prior to the Meiji restoration, the shrine also had a Three-story pagoda and a Yakushi-do chapel, but these were removed per he Shinbutsu bunri decrees of the new Meiji government. The shrine was designated as a prefectural shrine under State Shinto's Modern system of ranked Shinto shrines.

== Cultural Properties ==
Several structures in the Kishū Tōshō-gū are National Important Cultural Properties. These include the two-story Rōmon gate, the main shrine complex containing the Honden and Haiden, East Corridor, West Corridor, Karamon Gate, East Wall and West Wall

== Gallery ==
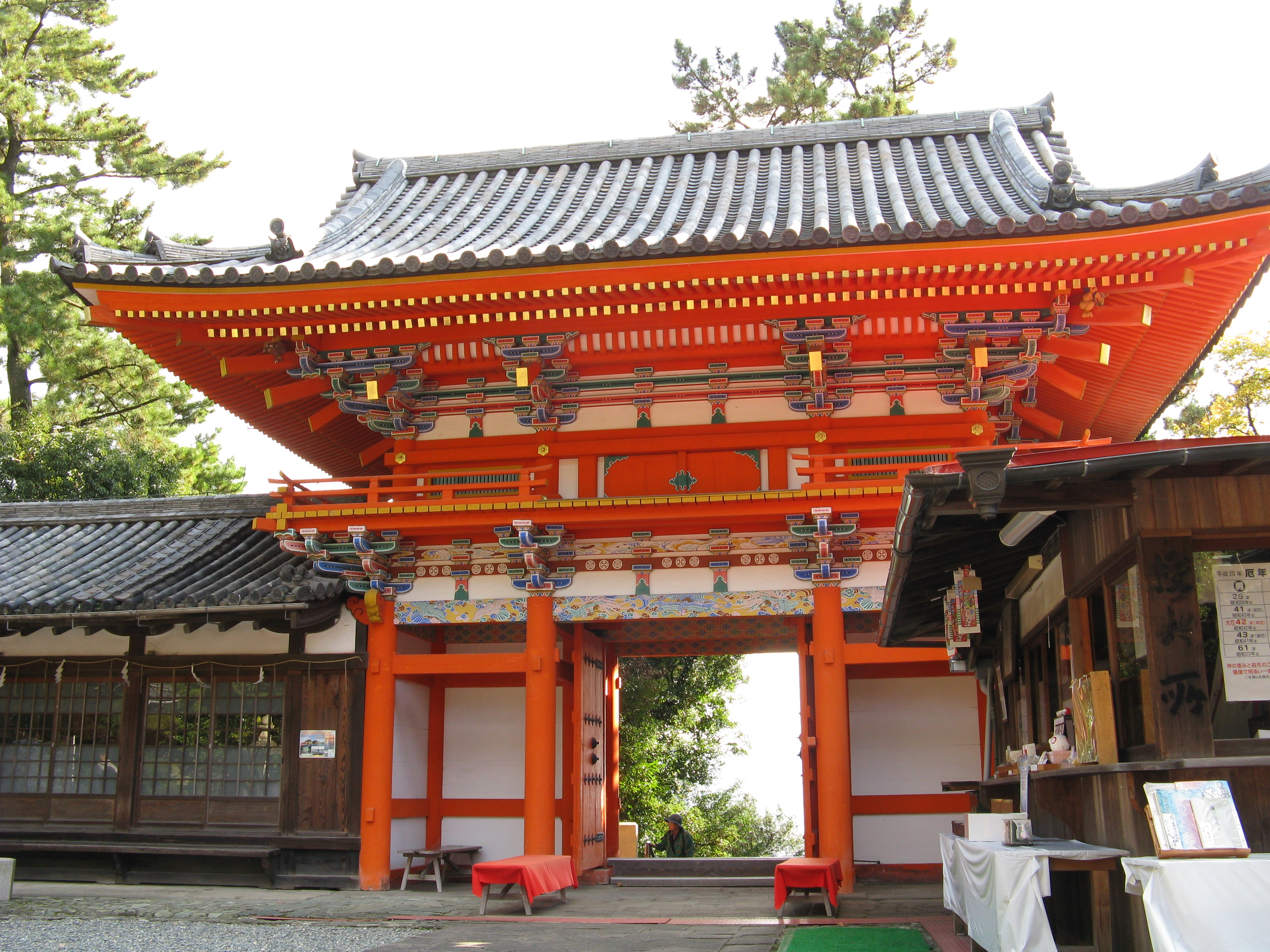
Rōmon (ICP)

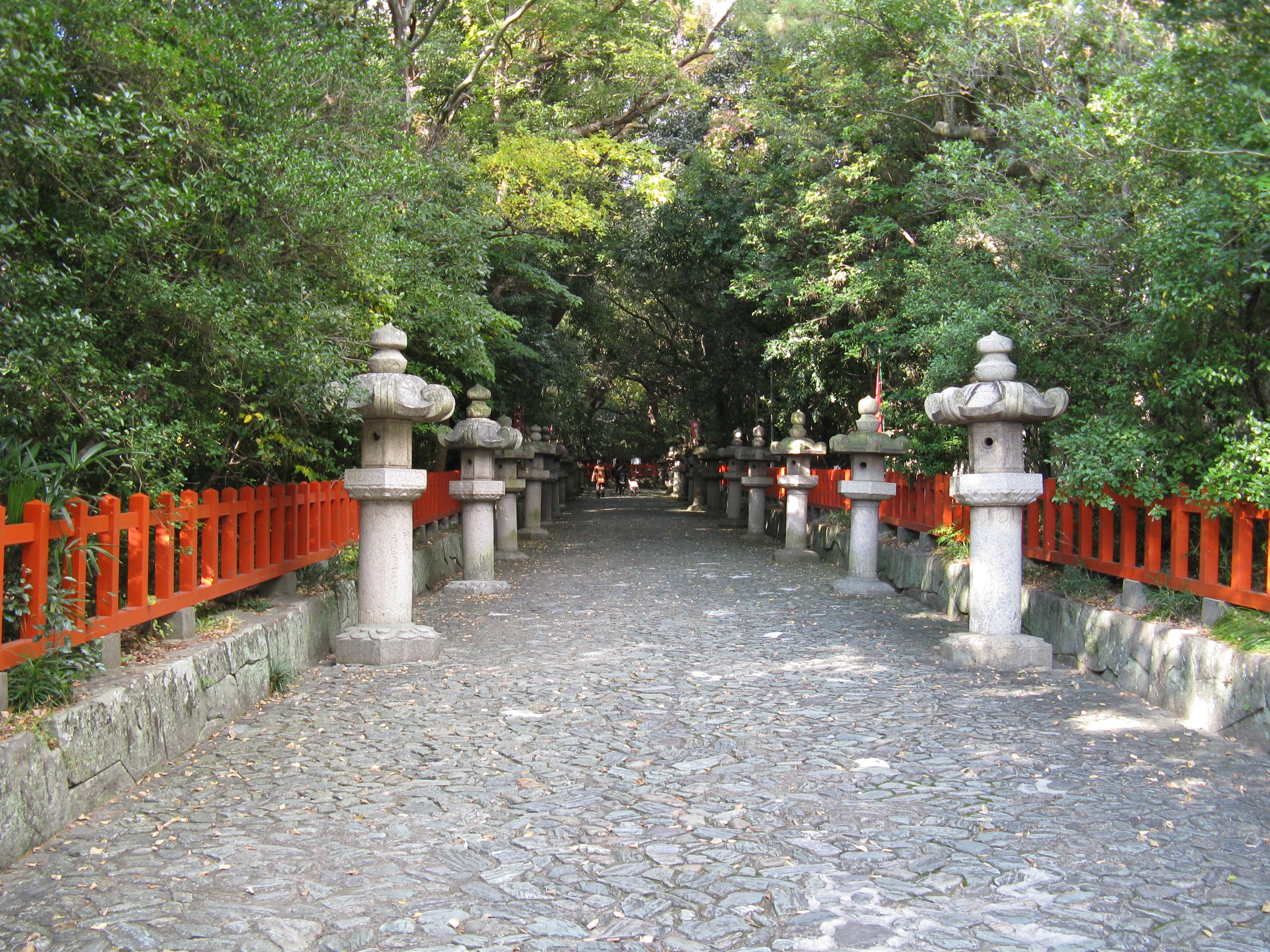
Approach to the shrine

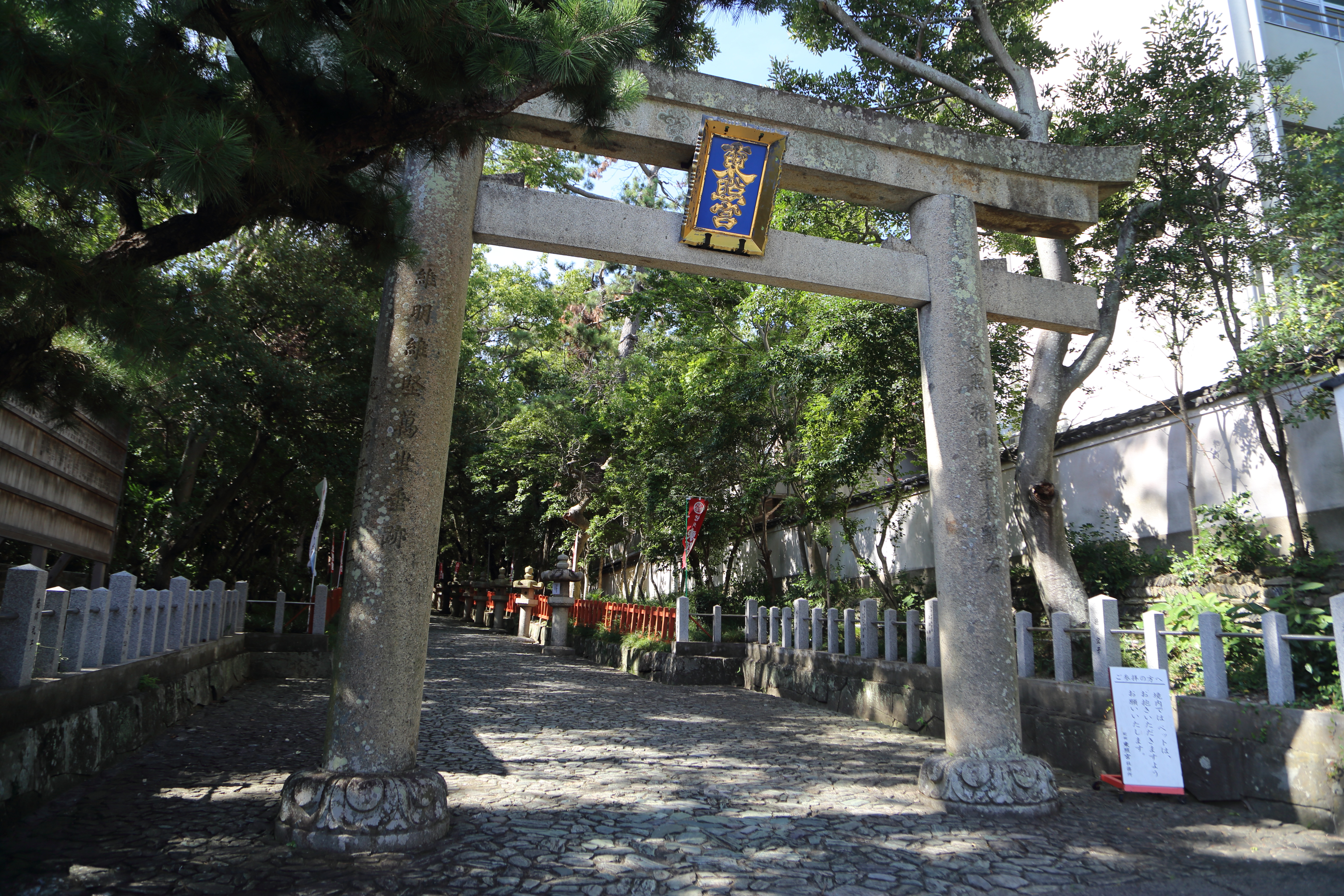
Torii

== See also ==
- Tōshō-gū
- List of Tōshō-gū
