= Ueno Tōshō-gū =

Tōshō-gū Shinto shrine in the Taitō ward of Tokyo, Japan

- 上野東照宮
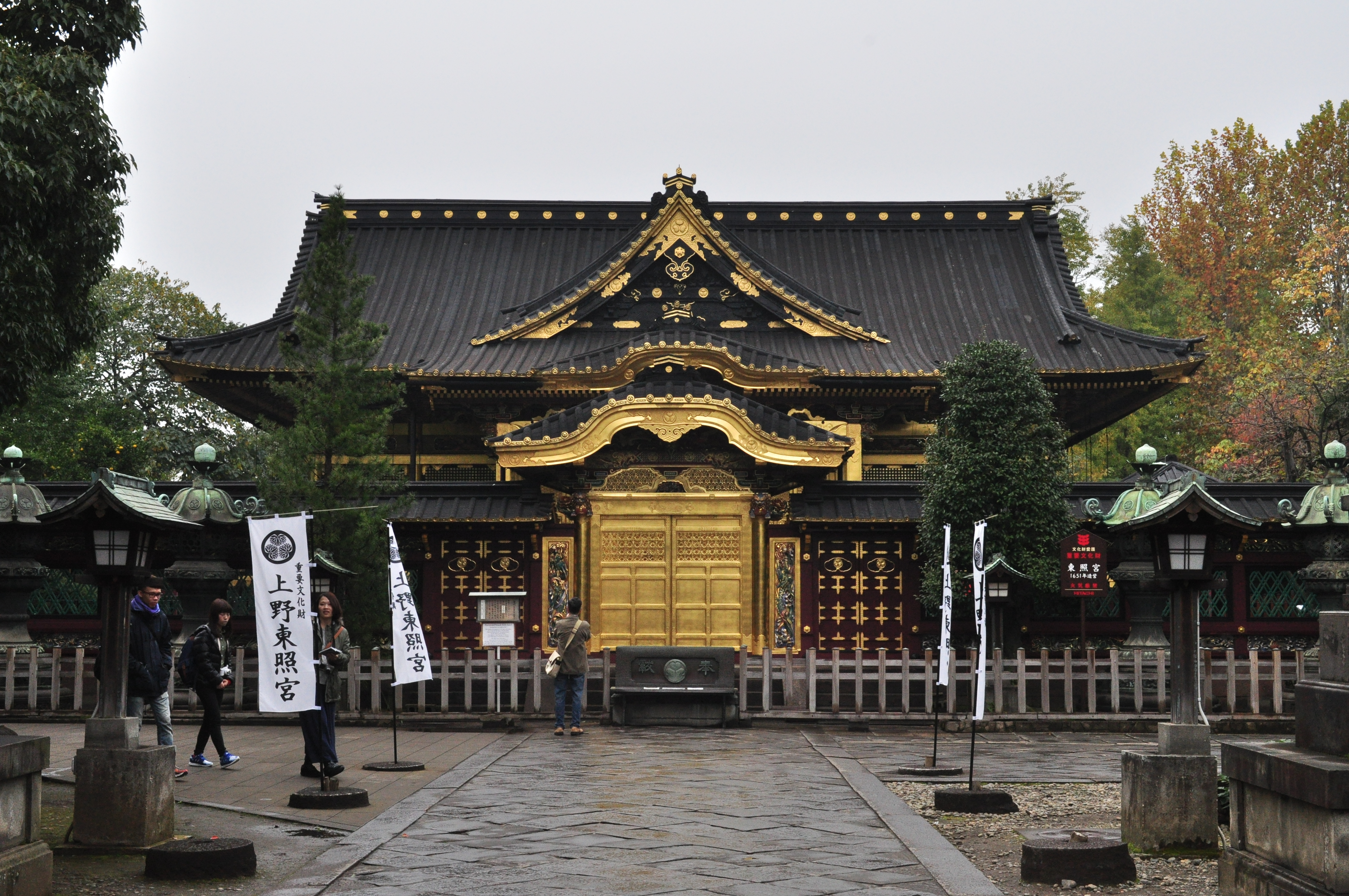
- The honden and Karamon

- Location within Japan

Religion
- Affiliation: Shinto
- Deity: Tokugawa Ieyasu; Tokugawa Yoshimune; Tokugawa Yoshinobu
- Type: Tōshō-gū

Location
- Location: 9-88 Uenokoen, Taitō, Tokyo 〒 110-0007
- Coordinates: 35.7154°N 139.7706°E

Architecture
- Style: Gongen-zukuri
- Established: 1627

Website
- www.uenotoshogu.com/en/

Ueno Tōshō-gū (上野東照宮) is a Tōshō-gū Shinto shrine located in the Taitō ward of Tokyo, Japan.

First established in 1627 by Tōdō Takatora and renovated in 1651 by Tokugawa Iemitsu, the shrine has remained mostly intact since that time, making it an example of Shinto architecture in the Edo period. Several of those surviving structures have been designated Important Cultural Properties.

Tōshō-gū shrines are characterized by enshrining Tokugawa Ieyasu with the name Tōshō Daigongen (東照大権現). Ueno Tōshō-gū also enshrines two other Tokugawa shōguns, Tokugawa Yoshimune and Tokugawa Yoshinobu.

Located inside of Ueno Park, Ueno Tōshō-gū has become a popular attraction.

== History ==
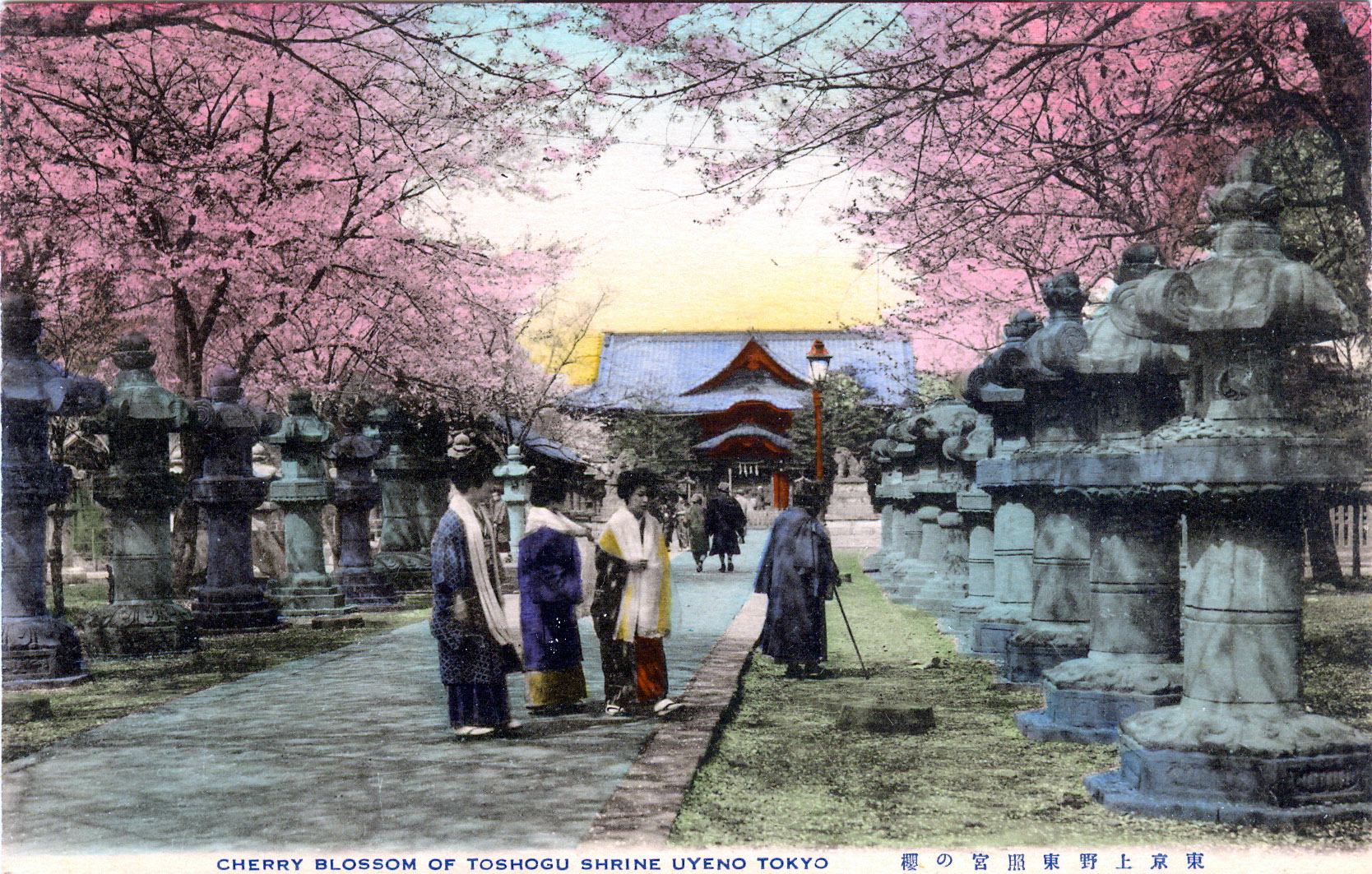
Ueno Tōshō-gū ca. 1920

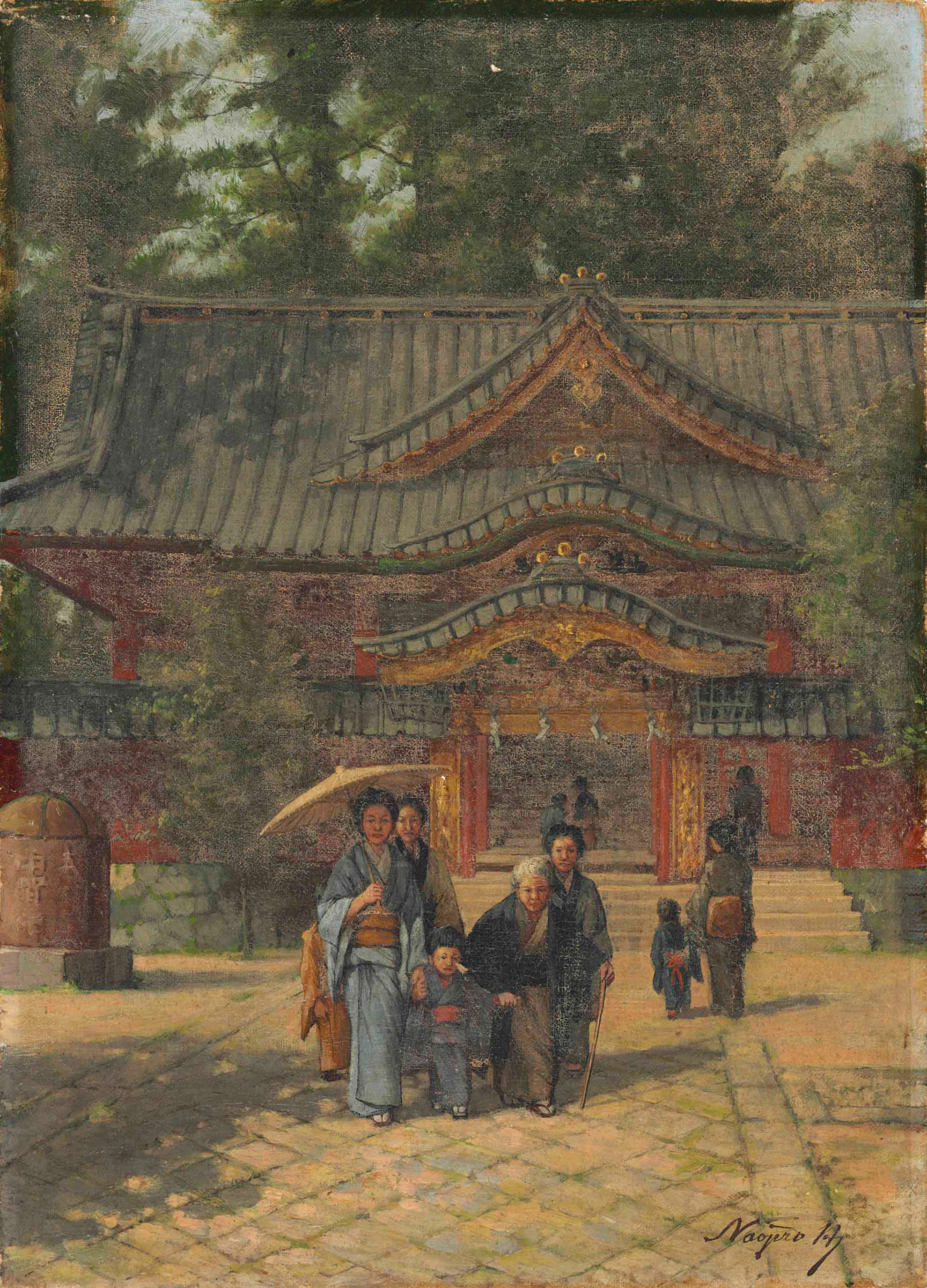
A Visit to Ueno Tōshō-gū Shrine by Harada Naojirō (1863-1899)

Ueno Tōshō-gū is said to have been built in 1627, by Tōdō Takatora. It is known that in 1627 it was dedicated to the memory of Tokugawa Ieyasu (1542–1616), the founder and first shōgun of the Tokugawa shogunate of Japan, which effectively ruled Japan from the Battle of Sekigahara in 1600 until the Meiji Restoration in 1868.

In 1651 the honden of the shrine was rebuilt in the gongen-zukuri style by Tokugawa Iemitsu (1604–1651), grandson of Ieyasu and the third Tokugawa shōgun.

Until 1868, the shrine was part of the Tendai Buddhist temple Kan'ei-ji.

Unlike many of the buildings in the surrounding area, Ueno Tōshō-gū has remained intact throughout the numerous earthquakes, fires and wars, including the Battle of Ueno in 1868 and the Great Kantō earthquake in 1923.

Tokugawa Yoshimune (1684–1751) and Tokugawa Yoshinobu (1837–1913) are also enshrined in Ueno Tōshō-gū.

== Architecture ==
=== Karamon ===
A karamon (唐門, chinese gate) is a type of mon in Japanese architecture characterized by the use of karahafu (唐破風), a type of curved gable with a style peculiar to Japan.

The karamon at Ueno Tōshō-gū was built in 1651, and it is designated an Important Cultural Property.

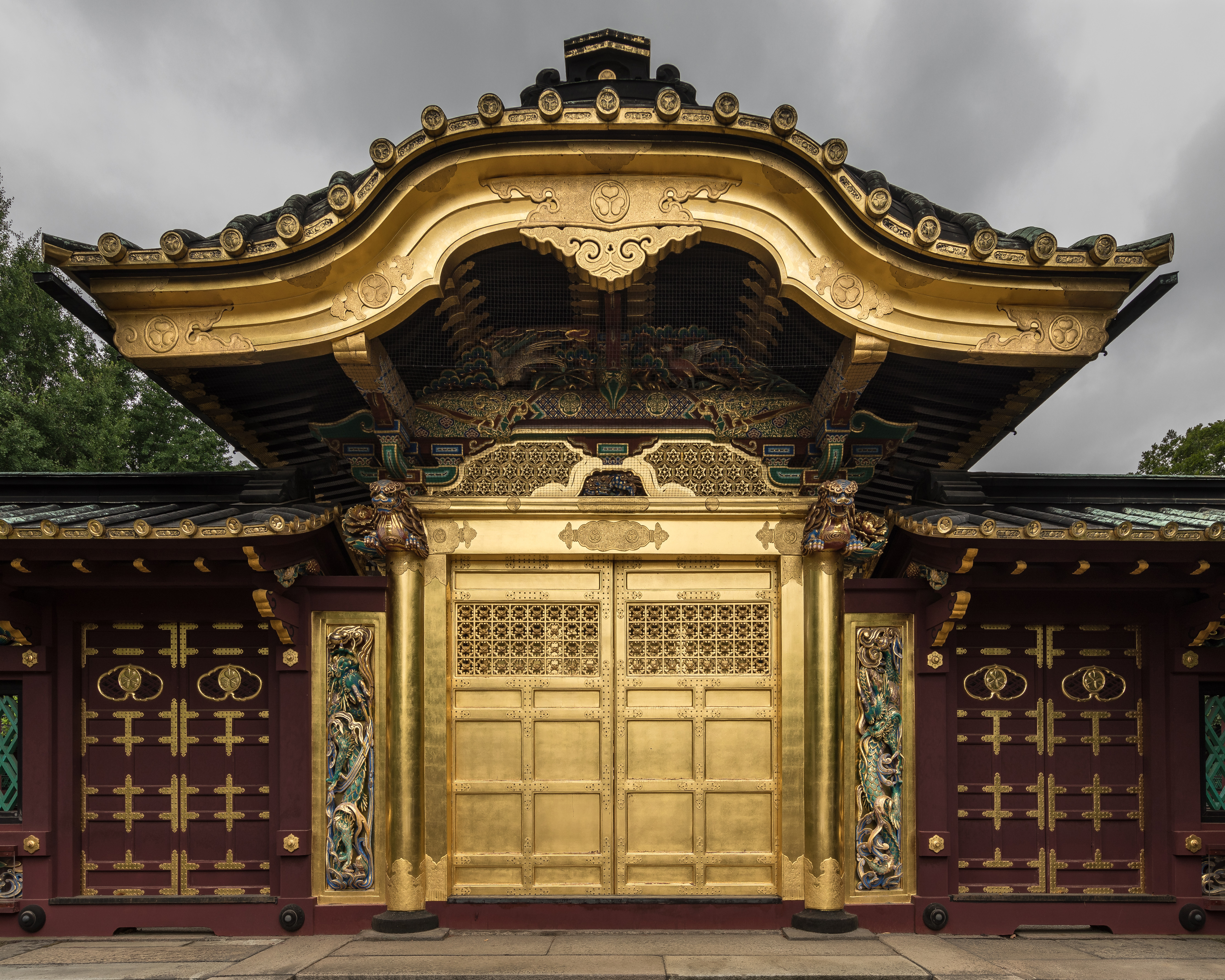
front view of the karamon

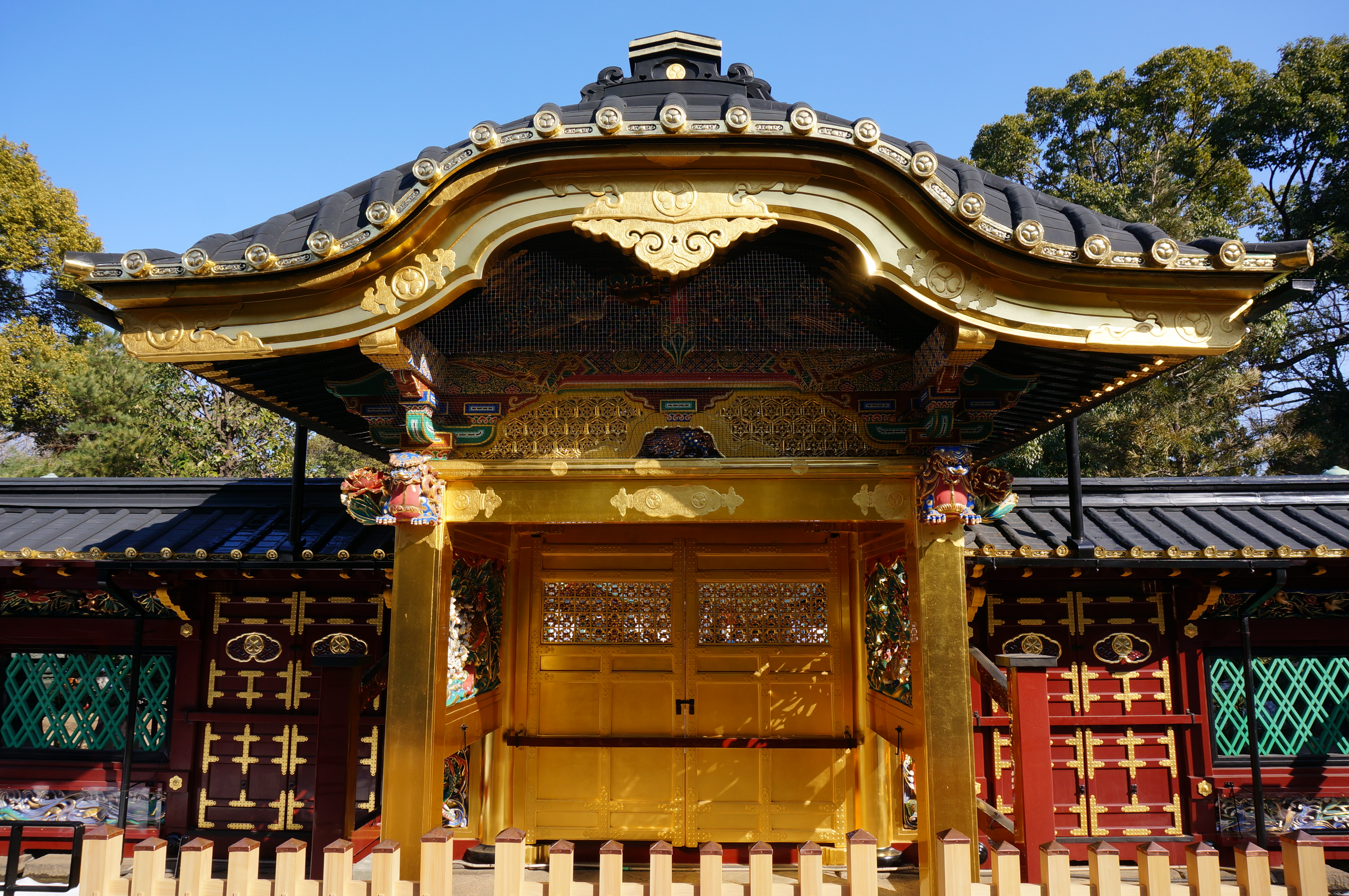
back view of the karamon

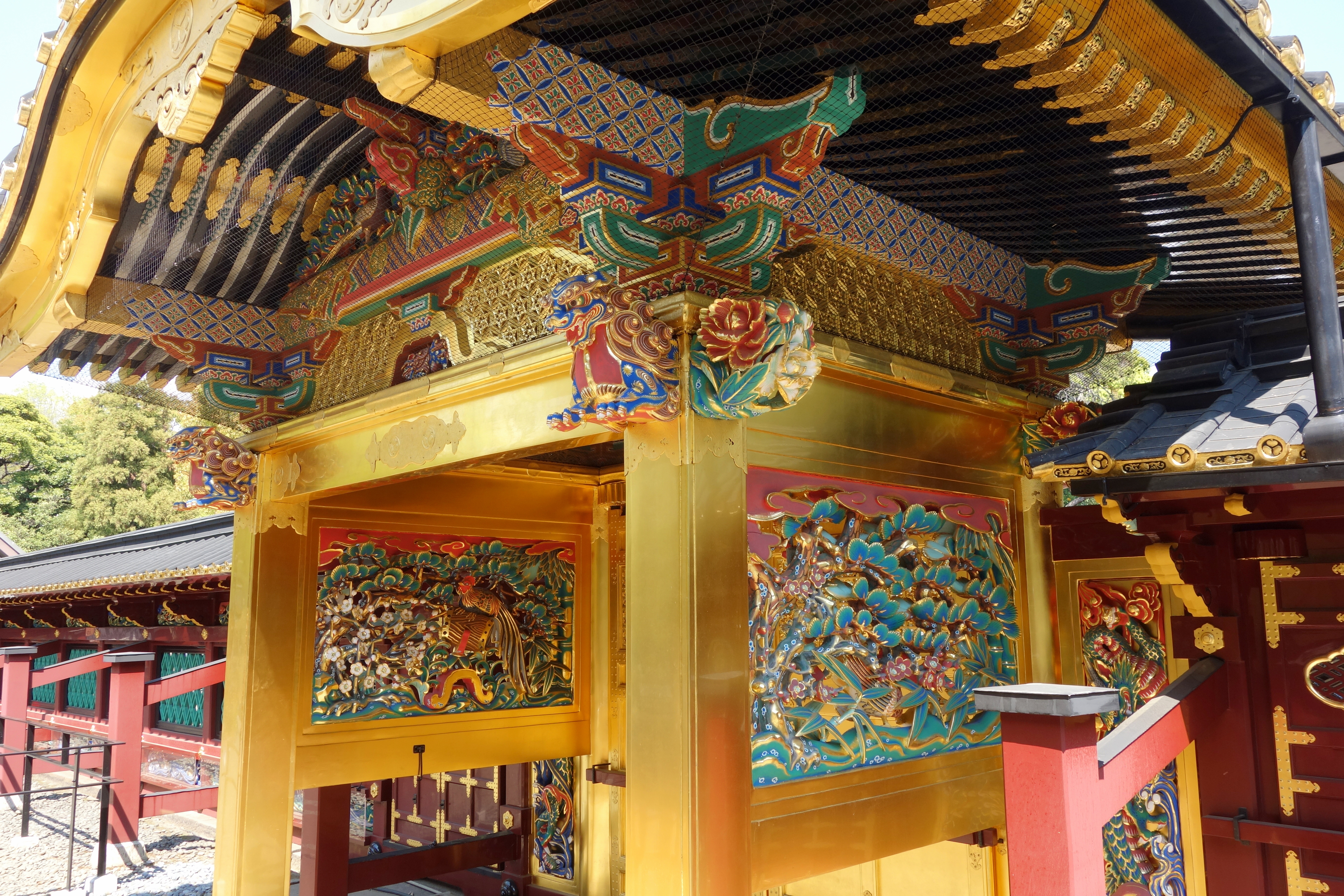
detail of the back of the karamon

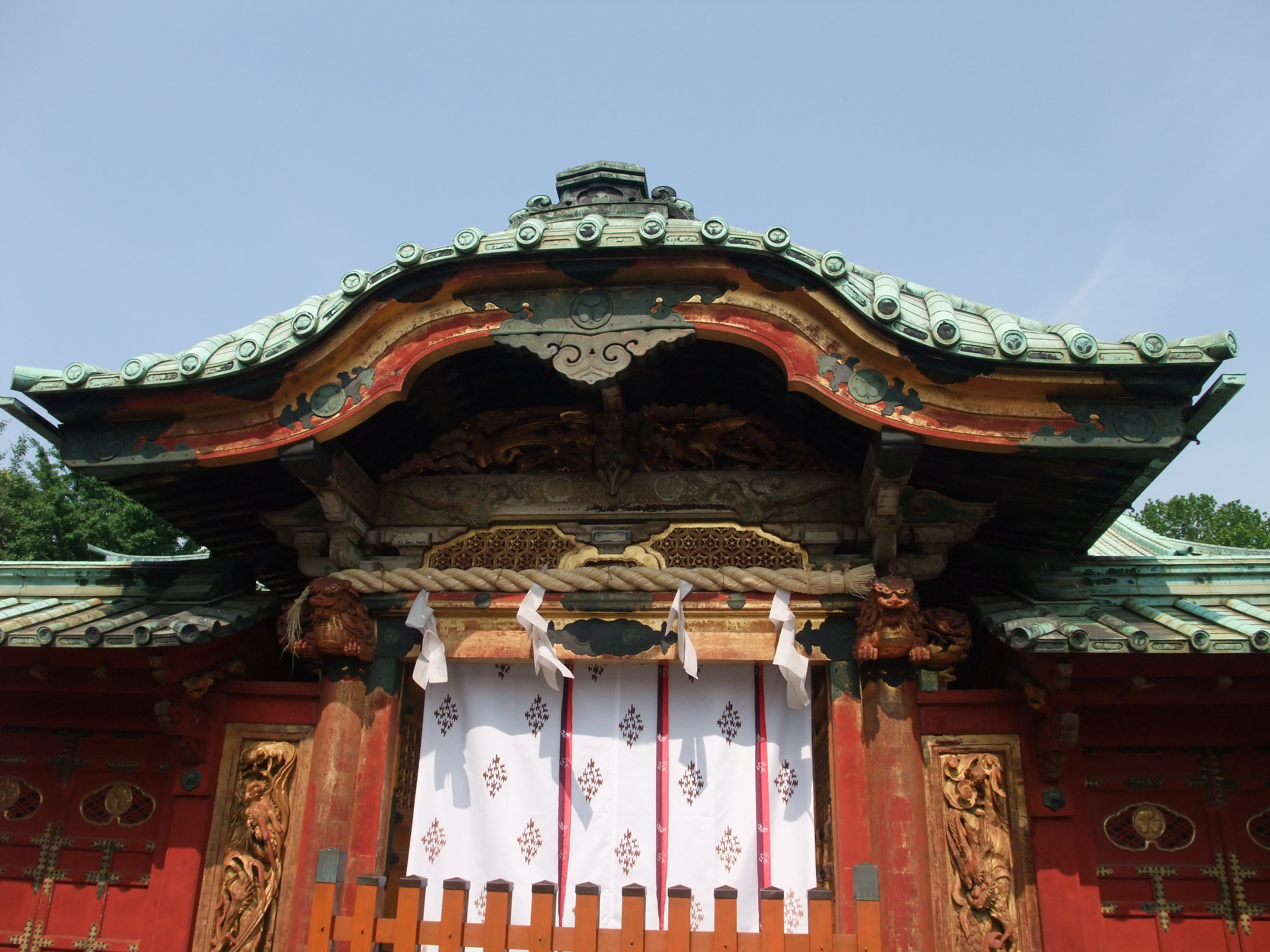
karamon in 2008, before restoration

The pillars of the gate are decorated with two carved dragons. They are known as Noboriryu (Ascending Dragon) and Kudariryu (Descending Dragon), and according to the legend, every night the two dragons go to the nearby Shinobazu Pond to drink from its water. There carvings are attributed to the perhaps fictional artist Hidari Jingorō (左 甚五郎). Jingorō is also credited with some of the decoration at the famous Nikkō Tōshō-gū in Nikkō, Tochigi Prefecture.

In addition to the gold foil, there are several hand carved decorations, including flowers, birds and dragons on both sides of the gates. It is said that the carvings on the gate and on the sukibei wall depict a total of over two hundred species of plants and animals.

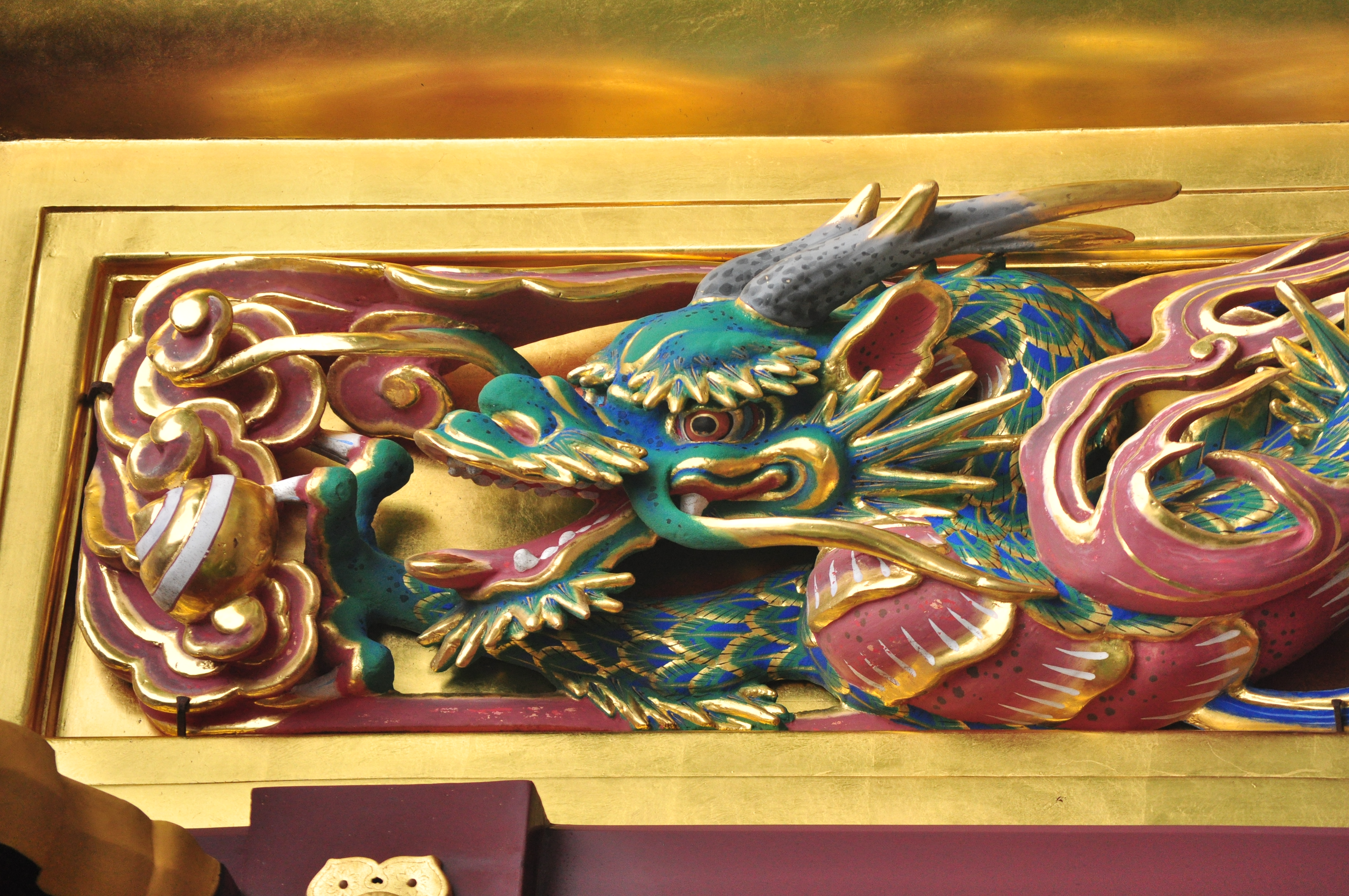
detail of one of the dragon carvings

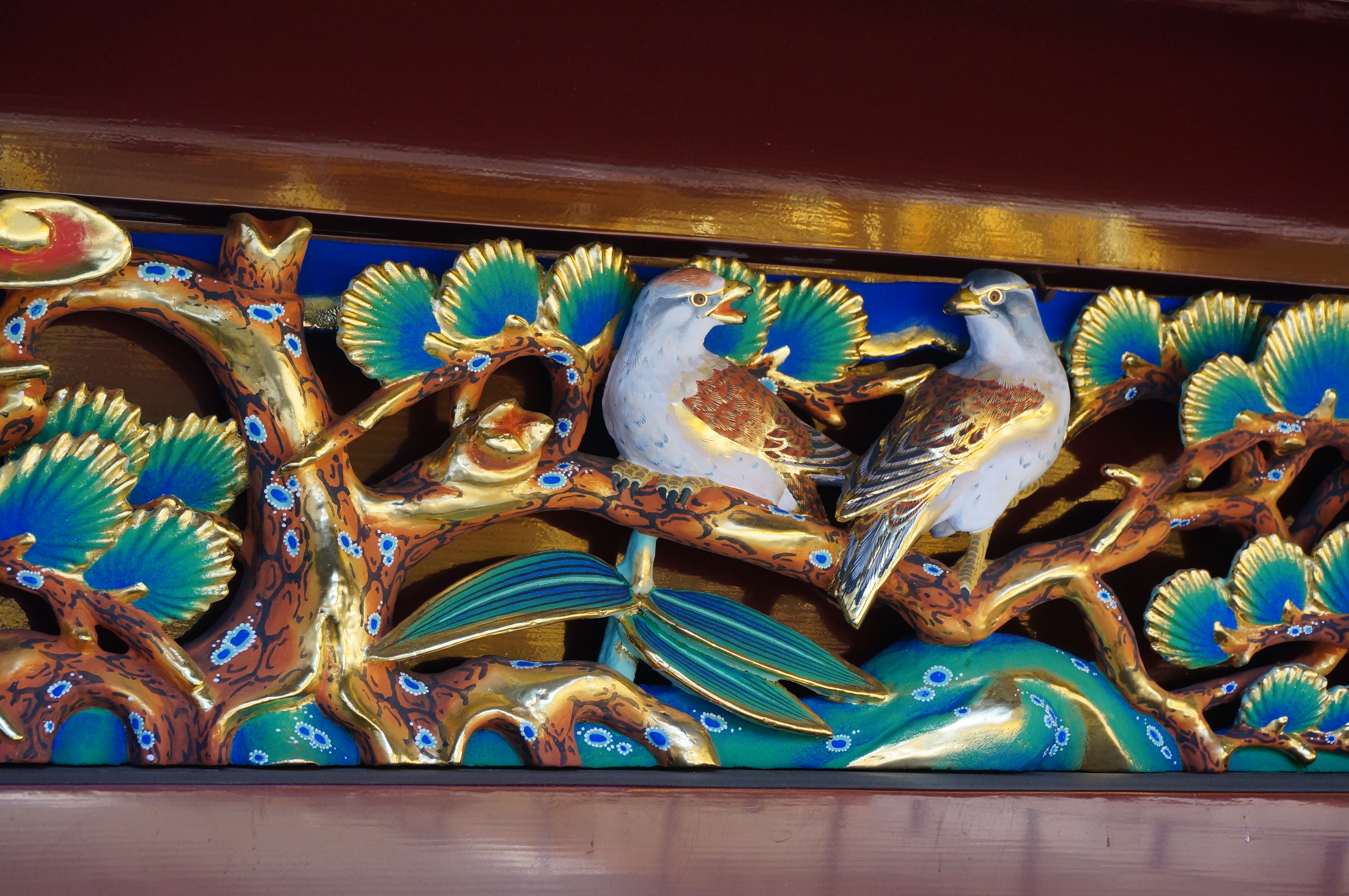
detail of bird carvings

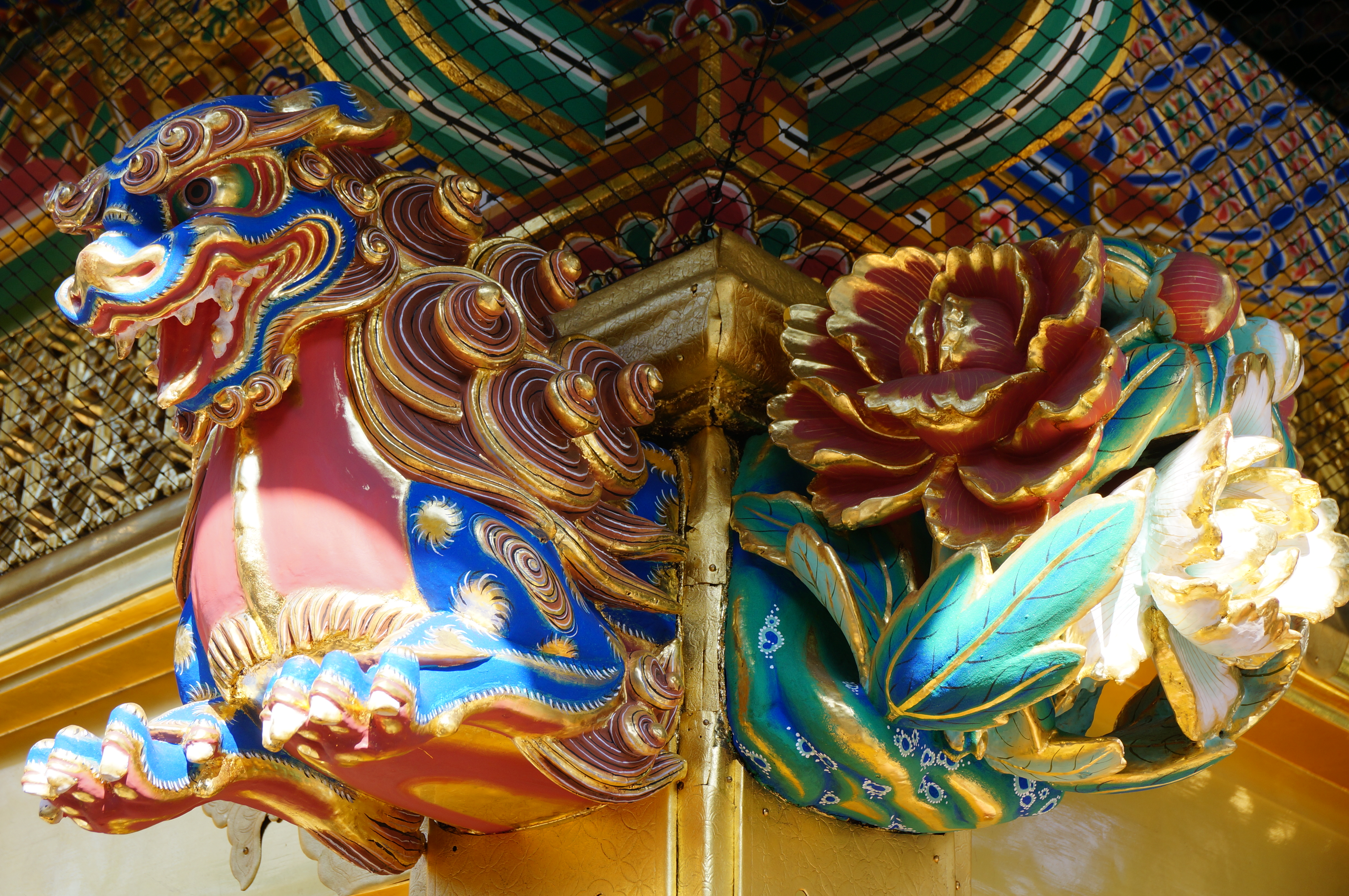
detail of Komainu on one of the back pillars

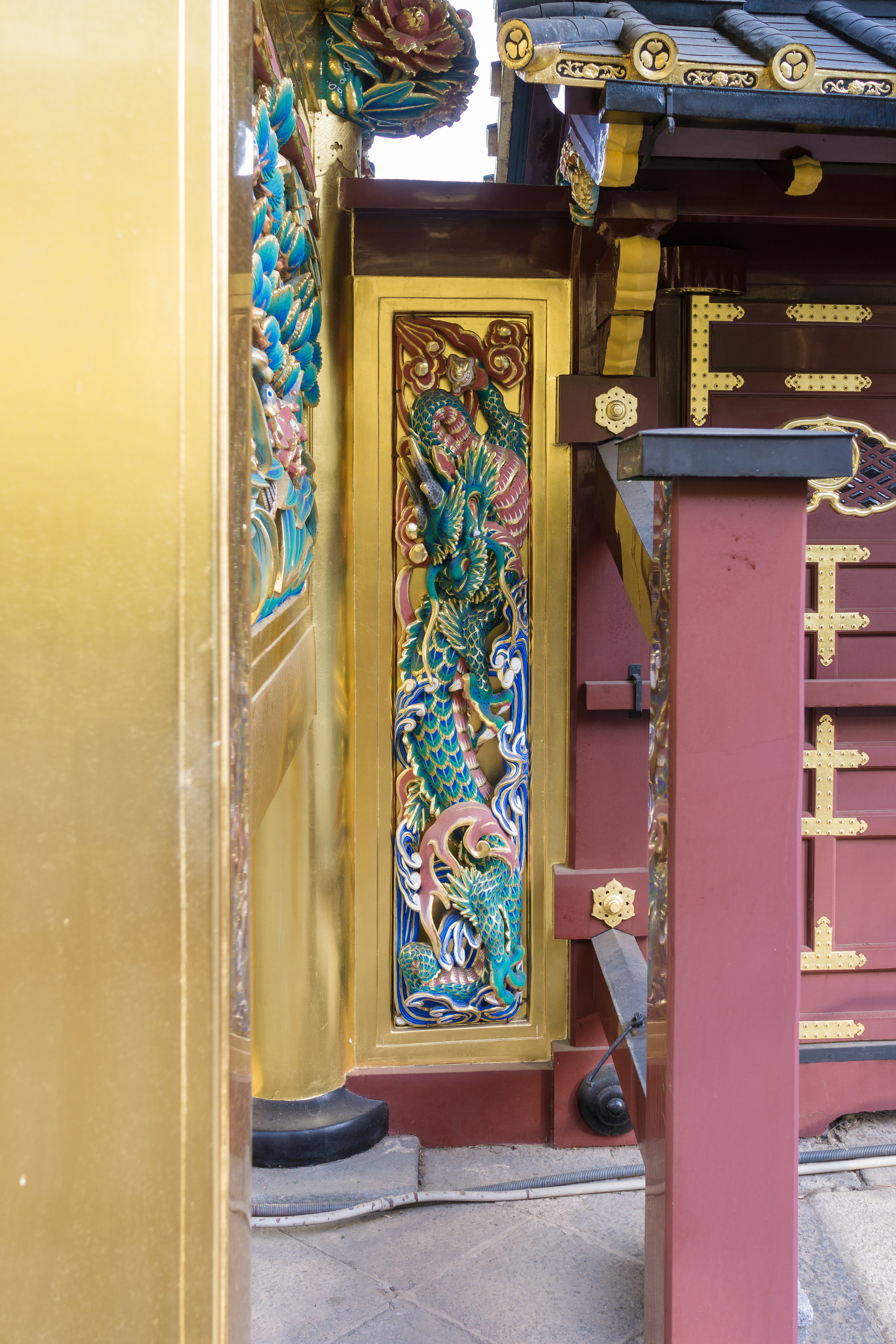
dragon carving on the back

=== Honden ===
The main building of the shrine is a honden (本殿, main hall) in the Gongen-zukuri style, a complex Shinto shrine structure in which the haiden, or worship hall, the heiden, or offertory hall, and the honden, are all interconnected under the same roof.

The whole building dates from 1651, and it is designated an Important Cultural Property.

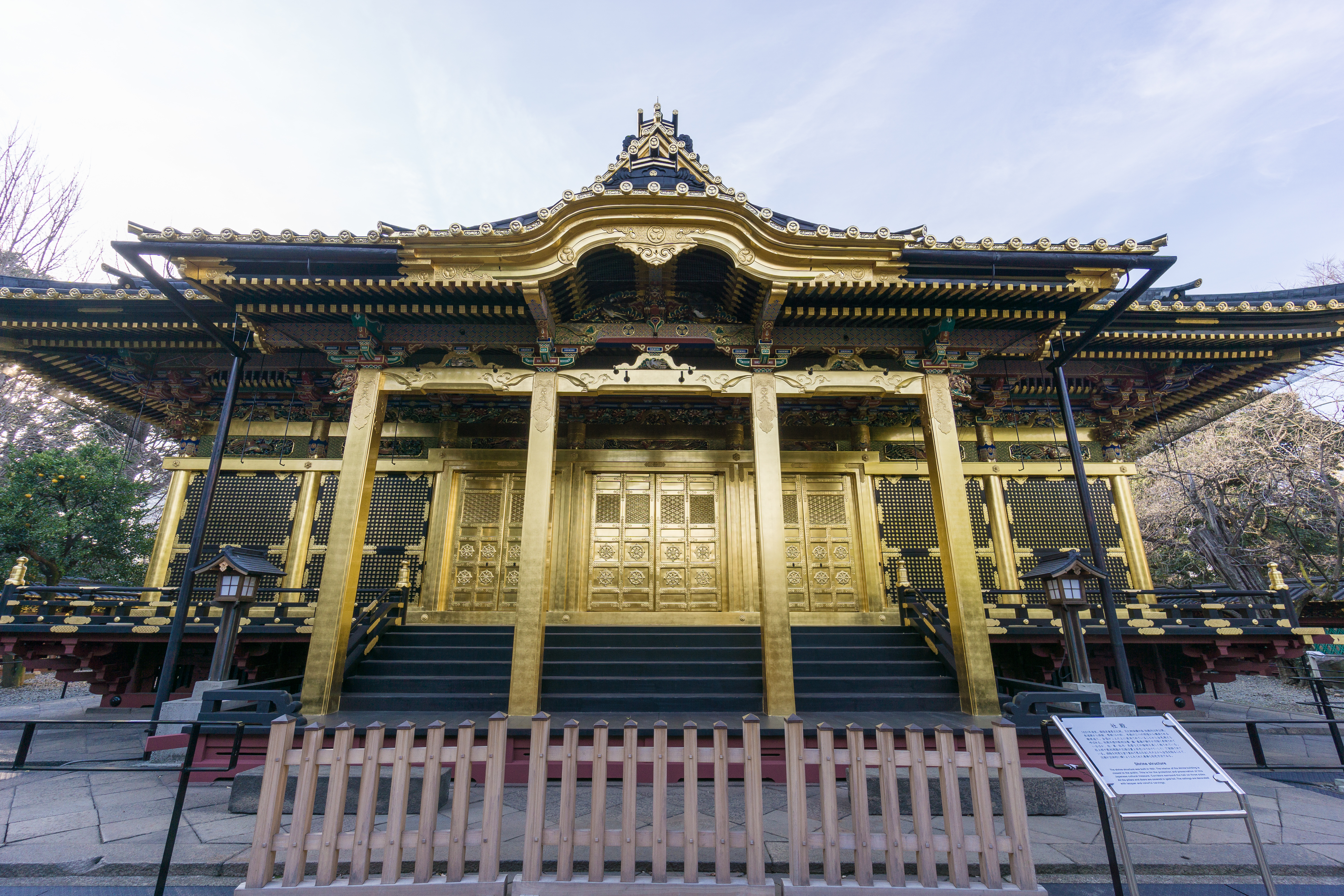
front view of the haiden

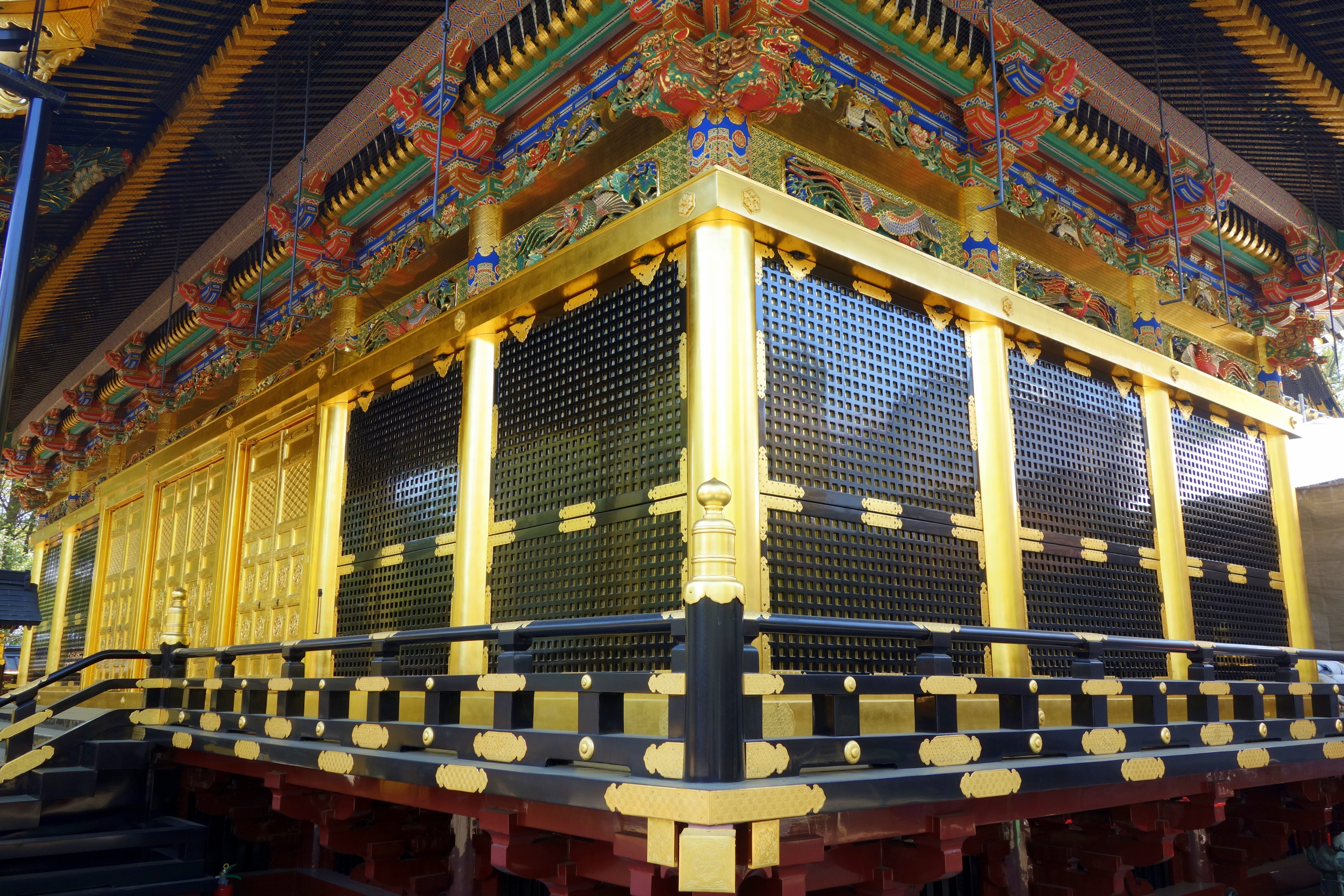
detail of the haiden

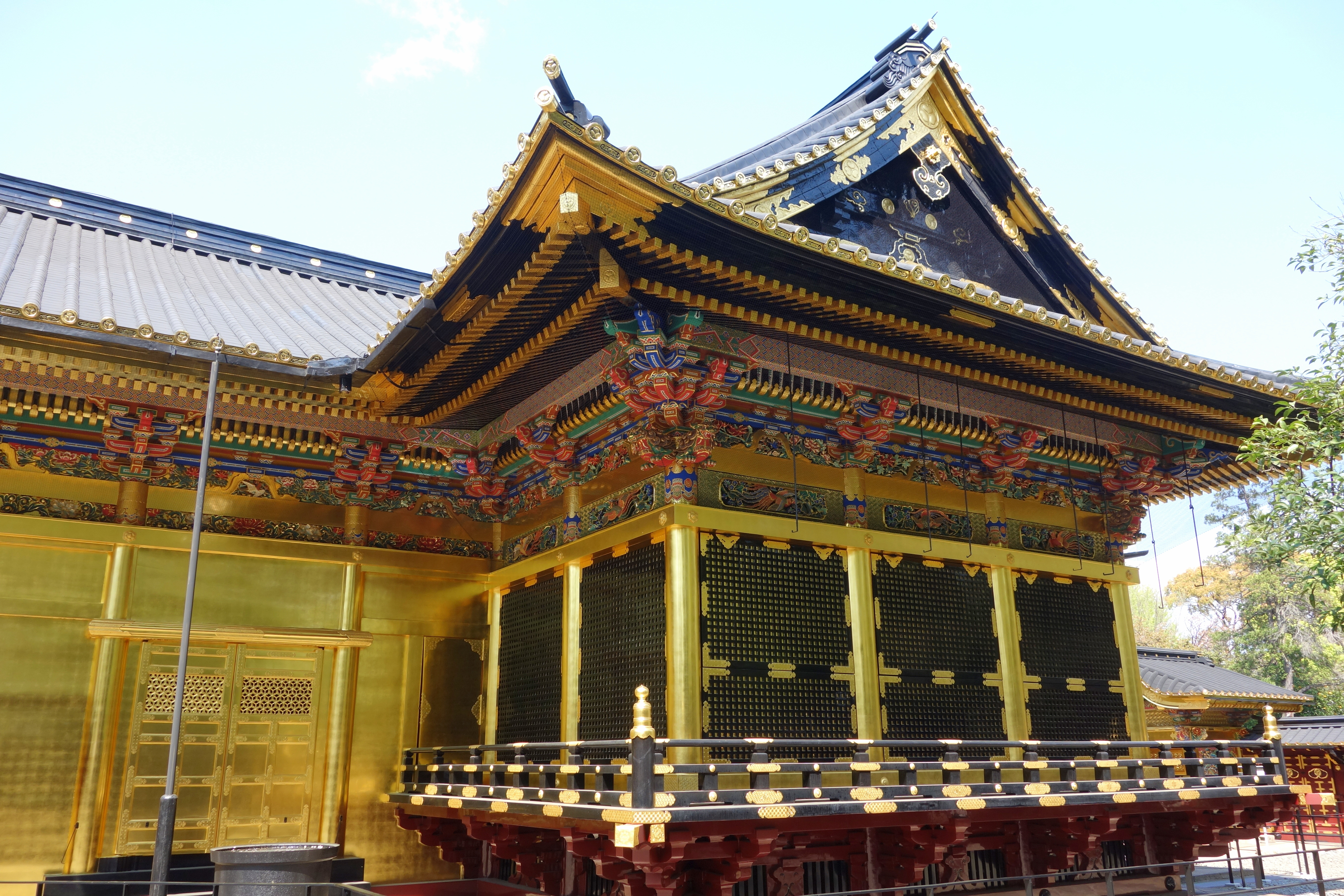
side view of the haiden and heiden

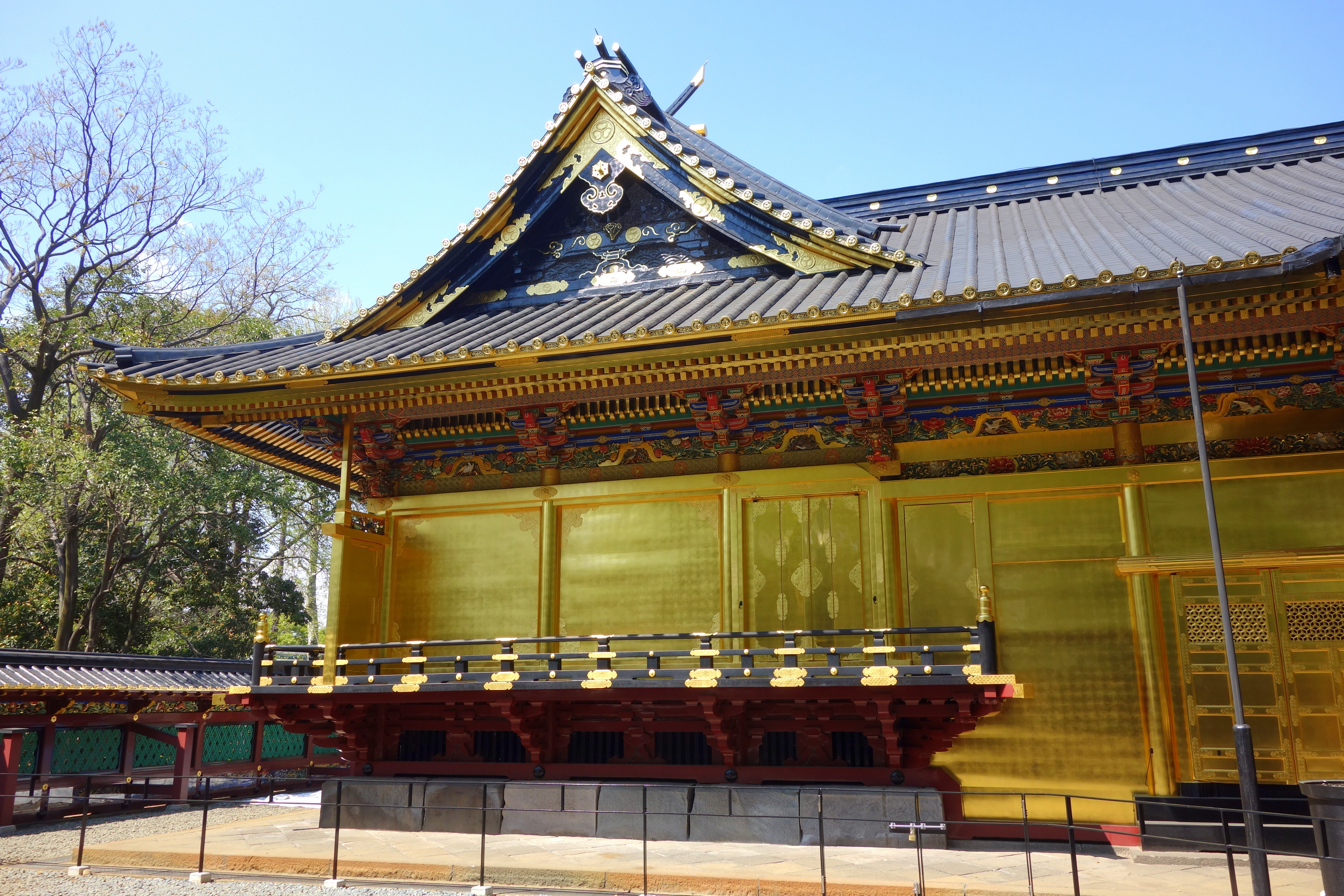
side view of the honden

== Access ==
There is no admission fee for visitors to enter most of the shrine precincts, but there is a fee (as of 2022, 500 yen) in order to go beyond the karamon. This allows you see the back of the karamon and to get closer to the honden, but the hall itself remains closed. There is an extra admission fee (as of 2017, 700 yen) to enter the peony garden.

The shrines opens at 9 am and closes at 4:30 pm (from October to February) or 5:30 pm (from March to September). The peony garden is open from January 1 to mid-February, and from mid-April to mid-May.

Ueno Tōshō-gū can be accessed via the following public transport options:

- Ueno Station
- Keisei Ueno Station
- Nezu Station
