= Testament of Ieyasu =

1605 Japanese political statement

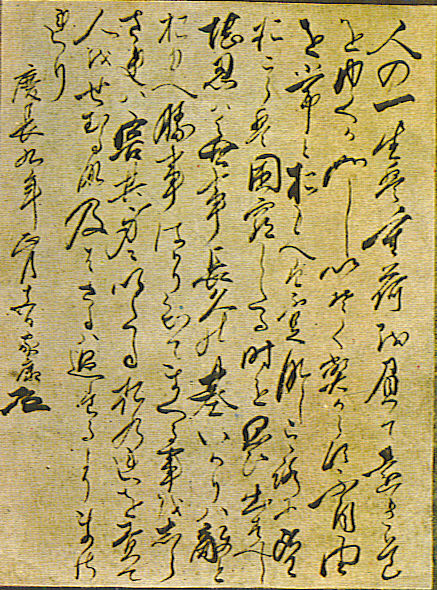
Precepts on the secret of success in life drafted by Tokugawa Ieyasu from the collection of Nikkō Tōshō-gū.

Testament of Ieyasu (東照宮御遺訓, Tōshō-gū goikun), also known as Ieyasu precepts or Legacy of Ieyasu, was a formal statement made by Tokugawa Ieyasu.

== History ==
Ieyasu was the head of the Tokugawa shogunate. His words were spoken and written down at the time of his abdication as shōgun. Witnesses included Honda Masazumi (1565–1637) and two Buddhist priests. The original historical document is in the archives of the Tōshō-gū shrine at Nikkō in Tochigi Prefecture.

This political statement provided guidance to his successors.

The "Testament of Ieyasu" is different from the "100 Articles" or "Legacy of Ieyasu", a much longer document discussing the practicalities of shogunate rule, at least partially drafted by his successors, which has been translated into English in 1874, 1919, & 1937.

=== Translation ===
A translation of Ieyasu's words is:

"Life is like walking along a long road shouldering a heavy load; there is no need to hurry.
One who treats difficulties as the normal state of affairs will never be discontented.
Patience is the source of eternal peace; treat anger as an enemy.
Harm will befall one who knows only success and has never experienced failure.
Blame yourself rather than others.
It is better not to reach than to go too far." –Tokugawa Ieyasu, 1604.

An alternate translation is:

Life is like carrying a heavy burden:
It is best not to rush ahead too hastily.
He who accepts it as natural for life not to go exactly how he wants it to will not feel dissatisfied.
Rather than doing too much, it is best to leave things undone.
When managing others, give full reign to their good points and overlook their weak points. –Tokugawa Ieyasu, 1604.
