= Tōshō-gū =

Shinto shrine dedicated to Tokugawa Ieyasu

Yomeimon at Nikkō Tōshō-gū

A Tōshō-gū (東照宮) is a Shinto shrine in which Tokugawa Ieyasu (1543–1616), the founder of the Tokugawa shogunate, is enshrined. Tōshō-gū are found throughout Japan.

The most well-known Tōshō-gū is the Nikkō Tōshō-gū located in Nikkō, Tochigi Prefecture. It is one of Japan's most popular destinations for tourists and is part of "Shrines and Temples of Nikkō" World Heritage Site.

Ueno Tōshō-gū at Ueno Park in Tokyo is also widely known. The Kunōzan Tōshō-gū is in Shizuoka Prefecture and rivals Nikkō's for decorative splendor. Another one is the Nagoya Tōshō-gū, constructed in 1619. A Tōshō-gū can also be found at Miyanochō, in Sendai.

During the Edo period these shrines reached 500 in number, but after the Meiji Restoration many were abandoned, and others united with shrines in the area. Presently, it is estimated that there are about 130 Tōshō-gū. The National Tōshō-gū Association lists a total of 48 shrines.

Ieyasu was deified with the name Tōshō Daigongen (東照大権現), meaning "Great Gongen, Light of the East" (a gongen is a Buddha who has appeared on Earth in the form of a kami to save sentient beings), and this is what gives Tōshō-gū shrines their name.

== Gallery of Tōshō-gū shrines ==
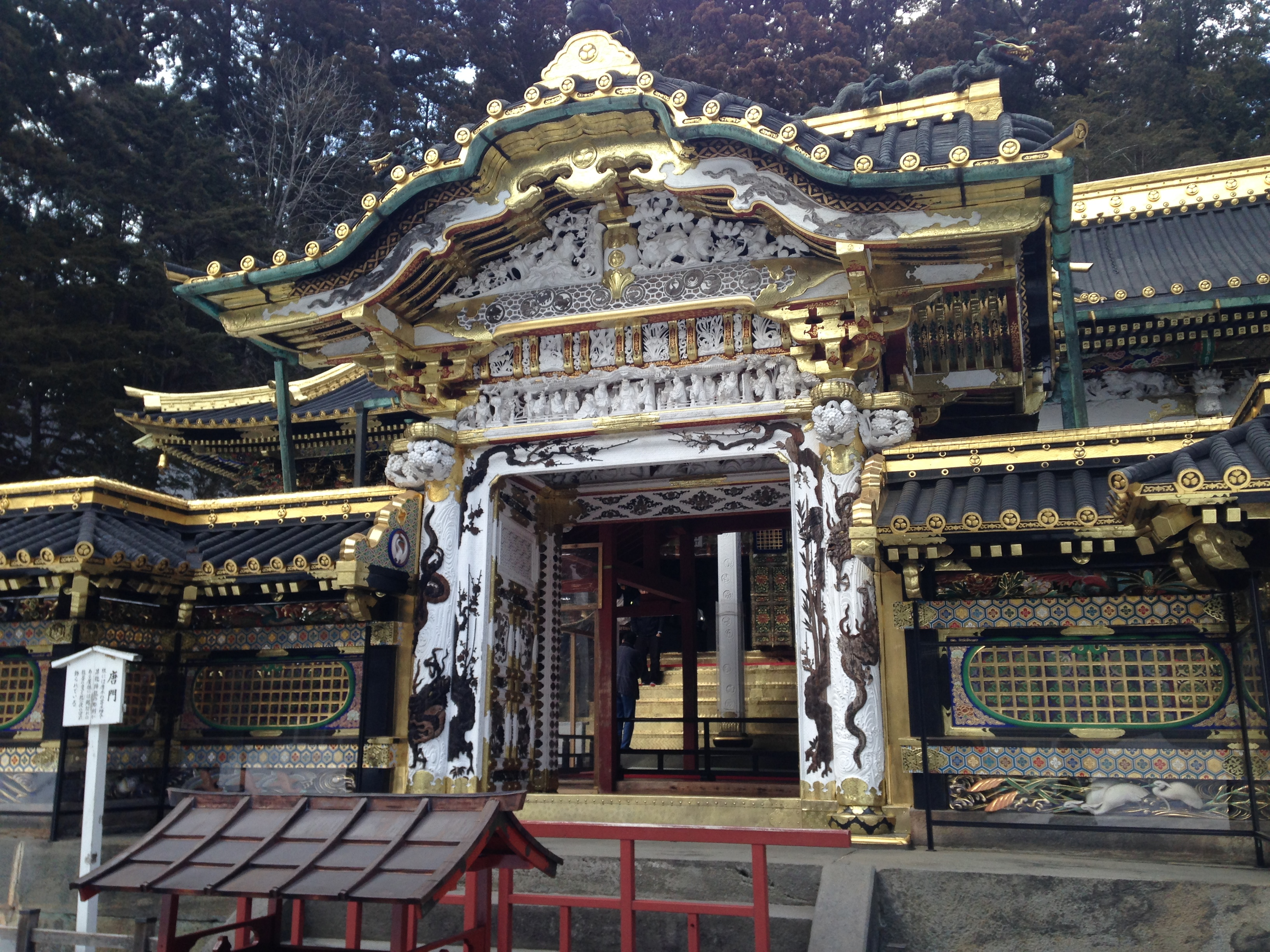
Nikkō Tōshō-gū
Nikkō, Tochigi

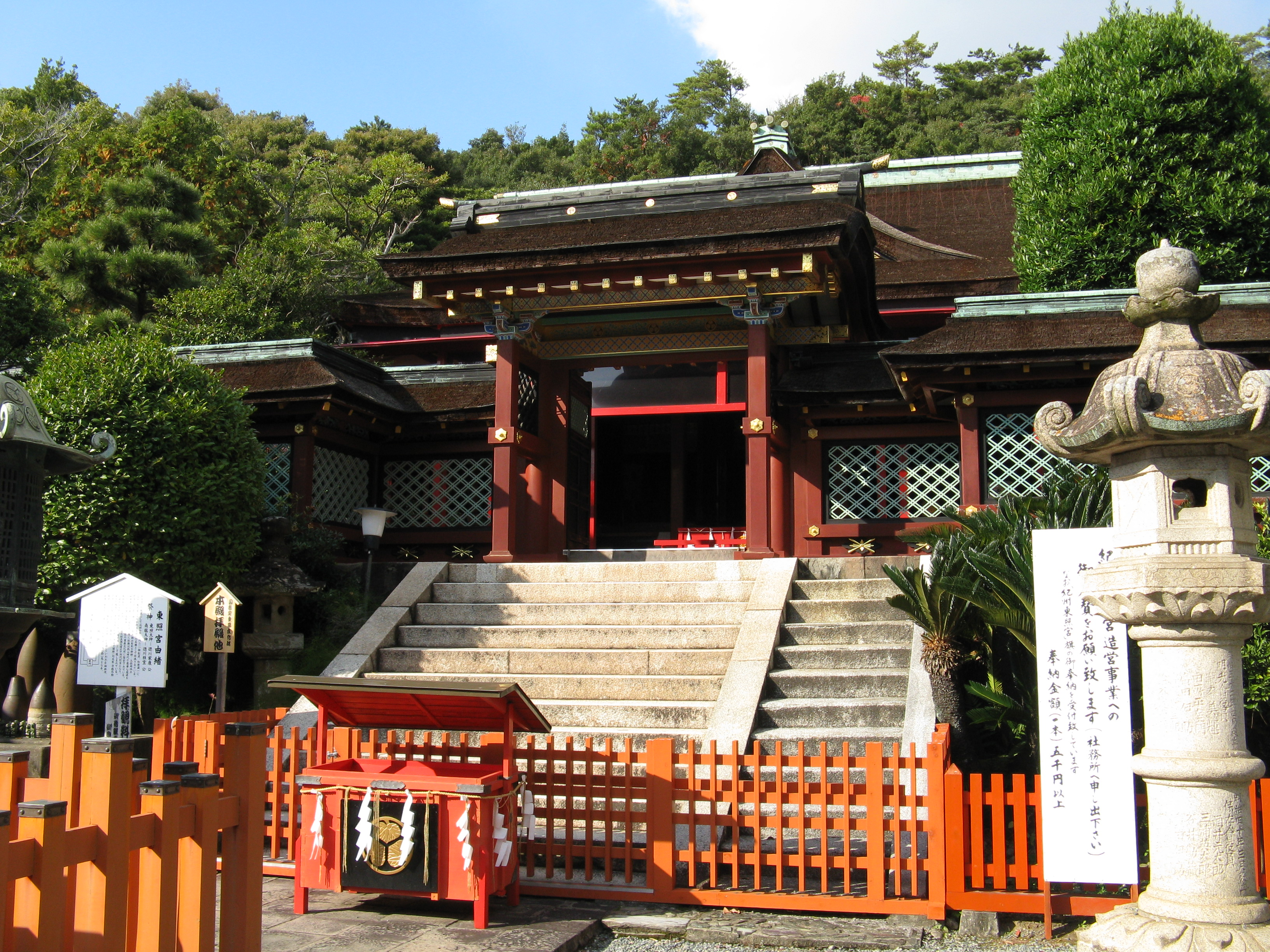
Kishū Tōshō-gū
Wakayama, Wakayama
Built by Ieyasu's 10th son Yorinobu

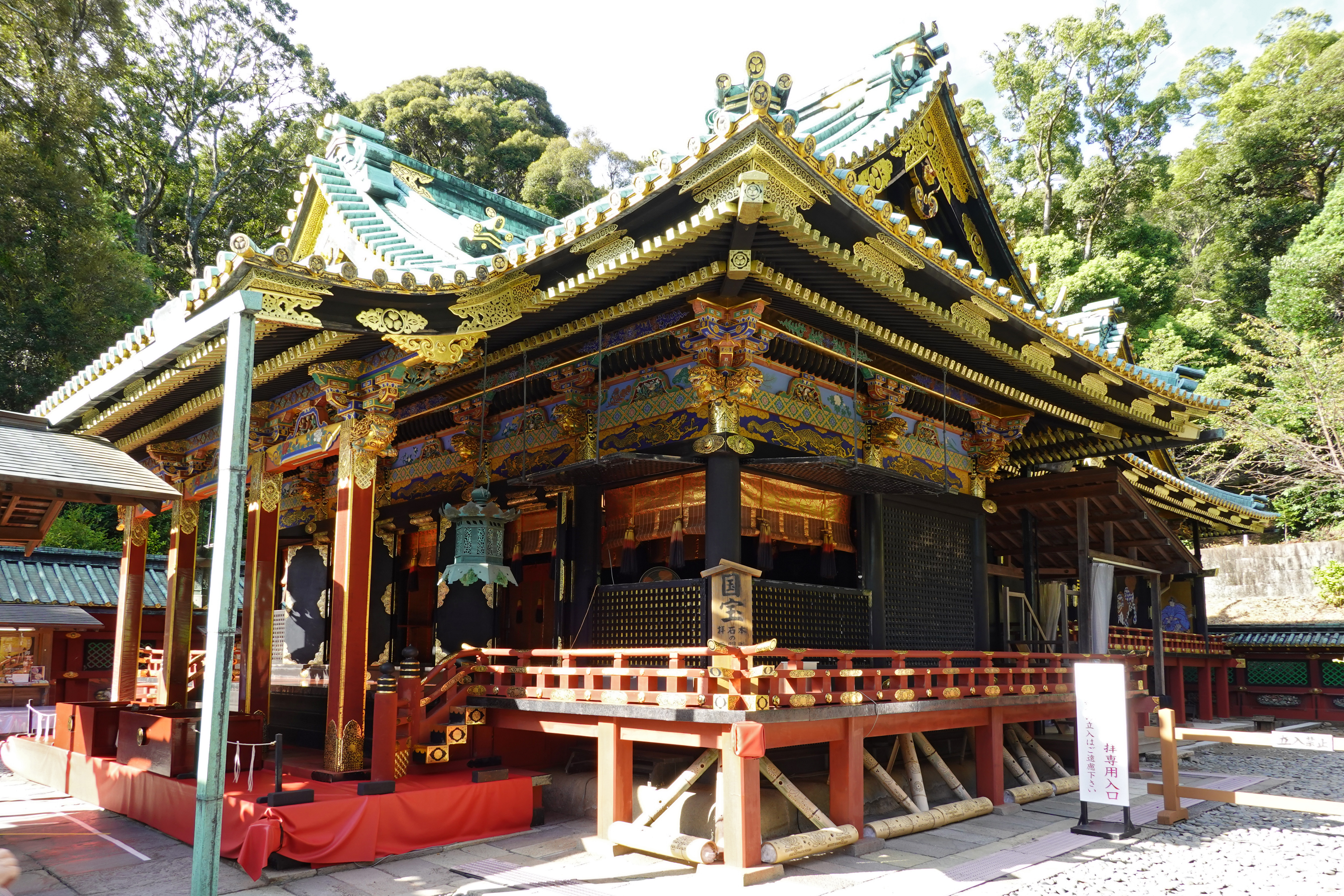
Kunōzan Tōshō-gū
Shizuoka, Shizuoka

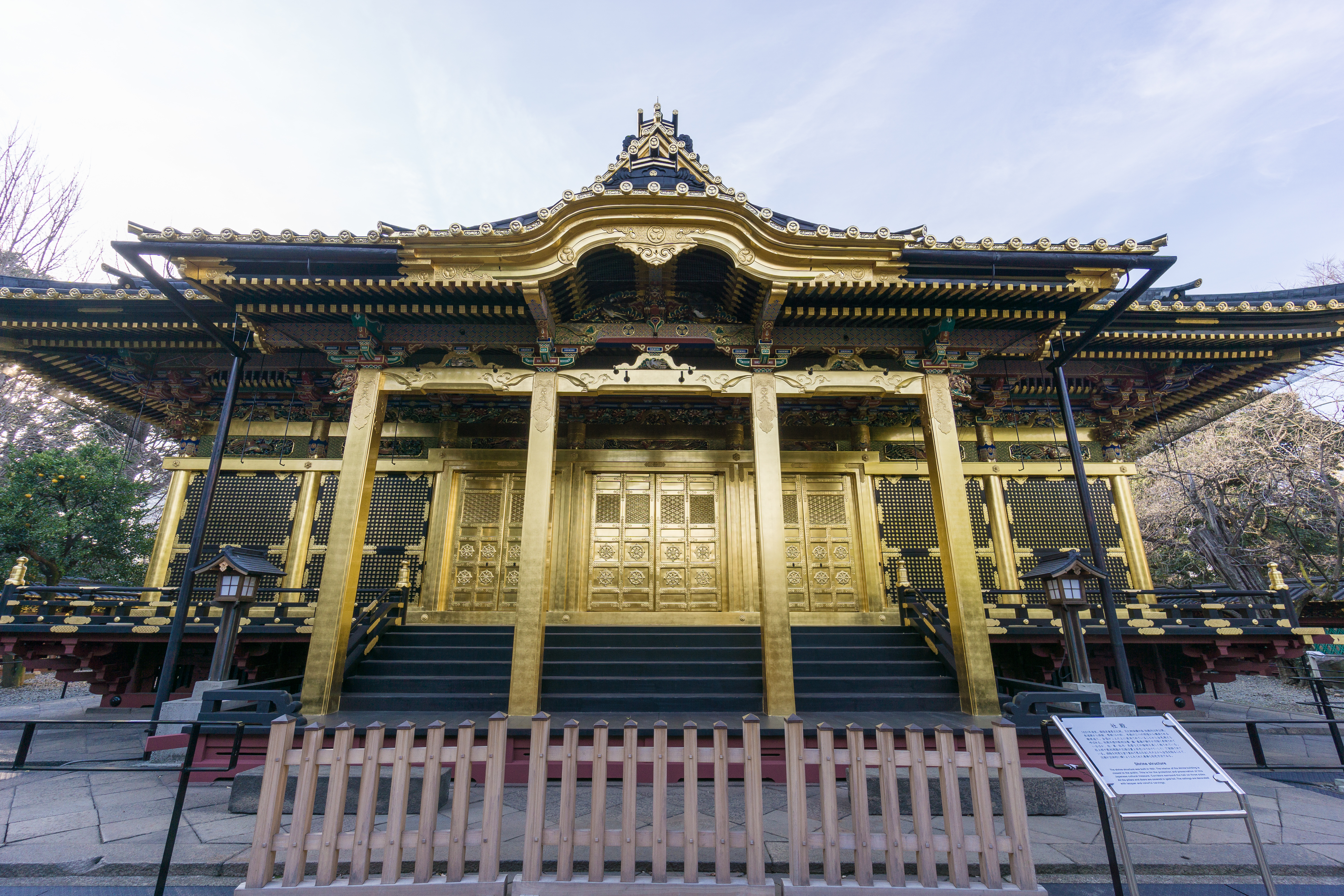
Ueno Tōshō-gū
Tokyo, Tokyo
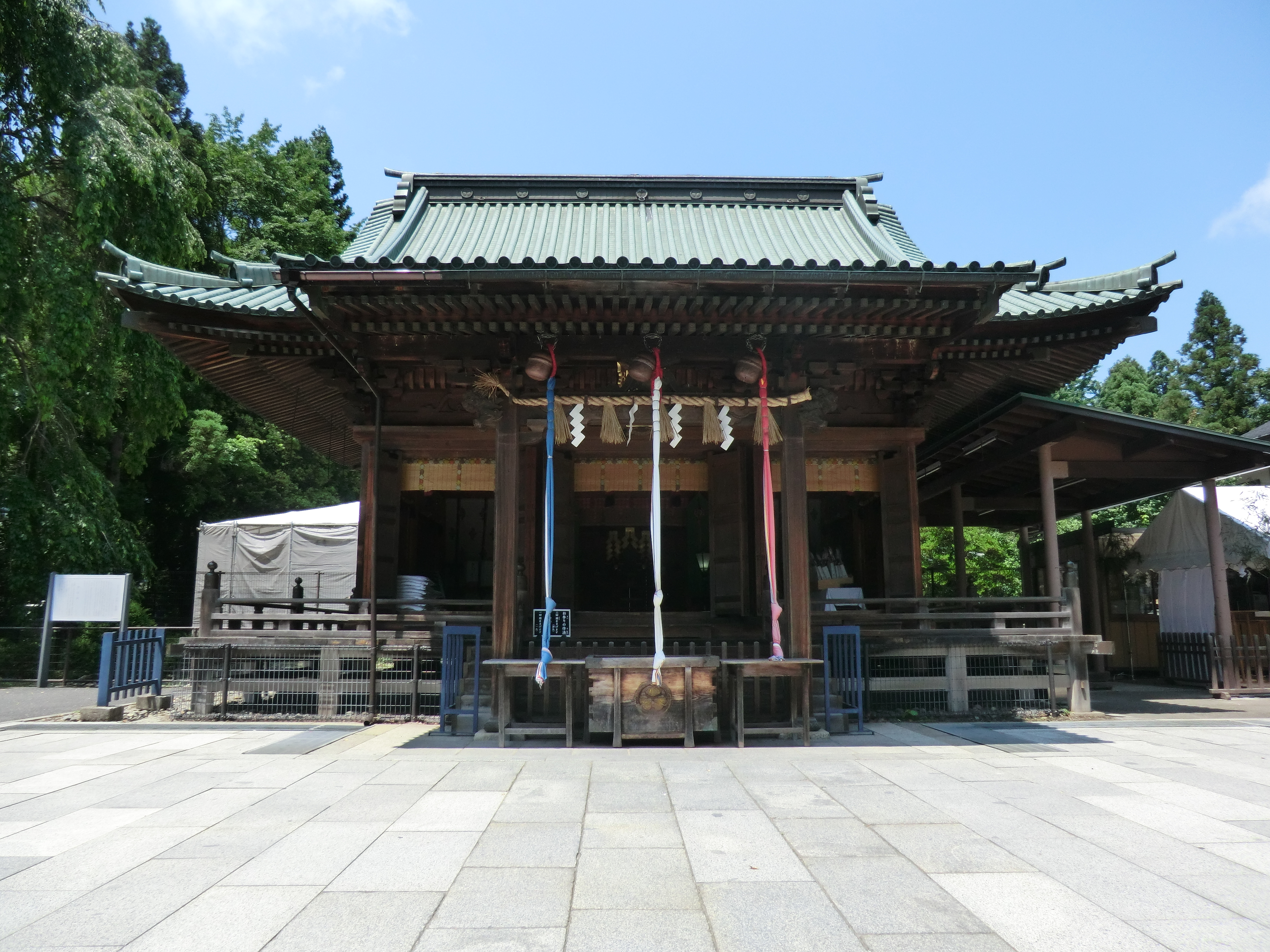
Sendai Tōshō-gū
Sendai, Miyagi

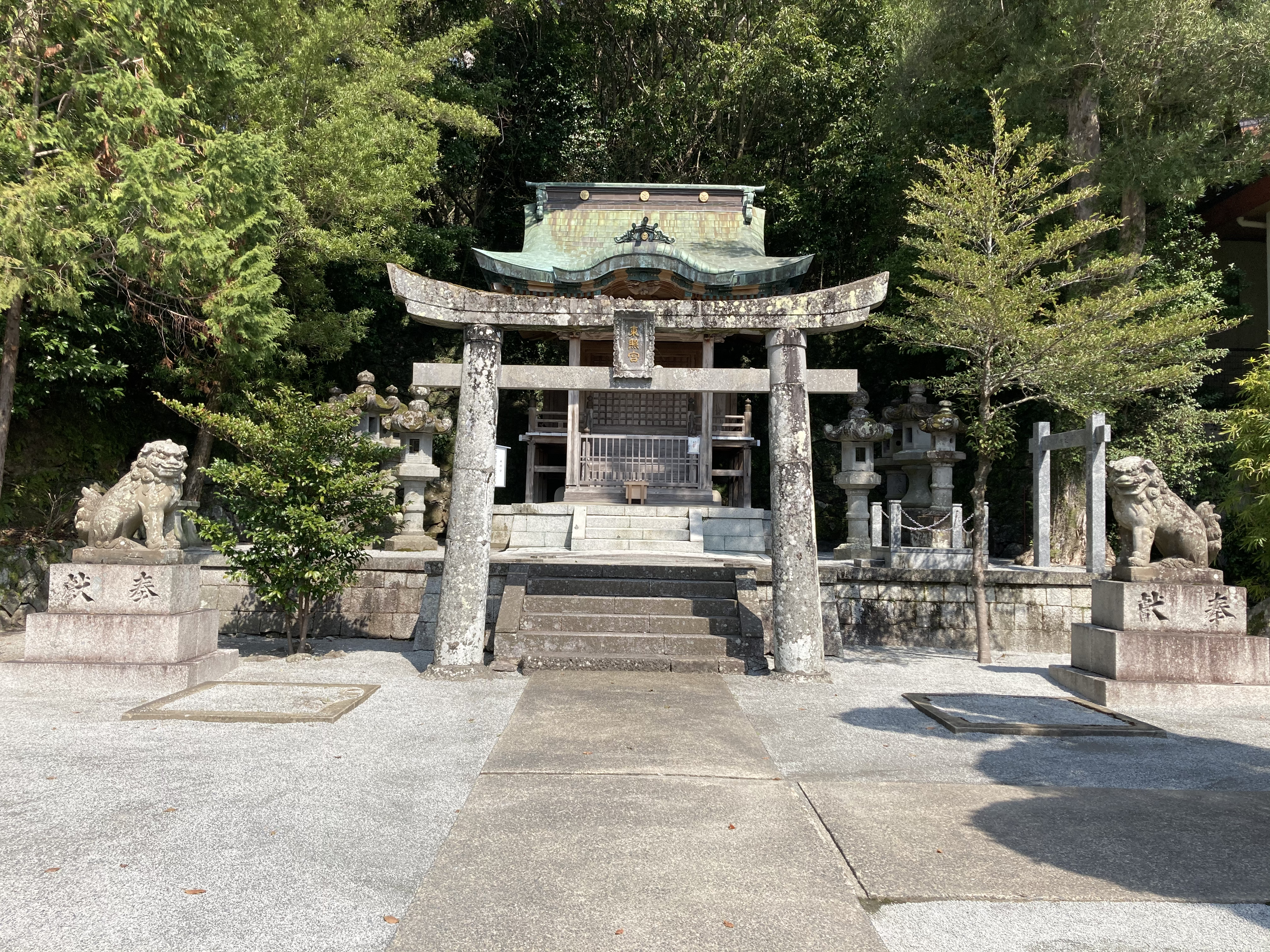
Nagasaki Tōshō-gū
Nagasaki, Nagasaki

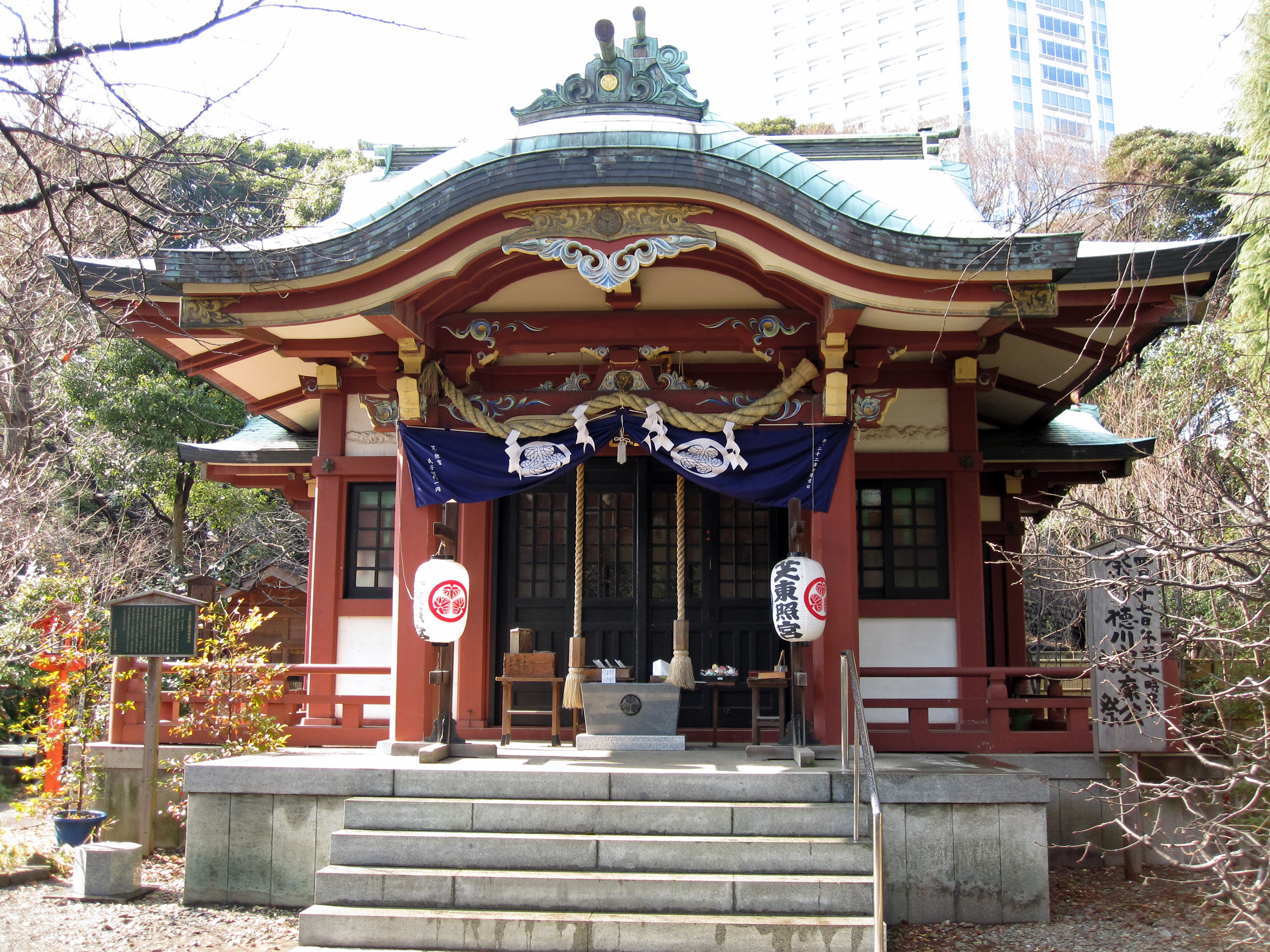
Shiba Tōshō-gū
Tokyo, Tokyo

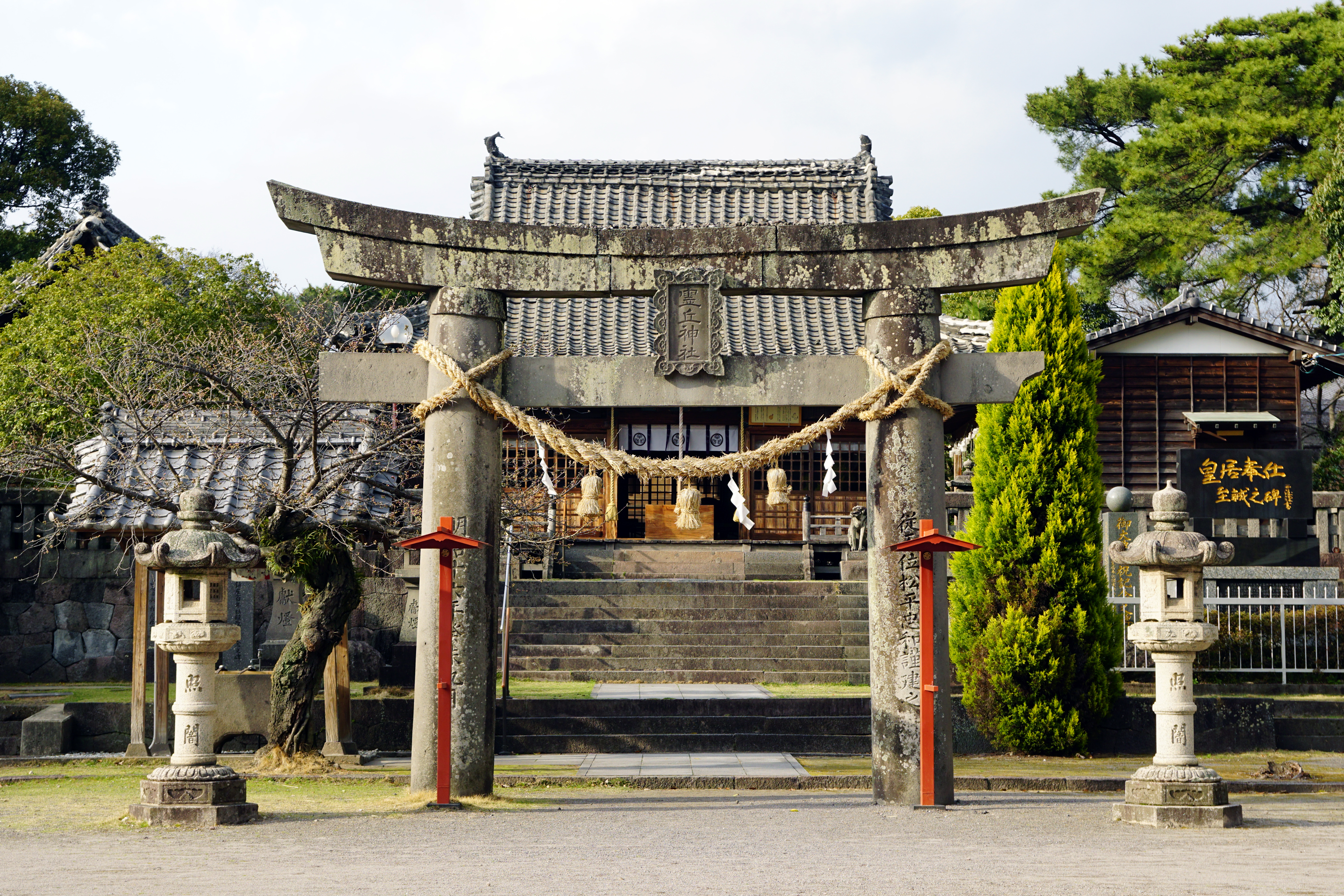
Reikyū Shrine
Shimabara, Nagasaki

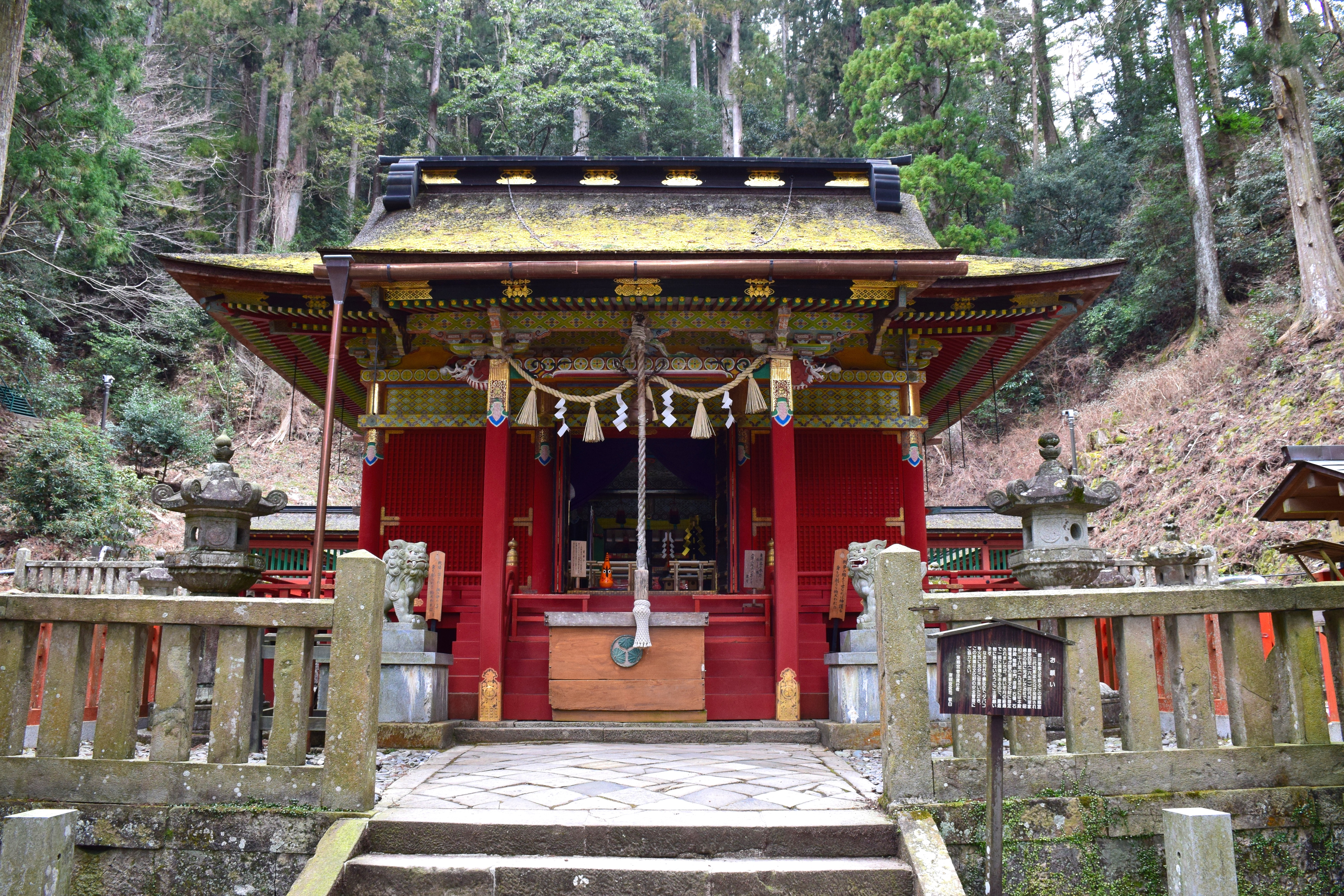
Hōraisan Tōshō-gū
Shinshiro, Aichi

== See also ==
- List of Tōshō-gū
- List of World Heritage Sites in Japan
- Testament of Ieyasu
